= Ariano Irpino =

Comune in Campania, Italy

Ariano Irpino Ariano Ariano di Puglia
- Comune
- Città di Ariano Irpino
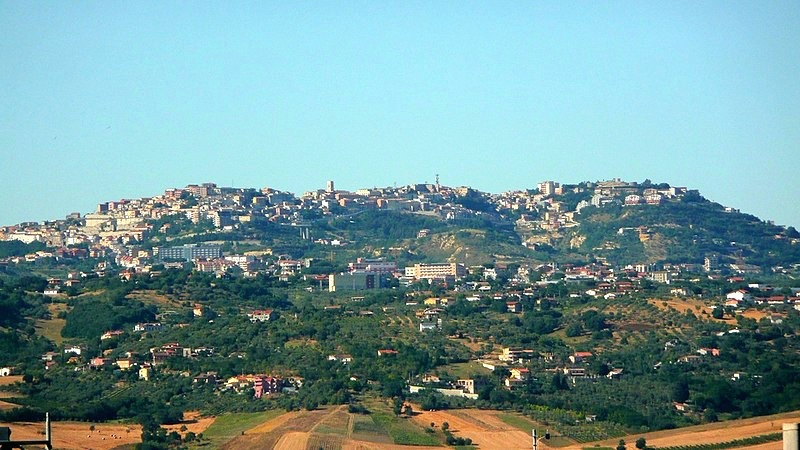
- Panorama of Ariano Irpino

- Coat of arms
- Nickname: City of the Three Knolls
- Ariano Irpino within the Province of Avellino

- Location within Italy Location within Campania
- Coordinates: 41°9′10″N 15°5′20″E
- Country: Italy
- Region: Campania
- Province: Avellino (AV)

Government
  - Mayor: Mario Ferrante

Area
  - Total: 186.74 km^{2} (72.10 sq mi)
- Elevation: 788 m (2,585 ft)
- Highest elevation: 811 m (2,661 ft)
- Lowest elevation: 179 m (587 ft)

Population (31 August 2025)
  - Total: 20,644
  - Density: 110.55/km^{2} (286.32/sq mi)
- Demonym: Arianese
- Time zone: UTC+1 (CET)
  - Summer (DST): UTC+2 (CEST)
- Postal code: 83031
- Dialing code: 0825
- ISTAT code: 064005
- Patron saint: Otho Frangipane
- Saint day: 23 March
- Website: Official website

Ariano Irpino (Italian pronunciation: [aˈrjaːno irˈpiːno]), known until 1930 as Ariano di Puglia, and historically and in the local dialect simply as Ariano, is an Italian commune with a population of 20,706 inhabitants located in the Province of Avellino within the Campania region.

Perched atop a highland straddling the Apennines and endowed with an expansive territory at the crossroads of ancient routes, this small town swiftly gained strategic prominence, rising from the Early Middle Ages to become the seat of both the Diocese of Ariano and the County of Ariano.

Chosen by King Roger II of Sicily as the venue for Assizes of Ariano, celebrated for the artistry of its maiolica, the town proudly bears the title of city within the farthest reaches of the regional hinterland, directly bordering Apulia.

== Geography ==
=== Territory ===
The town of Ariano di Puglia is located on the Apennines and its territory extends on both sides of the mountain range.

— William Paget Jervis, I tesori dell'Italia sotterranea

The city is situated in the northern sector of Irpinia, occupying a central position between the Tyrrhenian Sea and the Adriatic Sea. The watershed indeed traverses its territory for dozens of kilometers, which is also crossed by the main pass of the Campanian Apennines: the Ariano Saddle. The rural expanse, abundant with springs, is bordered by the Ufita and Miscano rivers (sub-tributaries of the Volturno, on the Tyrrhenian side) and carved by the upper course of the Cervaro (a tributary of the Salso Lake and the Adriatic coast). Spanning 186.74 square kilometres (72.10 sq mi), it holds the distinction of being the largest municipality in Campania by area.

Legally recognized as entirely mountainous, its territory ranges in elevation from 179 to 811 m (2,661 ft) above sea level. The subsoil consists of layered clastic rocks (often rich in fossils) with a high content of calcium carbonate; the most prevalent formation is the characteristic Ariano unit, composed of Pliocene deposits of deltaic or marine origin. Overall, the soils exhibit good fertility and tree cover but are loosely consolidated, resulting in significant erosion. Exceptions include the broad, undulating plateaus in the northeastern extremities (between the Miscano Valley and the Cervaro basin), which rest on relatively older and more compact rocks, as well as the narrow alluvial plains at the opposite edge, near the confluence of the Fiumarelle stream into the Ufita Valley. Noteworthy is a sulfur water spring located between the Pignatale and Santa Regina districts, while a small salse emerges at the foot of the San Liberatore Sanctuary in the Acquasalza locality.

==== Tricolle ====
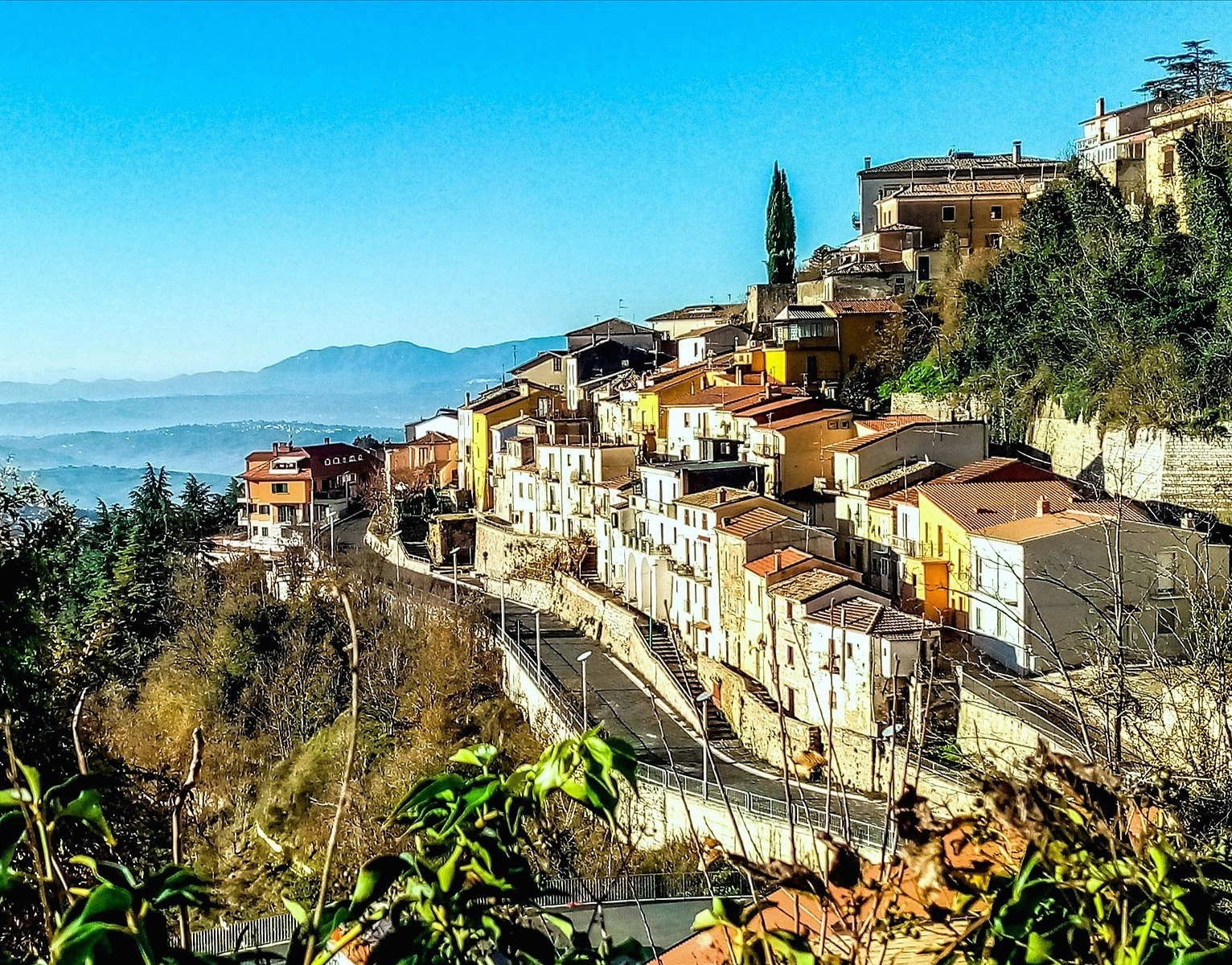
A glimpse of the historic city (view from the Castello hill)

The town center stands on three hills (Castello, Calvario, and San Bartolomeo), giving it the nickname City of the Three Knolls. From the town, mountain ranges are visible in all directions: the Taburno and Partenio Mountains to the west, the Terminio-Cervialto range and the Lucanian Apennines to the south, the Vulture and the Daunian Mountains to the east, and the Sannio Apennines to the north, with the Matese massif and, in the distance, the peaks of the Abruzzo Apennines and the Volsci Mountains. Six of Italy's twenty regions can be seen from Ariano. The Tricolle is also depicted in the municipal coat of arms, traditionally designed, according to legend, by the patron saint Ottone Frangipane (who lived in Ariano during the 12th century).

=== Seismicity ===
Located near the northern edge of the seismic district of Irpinia, the city has also been affected by tremors originating in the adjacent Sannio, such as the 1349 earthquake and the 1688 Sannio earthquake. Conversely, events with epicenters in southern Irpinia have proven relatively less destructive; for instance, the 1980 Irpinia earthquake resulted in only one fatality within the city limits.

Ten major earthquakes occurred between 1300 and 2000 (in 1349, 1456, 1517, 1688, 1694, 1702, 1732, 1930, 1962, and 1980), averaging one every 70 years, though intervals ranged from a minimum of 6 to a maximum of 198 years. Information from earlier centuries is scarce, with only one documented earthquake (in 988, causing extensive damage). Archaeological investigations at the Aequum Tuticum site have uncovered evidence of two severe earthquakes in the 4th century, while documentary analysis suggests that the earthquakes of 847 and 1125 were also intense.

The reference seismic station, operated by the National Institute of Geophysics and Volcanology, is located at the Ariano Saddle near the Biogem research center (code: Biog, elevation: 623 m (2,044 ft)).

- Seismic classification: Zone 1 (high seismicity).

=== Climate ===
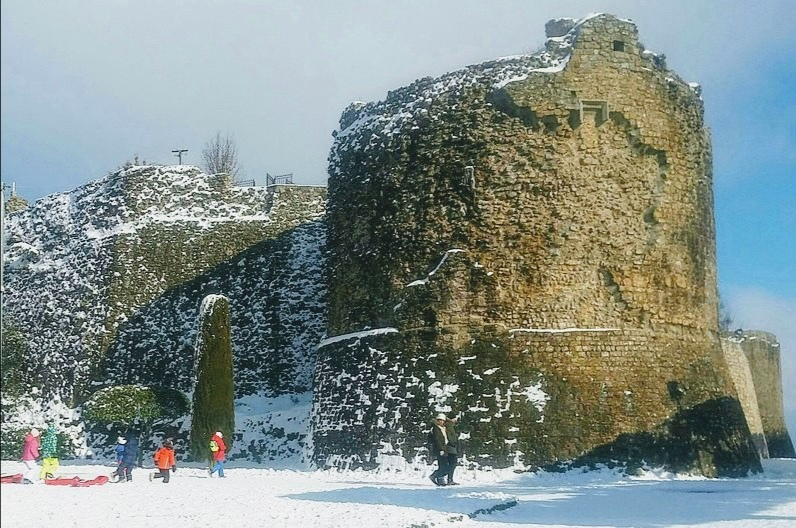
A view of Ariano Castle in winter

The local climate is notably variable, exhibiting transitional traits between the humid temperate climate of the high Apennine mountains and the Mediterranean climate typical of coastal areas.

Precipitation is moderate, generally not exceeding 800 millimetres (31 in) annually, with roughly two-thirds occurring between autumn and winter (peaking around November–December), while spring and especially summer see sporadic rainfall (with the lowest levels typically in July–August). Rain is the predominant form of precipitation year-round, though the colder half of the year often brings occasional snowfall of varying intensity, while the warmer months may see rare hailstorms. Fog is infrequent, and prevailing winds blow from the west.

The Ariano Irpino weather station is situated in the upper part of the city at an elevation of 794 m (2,605 ft). Mathematical analysis of temperature averages from the reference period of 1961–1990 reveals that the lowest temperatures typically occur in late January (the coldest month, averaging +3.8 °C), while the highest are recorded in early August (the warmest month, averaging +21.6 °C), which also marks the greatest diurnal temperature variation. The smallest range occurs in mid-December, with temperatures closest to the annual average of +12.3 °C recorded in early May and late October.

Climate data for Ariano Irpino
Month	Jan	Feb	Mar	Apr	May	Jun	Jul	Aug	Sep	Oct	Nov	Dec	Year
Mean daily maximum °C (°F)	7.1 (44.8)	7.8 (46.0)	10.4 (50.7)	14.5 (58.1)	18.6 (65.5)	23.6 (74.5)	27.1 (80.8)	27.2 (81.0)	23.2 (73.8)	17.4 (63.3)	12.0 (53.6)	8.8 (47.8)	16.5 (61.7)
Mean daily minimum °C (°F)	0.6 (33.1)	0.9 (33.6)	3.0 (37.4)	6.1 (43.0)	9.7 (49.5)	13.7 (56.7)	16.0 (60.8)	16.0 (60.8)	13.9 (57.0)	9.6 (49.3)	5.6 (42.1)	2.7 (36.9)	8.2 (46.7)

== Etymology ==
O Ariano, you who were our stronghold;
now, turned foe, you have defied our commands. [...]
I believe it is because you feel secure, perched atop the mountain; [...]
our return will show you what a great offense means.
Ara Dei Iani, quæ camera nostra fuisti;
nunc, hostis effecta, nostra legata fugisti. [...]
Credo quod confidis, montis stabilita per altum; [...]
monstrabit reditus, quod sit offensio grandis.

— Frederick II, Itinerarium

Based on a bitter medieval quotation, tentatively attributed to Emperor Frederick II, it was long believed that the toponym "Ariano" derived from the Latin Ara Dei Iani ("Altar of the God Janus") or simply Ara Iani ("Altar of Janus"), alluding to a supposed pagan shrine atop the Tricolle in ancient times. According to tradition, the remains of this sanctuary were unearthed as early as the 12th century. The initials AI, which replaced the original letter A in the municipal coat of arms since the late 18th century, indeed stand for Ara Iani. The 19th-century poet Pietro Paolo Parzanese offered lukewarm support for these conjectures, which were definitively debunked by a meticulous study conducted by geographer Gabriele Grasso late in the same century.

Although clay artifacts linked to an ancient temple have indeed been found in the foundations of the cathedral, contemporary scholars consider it more plausible that "Ariano" (recorded in this form as early as 782) is a praedial attribute tied to the personal name Ario (corresponding to a gentilicium *Arius, likely a variant of Arrius). Thus, the true etymological meaning is likely "land of Ario" (in Latin *praedium Arianum) or "castle of Ario" (castellum Arianum, a form documented in the 9th century), presuming Ario was a landowner from late antiquity or a warlord of the early Middle Ages. Alternatively, the toponym might directly stem from the personal name Ariano (in Latin *Arianus) or a similar surname Ariano, though it is equally possible that the surname derives from the toponym instead.

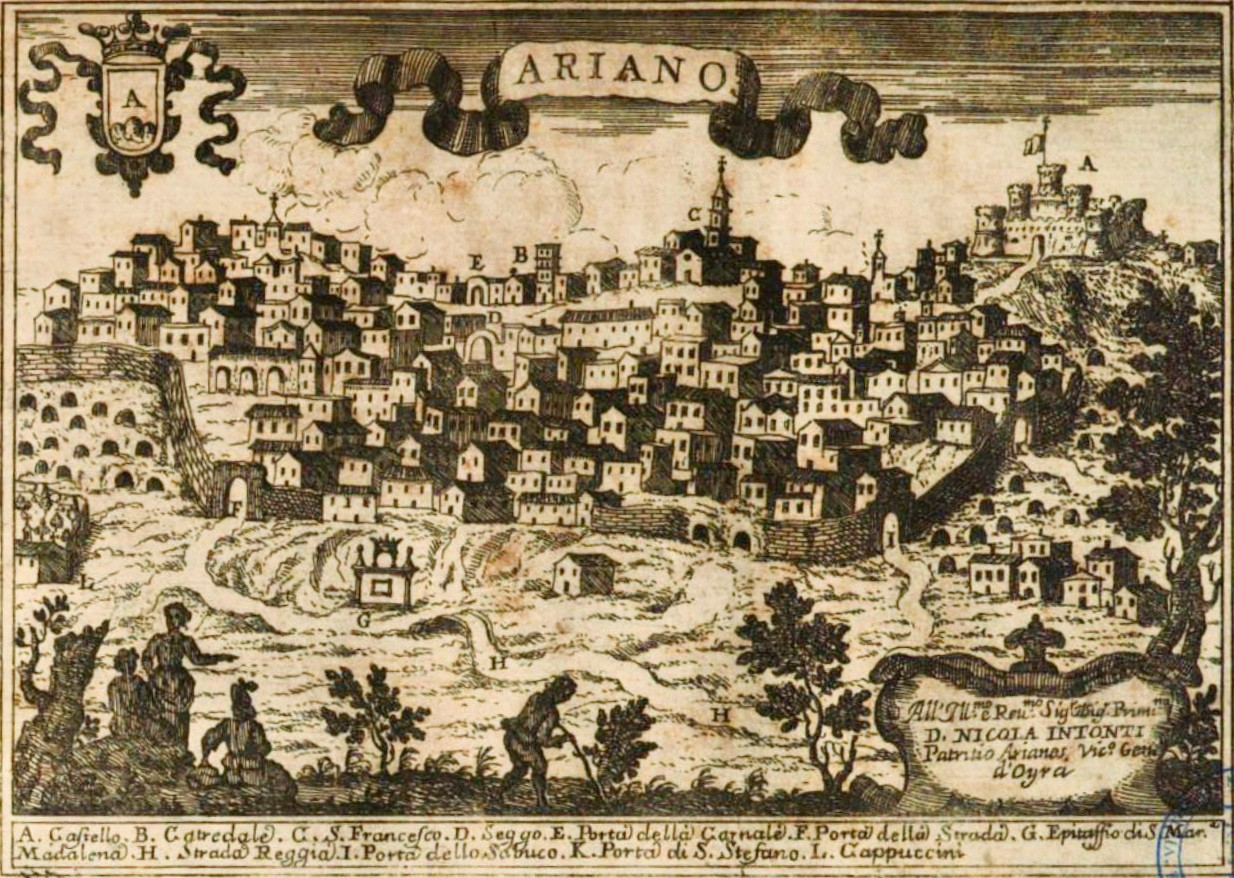
A 1703 print; at the time, the city was simply called Ariano, and its coat of arms bore only the letter A

The designation "Ariano Irpino" (referring to the historic-geographic district of Irpinia) replaced the older "Ariano di Puglia" in 1930, the latter having been officially adopted in 1868 but commonly used in prior eras as well. In the 14th century, the medieval Latin name was Arianum in Apulia, as "Puglia" ("Apulia") then denoted the entire peninsular sector of the Kingdom of Sicily, particularly the vast Duchy of Apulia (ducatus Apuliæ), to which the Grand County of Ariano had been subject since the 11th century. The town's original ties to the land of the ancient Hirpini were well-known to the local educated elite, as evidenced by the 1512 verse of the neo-Latin poet Girolamo Angeriano: est urbs Hirpinis Arianum in collibus ("the city of Ariano in the Hirpini lies on the hills"). The addition of an epithet to "Ariano" was, in any case, intended to avoid confusion with other places with the same name, notably Ariano nel Polesine (once part of the Ferrara area).

== History ==
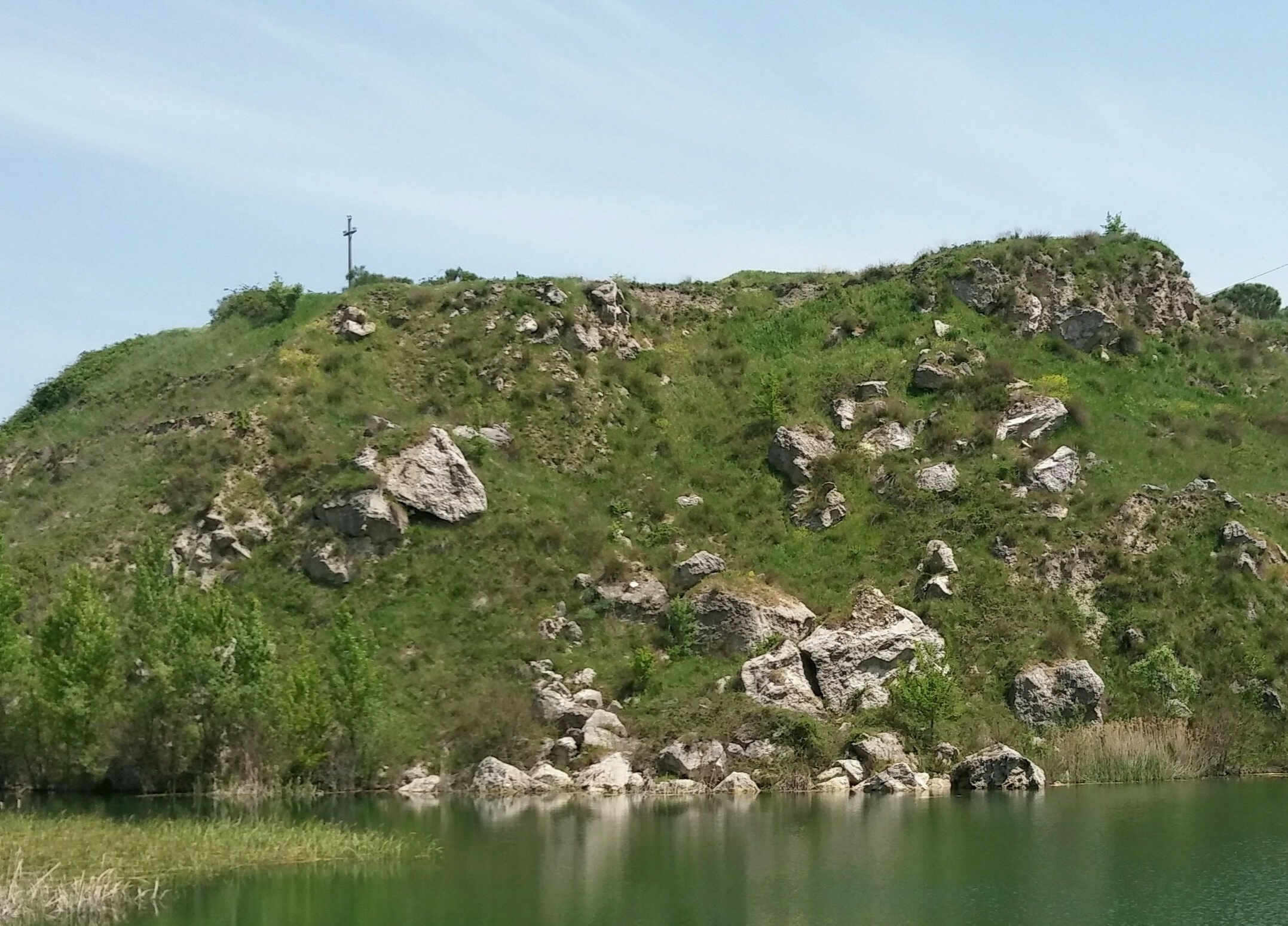
The cliff of La Starza, inhabited for millennia in prehistoric times

=== Prehistory ===
The earliest human traces appear in the northern sector of the municipal territory. Along the Camporeale Saddle, numerous and diverse chipped flint tools, attributable to the Mousterian industry practiced in the Middle Paleolithic by Neanderthal hunter-gatherers, have been found on the surface or just below it.

The first stable agro-pastoral settlement, the oldest in the region, emerges on the chalky cliff of La Starza, near a perennial spring at its base. There, remnants of an entire village of huts from the Lower Neolithic have been uncovered, occupied continuously until the threshold of the Iron Age. Evidence from the Middle-Upper Neolithic also surfaces elsewhere (in the localities of Acquazzuolo, Santa Maria a Tuori, Trimonti), extending to the southern part of the rural area (on the San Marco hillock near the Fiumarelle stream).

=== Protohistory ===
The initial Apennine peoples give way to the Hirpini, a warlike Italic tribe of Samnite ethnicity and Oscan language, who settled the territory in pre-Roman times. To this civilization belong the varied artistic pottery (including the kantharos type) found in the burial goods of small local necropolises, linked to the so-called Casalbore-Castelbaronia culture (6th–5th centuries BC), typical of northern Irpinia.

No traces of Samnite fortifications have been found, possibly because they were incorporated into the deep foundations of the medieval castle. However, some clay materials unearthed beneath the cathedral basilica suggest at least the presence of a religious structure (likely an Italic temple) on the Tricolle ridge.

=== Roman era ===
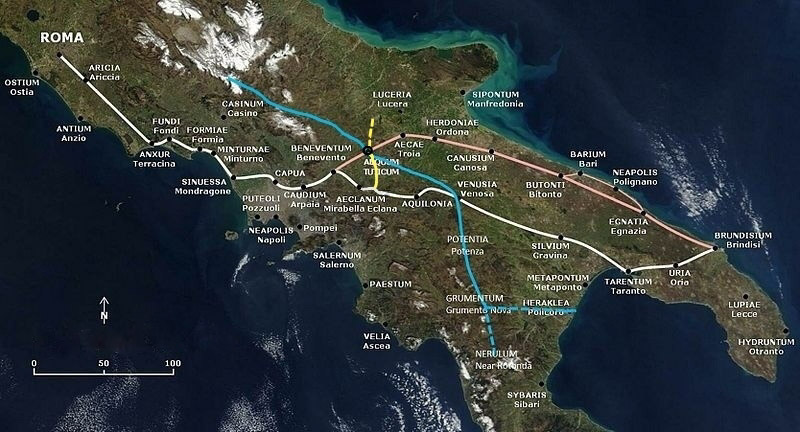
Aequum Tuticum at the intersection of the Aemilia (in yellow), Herculia (in blue), and Traiana (formerly Minucia, in red) roads, relative to the older, off-center Appia (in white).

From the Republican period, three consular roads traverse the area: the Via Aemilia (evidenced solely by two miliaria, both discovered within the municipal territory), the Via Minucia (later realigned under Emperor Trajan and renamed the Via Traiana)), and a third whose name is unknown but whose route is well-documented in the Antonine Itinerary. In the early Low Roman Empire, this last road was fully modernized and incorporated into the Via Herculia, a major artery running longitudinally through the Apennines.

At the crossroads of these three roads, on the vast Sant’Eleuterio plateau near the northern edges of the rural area, lies the vicus of Aequum Tuticum, the latter part of its name having pre-Latin origins (in Oscan, tuticum meant "public," pertaining to the touto). First mentioned by Cicero in 50 BC, Aequum Tuticum reached its zenith during the Trajanic and Hadrianic eras. Repeatedly damaged by earthquakes between 346 and 375 AD, the vicus eventually dwindled to a mere villa, one of many scattered across the countryside of the late empire.

=== Early Middle Ages ===
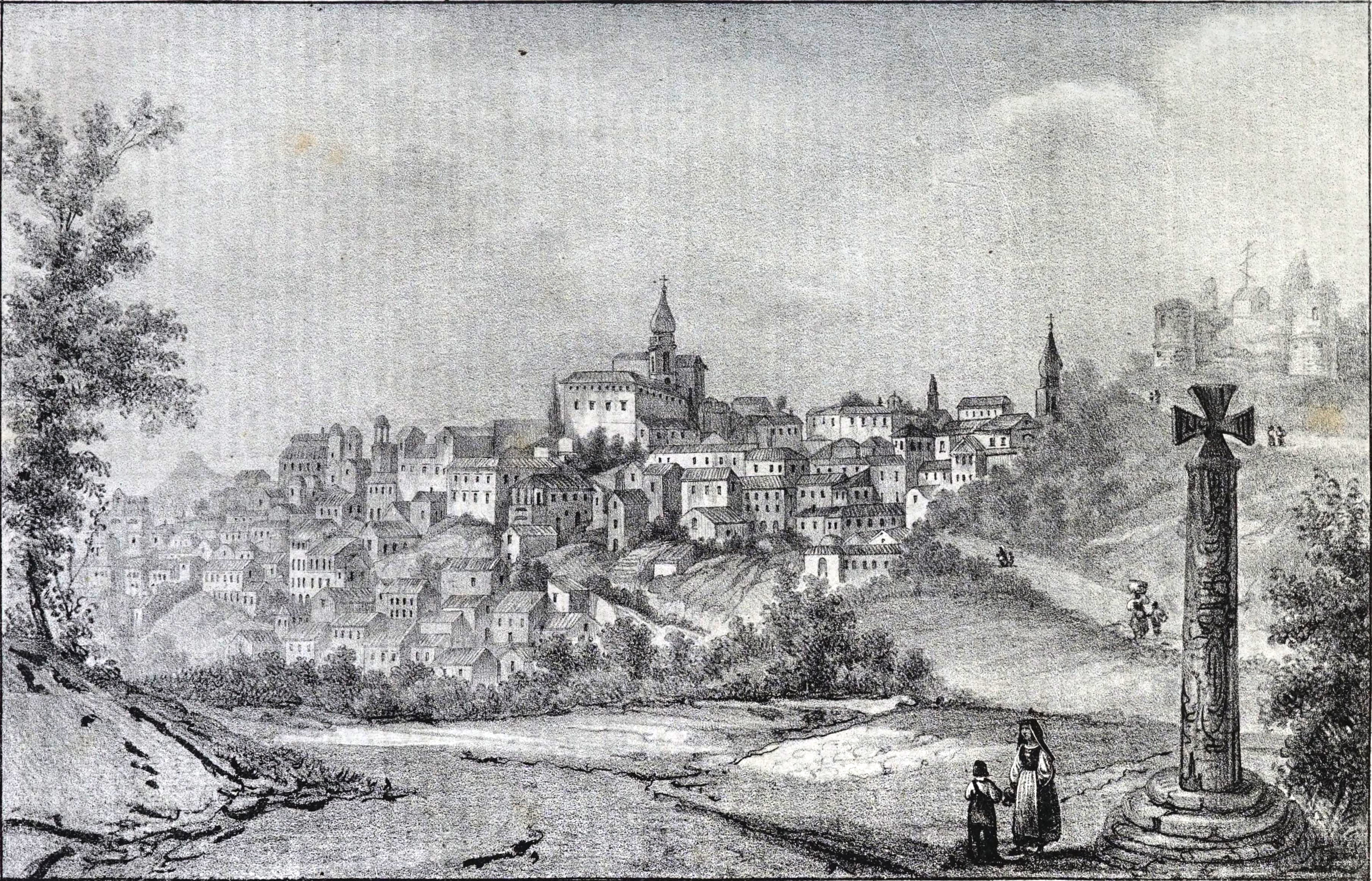
Perspective view from the Piano della Croce, at the foot of the Ariano Castle; in the foreground, the medieval Lombard Cross is visible.

The repeated Barbarian invasions of the 5th and 6th centuries precipitated the rapid decline of ancient villae and other scattered settlements. The bloody wars waged by the Byzantine Empire against the Ostrogoths and Lombards drove soldiers and civilians to seek refuge on the Tricolle, a higher and more defensible location. With the rise of the Lombards in the Duchy of Benevento (7th–8th centuries), the first fortified structures of the Ariano Castle were erected to guard against Byzantine territories.

From the mid-9th century, however, the Principality of Benevento fell into crisis, first suffering the devastating effects of the 847 earthquake (which also damaged the original Ariano Cathedral), followed by the secession of Salerno and subsequent Saracen raids (reaching the Ariano countryside in 858), and finally subjugation to Capua after a period of Byzantine occupation (likely involving the Gastaldate of Ariano in 891–895). Around 988, another earthquake devastated both the County of Ariano (which had replaced the gastaldate) and Benevento.

Between 1016 and 1022, amid an increasingly unstable sociopolitical context, the county was usurped by a band of Norman knights led by Gilbert Buatère, hired by Melus of Bari, a Lombard noble appointed Duke of Apulia (in an anti-Byzantine role) by Emperor Henry II. This marked the birth of the first Norman dominion on Italian soil.

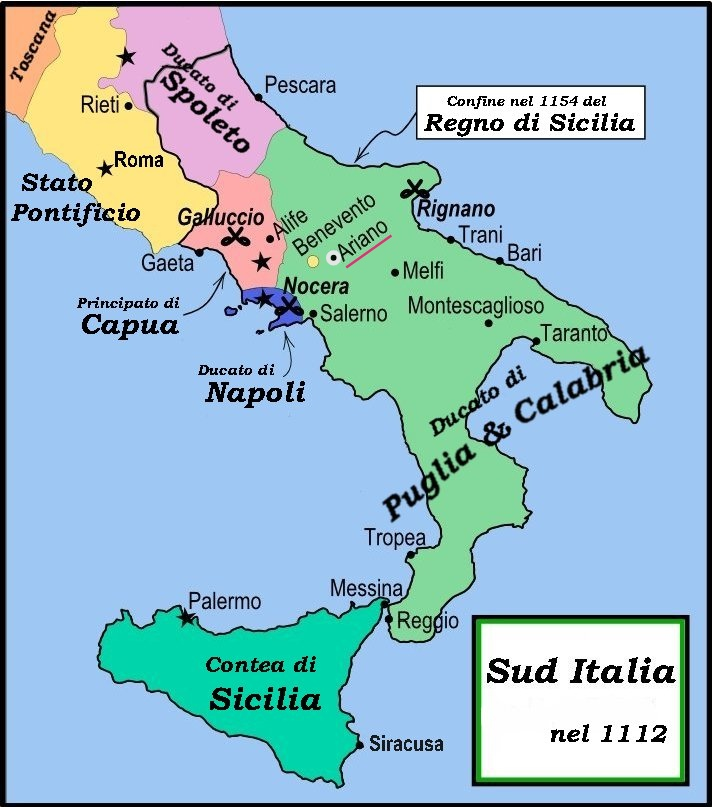
Southern Italy in the 12th century, the era of Ariano’s greatest splendor

In the ensuing decades, thanks to the victorious Norman conquest of southern Italy, Ariano assumed a position of paramount importance: the castle was fortified, and the city was established as the head of a vast county. Even the 1125 earthquake appeared to cause minimal damage, except in some outlying areas. During this historical phase, Ottone Frangipane (died 1127) lived and worked in Ariano, later canonized and chosen as the town's patron saint.

In 1140, King Roger II, after ousting the last grand count, took up residence in the stronghold and promptly convened the Assizes of Ariano. Before the general assembly (curia procerum) of the Duchy of Apulia and Calabria, the king ordered a new coin to be minted (the ducale, better known as the ducat), promulgated an extensive series of legislative acts, and, according to established historiographical tradition, issued the statutes (constitutiones) of the Kingdom of Sicily. This legislative corpus, a synthesis of various distinguished legal traditions, was later adopted with minor amendments in the Constitutions of Melfi.

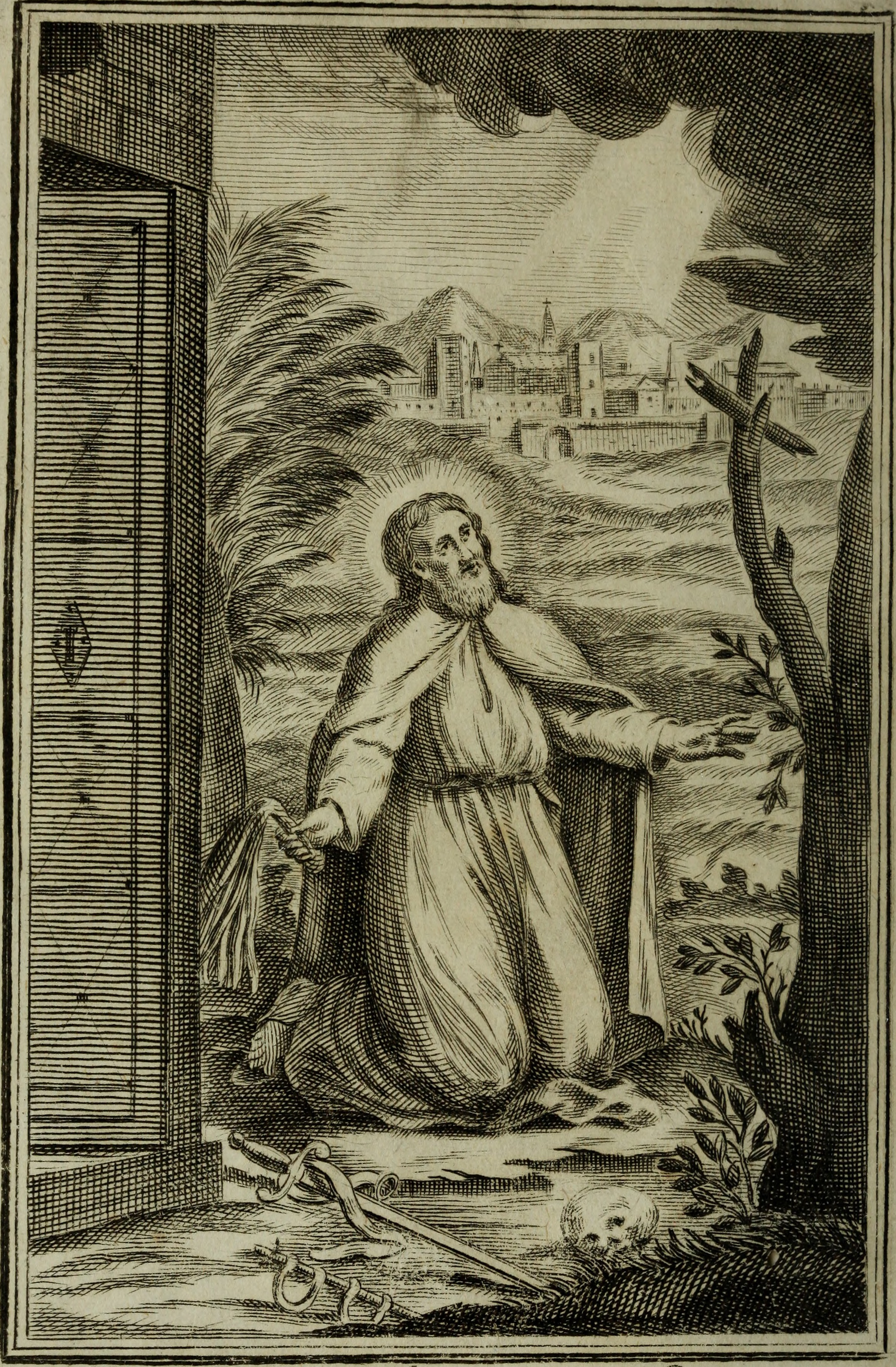
The patron saint Ottone Frangipane, active in Ariano during the medieval era

=== Late Middle Ages ===
The ascension of the Swabian dynasty ushered in a markedly troubled period. In 1255, Manfred (son of Frederick II) besieged the city, which had supported the papal army against him. Fortified with sturdy walls and a substantial arsenal ("royal chamber"), Ariano resisted fiercely until a large contingent of Luceran soldiers, posing as deserters from Manfred's forces, were allowed into the fortress. That night, they revealed their true intent, pillaging and burning buildings while massacring the inhabitants in the infamous Carnale massacre.

In 1269, Charles I of Anjou, having defeated Manfred at the Battle of Benevento and seized the kingdom, resolved to rebuild the city, now deemed significant ("famous"). In recognition of its loyalty to the papacy, he gifted the Diocese of Ariano two Holy Thorns (given to him by his brother Louis IX of France), still preserved in the Museum of Silver.

Under the Angevins, the city's territory absorbed the former baronial fiefs of Amando, San Donato, and Sant'Eleuterio (the latter two managed by the bishopric until the 19th-century subversion) and possibly others. For extended periods, Monteleone was also a hamlet of Ariano. From 1294 to 1413, the county was governed by members of the Sabran family; notable among them were Saint Elzéar and his wife Delphine, later venerated as co-patrons.

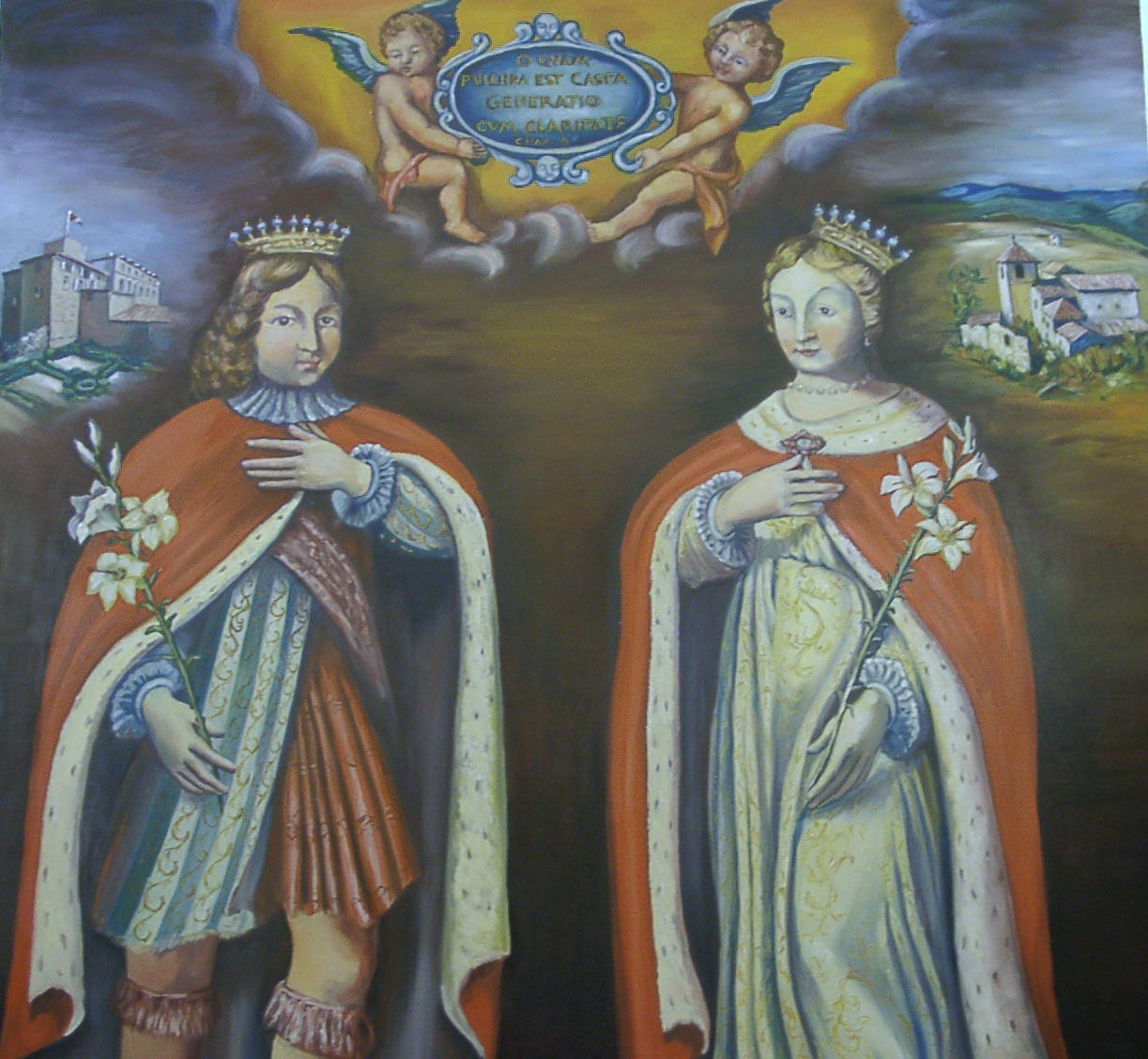
Saint Elzéar and Blessed Delphine, counts and co-patrons of Ariano, also revered in their native Provence

After suffering severe damage from the 1349 earthquake, the city felt the strain of the early 15th-century struggle between the Angevins and Aragonese for control of the Kingdom of Naples. In 1417, the county passed to Francesco Sforza, a condottiero and future Duke of Milan, and in 1440, it was granted by King Alfonso to the grand seneschal Innico de Guevara, one of his finest generals during the kingdom's conquest.

Along with the rest of the realm, the city was then devastated by the 1456 earthquake and the 1458 plague. This occurred nearly midway through Aragonese rule, which lasted until 1485 when Pietro, Innico's son, lost the county due to his involvement in the Conspiracy of the Barons. The city returned to the royal domain for a decade.

=== Early Modern era ===
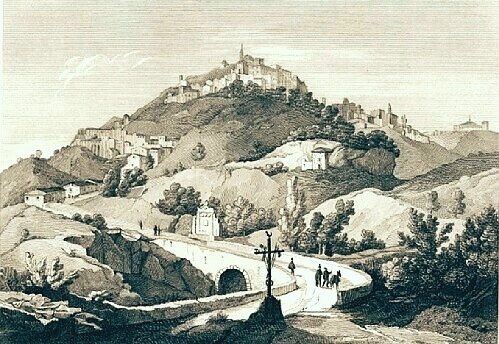
An old depiction of the city; in the foreground, the Royal Road of the Puglie from the then-capital Naples.

In 1495, the county was acquired by Alberico Carafa, who, three years later, secured the ducal title from King Ferdinand II of Naples. The timing was inauspicious, however, as the city's strategic position embroiled it in the Italian Wars between France, Spain, and the Holy Roman Empire. Despite brief truces (marred by the 1517 earthquake and the 1528 plague), the conflicts persisted for decades, inflicting immense damage both within the city walls (where even church bells were melted down to make weapons) and in the countryside (where olive and other trees were cut down to fuel the foundries). In 1528, the populace was punished by imperial forces for its alleged pro-French stance, enduring a sack. As compensation for these misfortunes, the city received the royal privilege to establish several annual fairs to be held in perpetuity.

Since 1532, the Duchy of Ariano had passed from the Carafa to the Gonzaga and, in 1577, to the Gesualdo. Yet the feudal regime was nearing its end: on August 2, 1585, at great cost, Ariano redeemed itself, was reintegrated into the royal domain, and became a royal city—the only one in the Principato Ultra—and thus came directly under the control of the Viceroys of Naples. The robust population growth, already notable under the Gonzaga, continued for many decades: by 1622, Ariano was by far the most populous community in the Principato Ultra, with 1,899 hearths (compared to just 516 in Avellino, not yet a provincial capital).

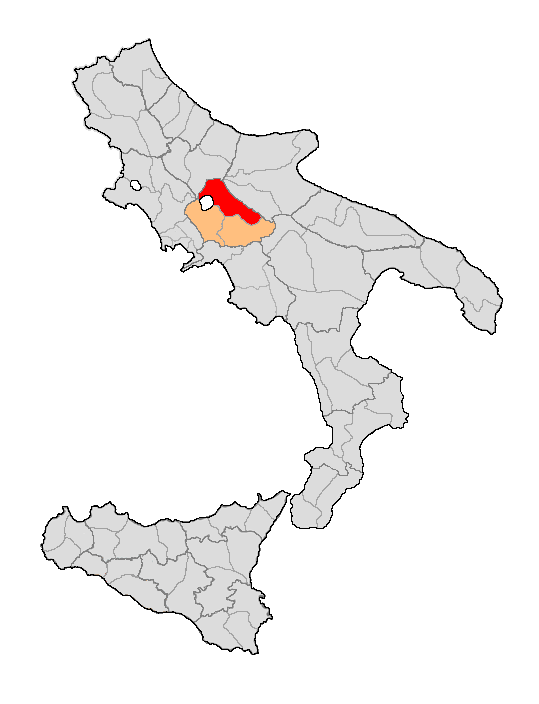
The Ariano District within the Principato Ultra province, in the Kingdom of the Two Sicilies

In 1639, a protracted legal dispute arose when the city, although owned by the State, was enfeoffed to the Duke Carlo Antonio Guevara of Bovino. The ruling from the Supreme Council of Italy, favoring the citizens, arrived only twenty-three years later. In 1647–48, the populace staunchly resisted the Masaniello uprisings but succumbed to siege and plunder by Neapolitan rebels for blocking their grain shipments from Apulia.

The plague of 1656, which decimated the population, wiped out entire villages (including the hamlet of Corsano, in the diocese of Ariano). Within decades, a severe seismic crisis followed: the 1688 Sannio earthquake was succeeded by the 1694 Basilicata earthquake, the 1702 Benevento earthquake, and the 1732 Irpinia earthquake. Nevertheless, positioned at the pass of the newly upgraded Royal Road of the Puglie, the city soon regained its pivotal role, hosting the Royal Consulate of Commerce from 1743–46 (with jurisdiction over 64 municipalities) and, from 1806, the Ariano District. This triggered a new phase of slow but steady demographic growth. Much of the population remained loyal to the Bourbons, resisting the Risorgimento movements but later falling prey to brigandage.

=== Contemporary era ===
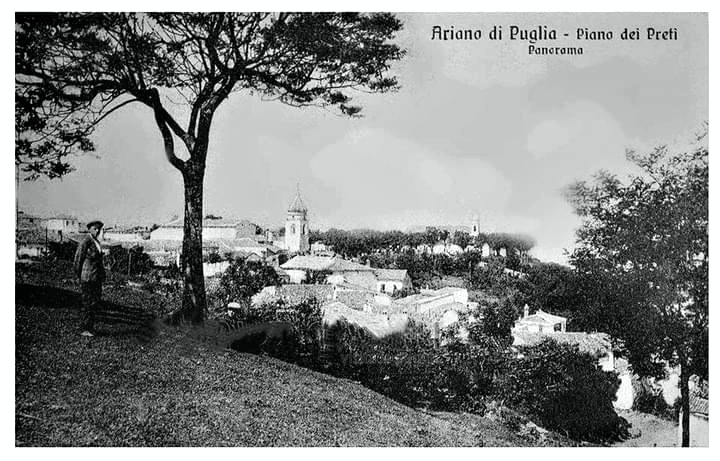
A vintage photo of the old Borgo della guardia viewed from the Piano dei Preti (in the municipal park, at the northern foot of the Norman Castle). In the background, the Calvario hill topped by its namesake church (destroyed by the 1962 earthquake and replaced by the modern Palace of Justice).

In the post-unification period, the city served as the seat of the Ariano di Puglia District, abolished in 1926. A few years later, in 1930, the territory was struck by the 1930 Vulture earthquake. During World War II, when a Fascist internment camp was established on the outskirts of the city, Allied bombing targeted even the train station, though the population reached its historical peak in the postwar years. Damaged by the 1962 Irpinia earthquake (preceded by a warning tremor), the city was later impacted by the 1980 Irpinia earthquake, which, among other losses, caused the collapse of the cathedral's bell tower onto the adjacent square (miraculously sparing the many passersby). In response to these calamities, urban expansion progressed along the peripheral slopes, though this was not matched by population growth.

=== Symbols ===

The municipal coat of arms and gonfalon were officially recognized by a decree of the President of the Republic on June 12, 1984.

The coat of arms of the Municipality of Ariano Irpino is argent with three green hills, in natural form, surmounted by the azure inscription A I (Ara Iani)

The gonfalon is a vertically divided banner of green and white.

=== Honors ===
Title of City - ribbon for ordinary uniform

Title of City
"Decree of the President of the Republic"
— 26 October 1952

== Monuments and places of interest ==
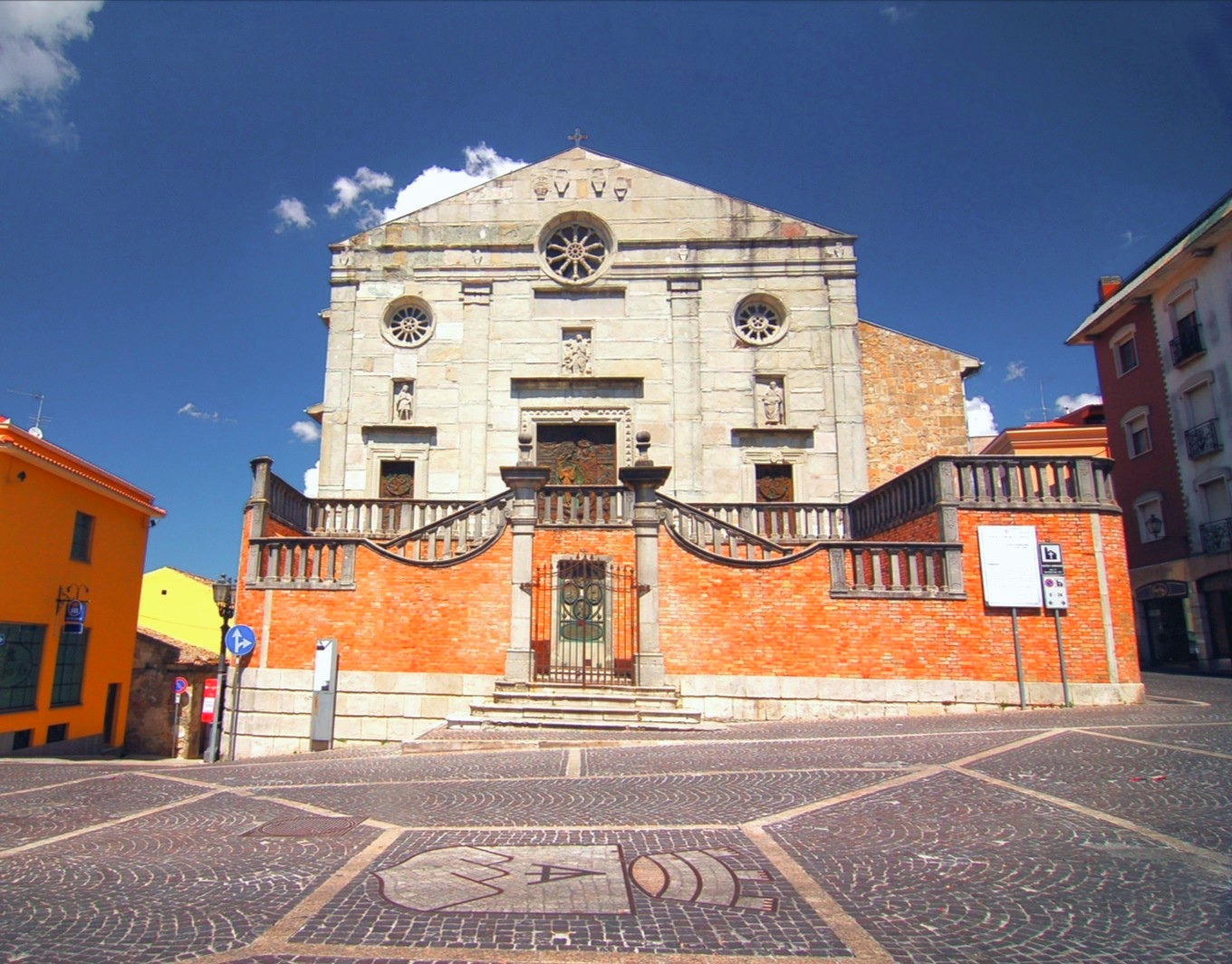
The 16th-century façade of the basilica cathedral

=== Religious architecture ===
Cathedral of Santa Maria Assunta

Built atop the ruins of an ancient pagan temple, the basilica cathedral is dedicated to Our Lady of the Assumption (titular), Saint Ottone (patron), and Saint Elzéar (co-patron), whose statues adorn the portals. The interior is replete with artworks from various periods. Designated a national monument since 1940, it was elevated to minor basilica status by Pope John Paul II in 1984.

Church of San Michele Arcangelo

Of Lombard origin (documented since the 10th century), it was damaged by the 1456 earthquake and rebuilt following the 1732 Irpinia earthquake. The stone entrance portal dates to 1747. Inside, a wooden statue of the Archangel Michael is a highlight.

Church and Convent of San Francesco Saverio

Erected on the site of the former hospital for pilgrims and the sick (relocated to an adjacent building by 1731), it is maintained by the Oblate Sisters of Saint Francis Xavier. Inside, a bas-relief of the patron Saint Ottone and a statue of Saint James the Great, patron of pilgrims, are notable; the convent’s portal was once one of the city’s ancient gates.

Church and Convent of Sant’Anna

Located behind the town hall and cared for by the Sisters of the Holy Spirit, it preserves two 17th-century altars and the tomb of Giuseppina Arcucci, founder of the congregation.

Church of Sant’Andrea

Adjacent to the Duchess’s Palace, near the central Piazza Plebiscito, it dates to the 15th century.

Church of Sant’Agostino

Built near the ancient seat in Piazza Ferrara, it houses a 16th-century altar of the Consolation, topped by a grey stone arch from Roseto, adorned with symbolic friezes and sculptures.

Lombard Cross

Positioned at the southern foot of the Ariano Castle, this austere stone cross in Lombard style rests on a classical cipollino marble column. Despite its simplicity, it is the city’s oldest intact monument.

Church of San Pietro alla Guardia

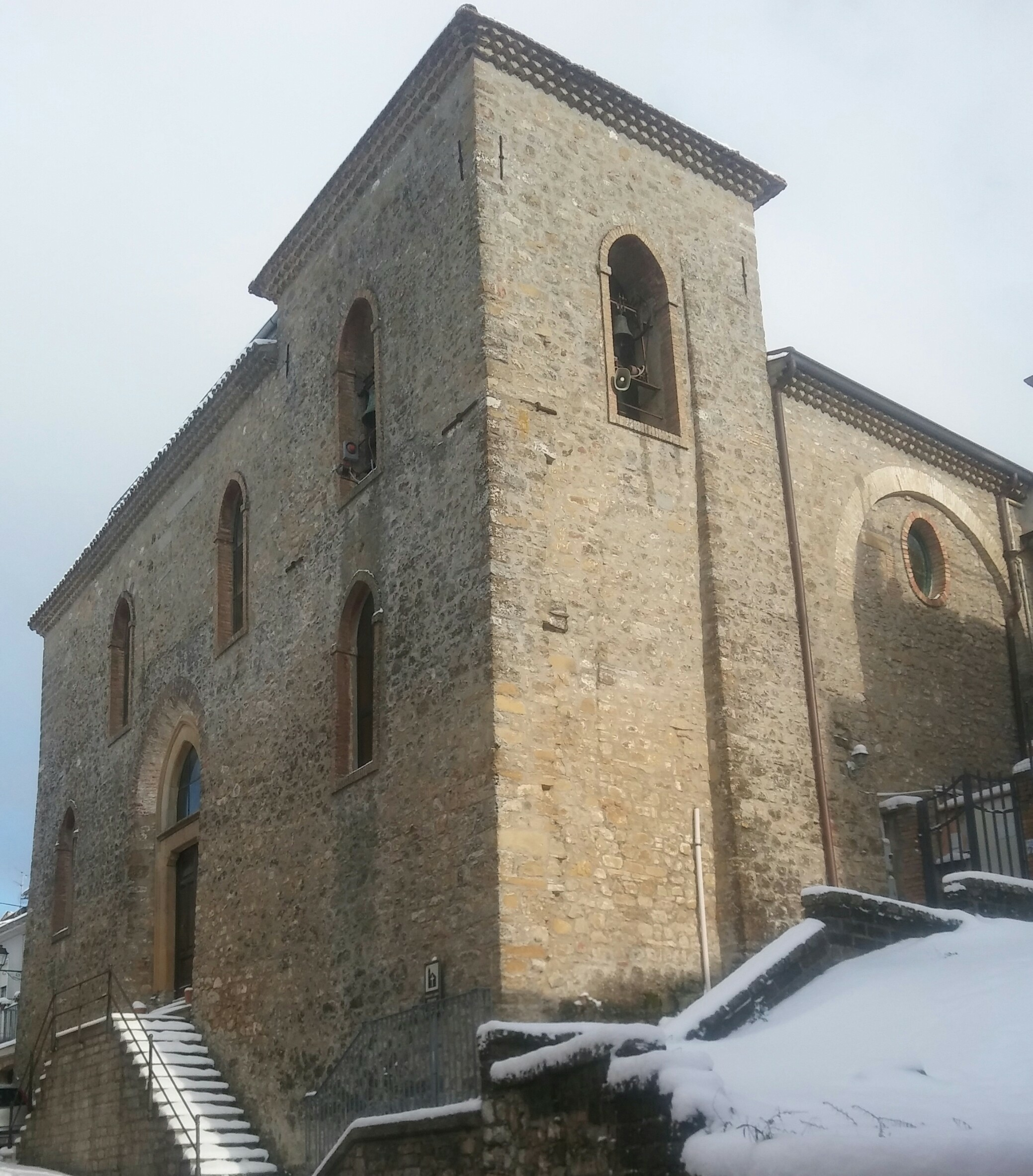
San Pietro alla Guardia

Situated in the historic Guardia district, it is documented from 1270 but was rebuilt after the 1456 earthquake; its portals date to 1459. The late Gothic façade and 15th-century altar are particularly noteworthy.

Church of San Giovanni Battista

Located at the pass of the Royal Road of the Puglie (later National Road of the Puglie), it was reconstructed after the 1732 Irpinia earthquake but retains an ancient chalice-shaped baptismal font.

Church of the Madonna del Carmine

Built in 1688 along the same royal road, it received royal patronage in 1696 thanks to the quality of its construction.

Church of San Pietro de’ Reclusis

Nestled in the eponymous district at the base of the historic center, it houses 16th-century frescoes. Nearby, beneath a centuries-old linden tree, lies the hermitage where Ottone Frangipane spent his final years, near the Civil Hospital named in his honor.

Church of the Crucifix

Situated along the path to Saint Ottone’s hermitage, it was built following a miraculous event attributed to the saint.

Grotto of Santa Maria di Lourdes

A faithful replica of the famous Massabielle Grotto, it opens directly onto the National Road of the Puglie. Consecrated in 1922.

Church of Santa Maria del Loreto

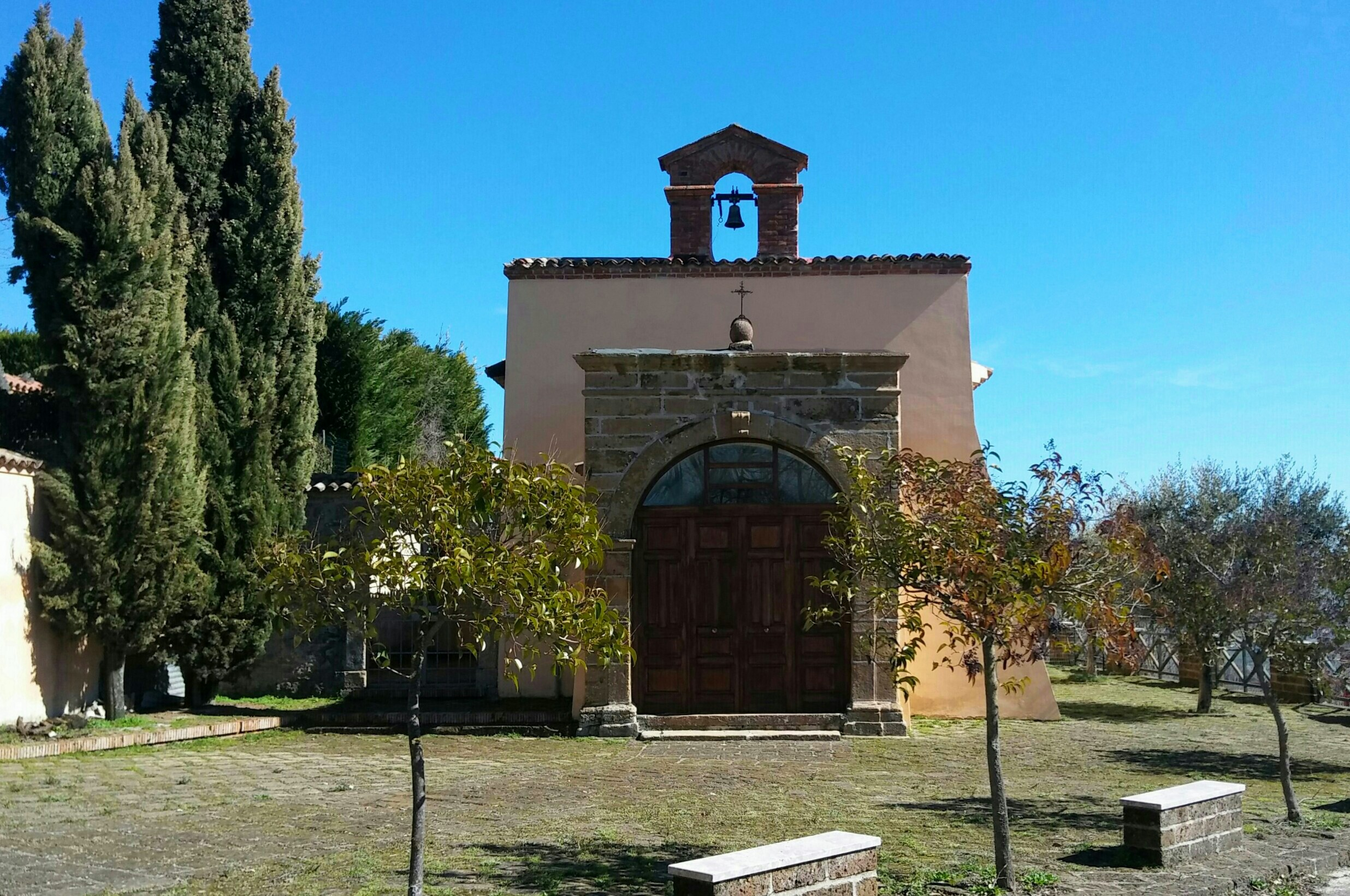
The Loreto Church

Occupying a broad natural terrace below the castle, it has been altered multiple times and is mentioned (with an attached room and garden) in a 1517 inventory delivered to Bishop Diomede Carafa.

Church of the Martyrs

Built in the 16th century in the outlying district of the same name, the portal of the church has the image of the aforementioned Bishop (later Cardinal) Carafa.

Valleluogo Sanctuary

Rising at the site of an ancient Marian apparition, near a historic mill, it is located in a valley rich in water and ancient trees, a pilgrimage destination since the late Middle Ages.

San Liberatore Sanctuary

Perched on an olive-clad hillock, it has drawn devotees of Saint Liberatore for centuries, as evidenced by the abundance of ex-voto offerings in its rooms. Rebuilt after the 1962 Irpinia earthquake, it is crowned by a tall bell tower.

=== Military architecture ===
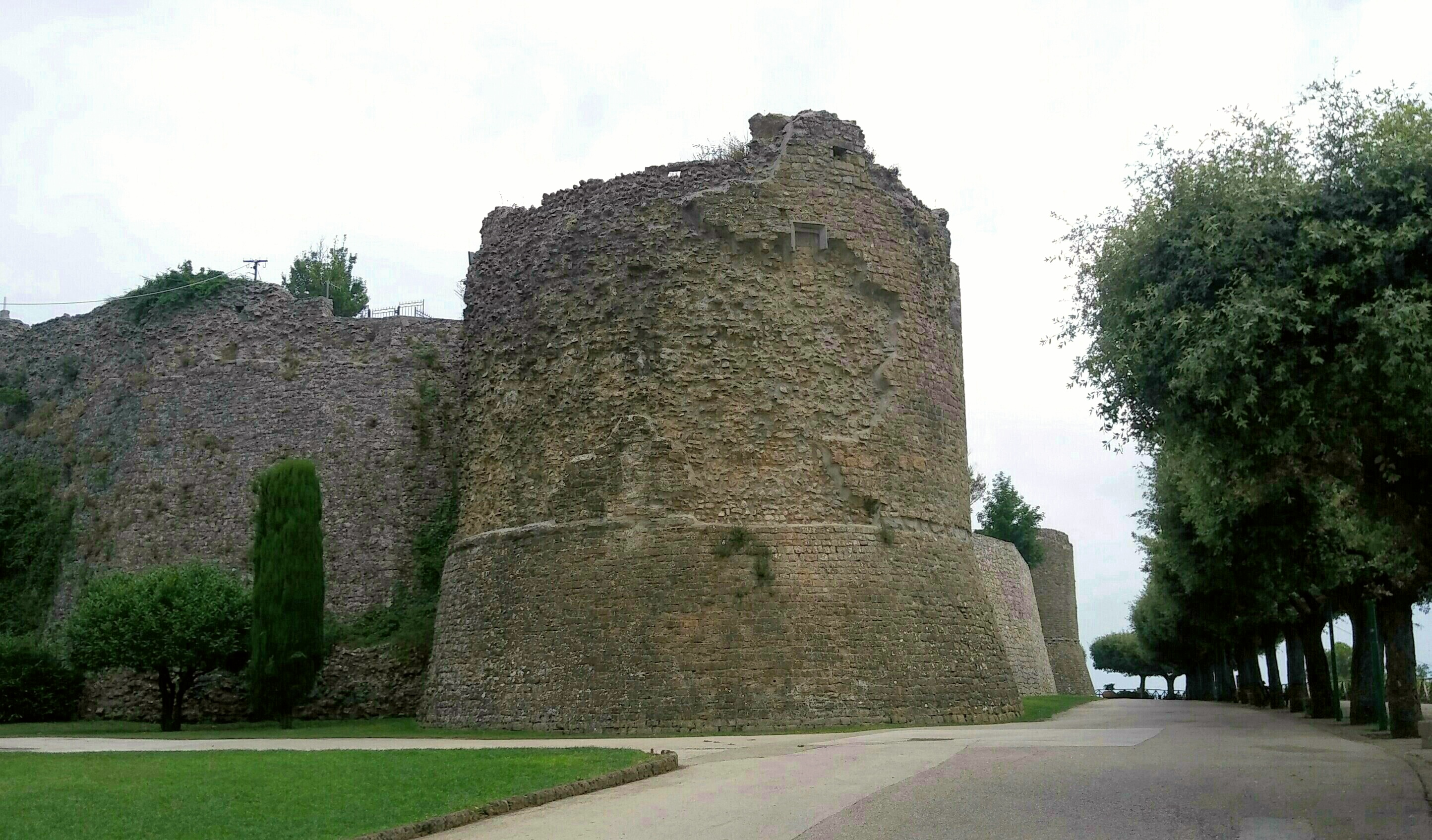
Partial view of the castle

Castle

Situated atop the eponymous hill, at the highest and most panoramic point of the municipal territory, it existed in Lombard times, was rebuilt by the Normans, and later renovated by the Angevins and Aragonese. Abandoned after the 16th-century Italian Wars, it underwent partial restoration at the dawn of the third millennium. The expansive municipal park surrounds the complex.

Towers

In the northeastern sector of the rural area, along the upper Cervaro Valley, three medieval watchtowers stand:

- The Torre delle Ciàvole, midway between the Difesa plateau and the Pianerottolo station, is the best-preserved, having long served as a farmhouse (ciàvola means "crow" in Arianese dialect);
- The Torretta di Camporeale, on the eponymous plateau at the eastern edge of the Ariano Saddle, was also converted into a farmhouse but soon abandoned;
- The Torre de li Pizzi, near the Tratturo Pescasseroli-Candela, along the route to the medieval village of Zungoli, survives as a ruin on a wooded peak overlooking the Cervaro River (pizzo means "peak").

A fourth tower, the Torre d’Amandi, once guarded the Ufita Valley but was demolished in 1767 by order of King Ferdinand IV of Naples, after it had become a hideout for robbers who attacked along the Royal Road of the Puglie, a route the king used during his hunts in the Bovino valley.

=== Civil architecture ===
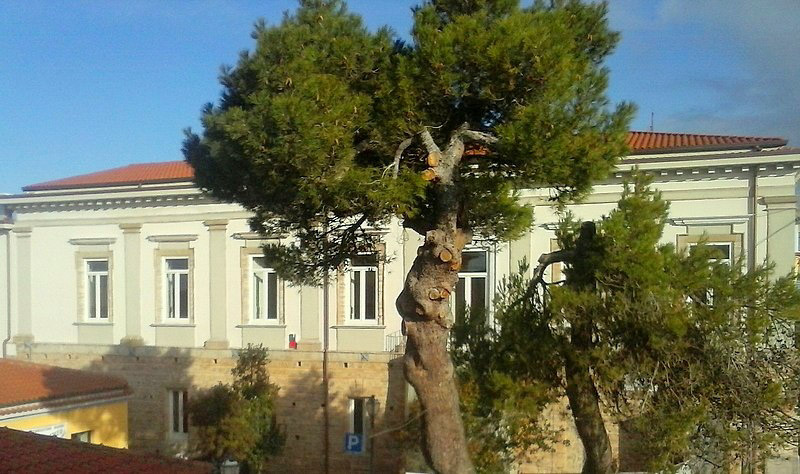
Bevere-Gambacorta Palace

==== Historic palaces ====
Bevere-Gambacorta Palace

Located near the San Francesco d’Assisi Diocesan Pastoral Center, it dates to the early 18th century. Home to the Biogem university consortium, it has housed the Museum of Norman Civilization since 2023.

San Giacomo Palace

Situated in the historic Tranesi district, long home to the Ariano majolica kilns, it served as the Civil Hospital between the 18th and 20th centuries. Since 2015, it has been the educational-scientific hub of the Civic Museum of Ceramics.

Forte Palace

Of ancient origin, expanded and modernized between the 17th and 18th centuries, it hosted the Ariano di Puglia subprefecture until 1926. Since 1991, it has been the seat of the Civic Museum of Ceramics, with its lower level housing artifacts from the Archaeological Museum.

De Piano-Aliperta Palace

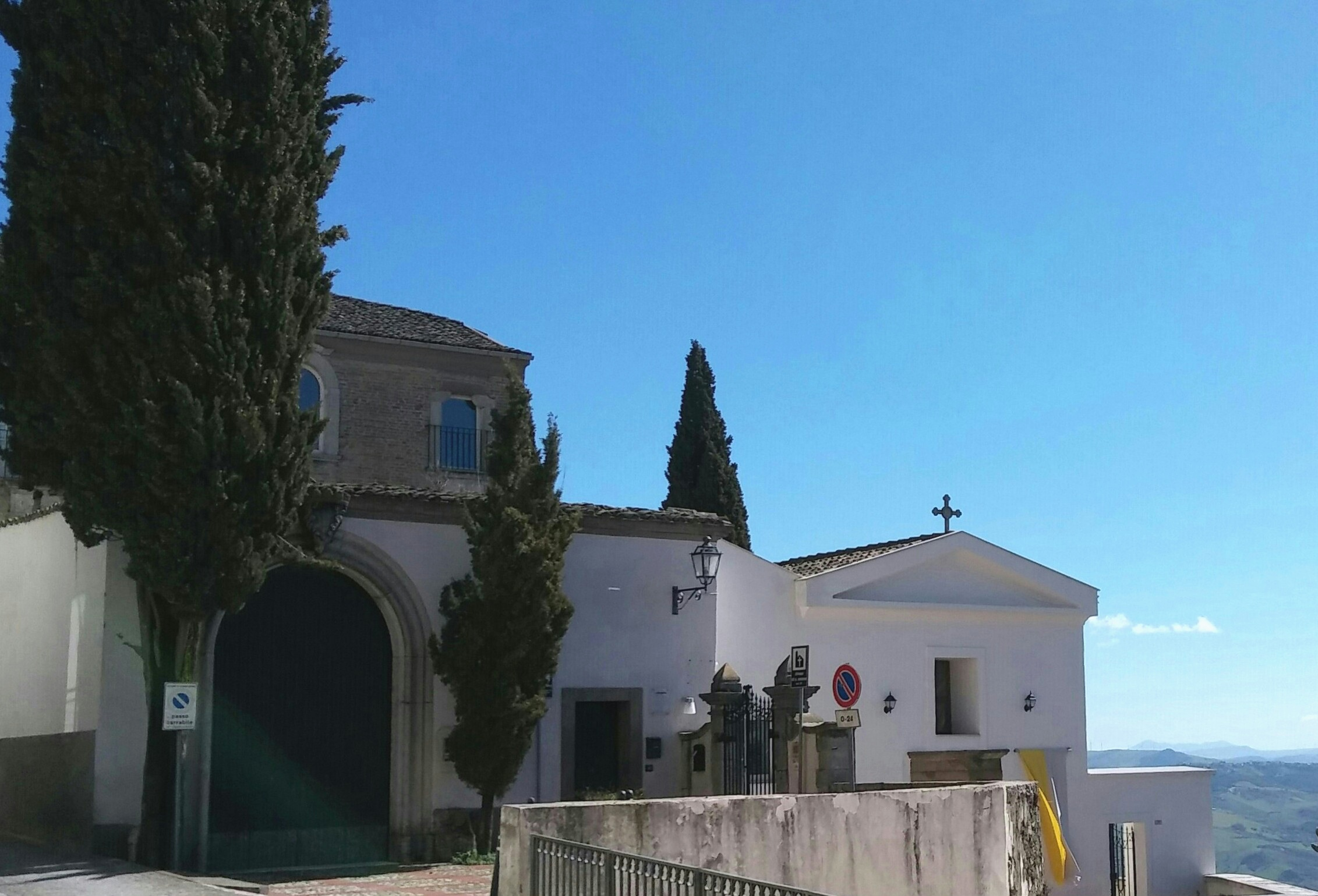
A glimpse of the Duchess’s Palace with the adjacent Sant’Andrea Church

Known as the Duchess’s Palace, it likely originated as a medieval tower house along Via Rodolfo d’Afflitto, renovated in the 16th century and expanded in the 18th.

Vitoli-Cozzo Palace

Adjacent to the municipal auditorium, it dates to the 18th century. Nearby stands the Sant’Antonio di Padova chapel, built in 1731.

Anzani-Renzulli Palace

Erected in the 17th century along Via Donato Anzani, this fortified structure incorporates a segment of the ancient city walls.

==== Fountains ====
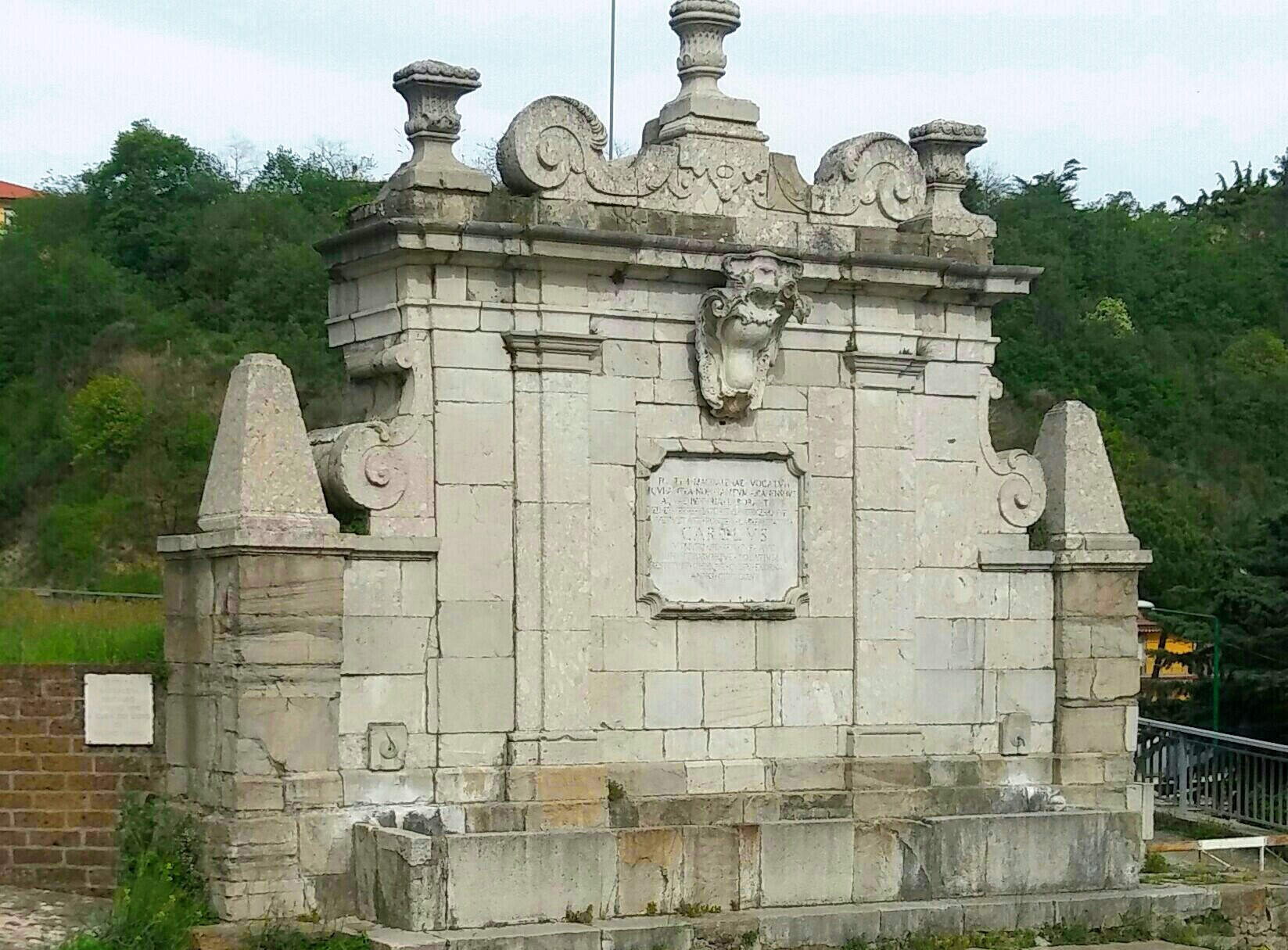
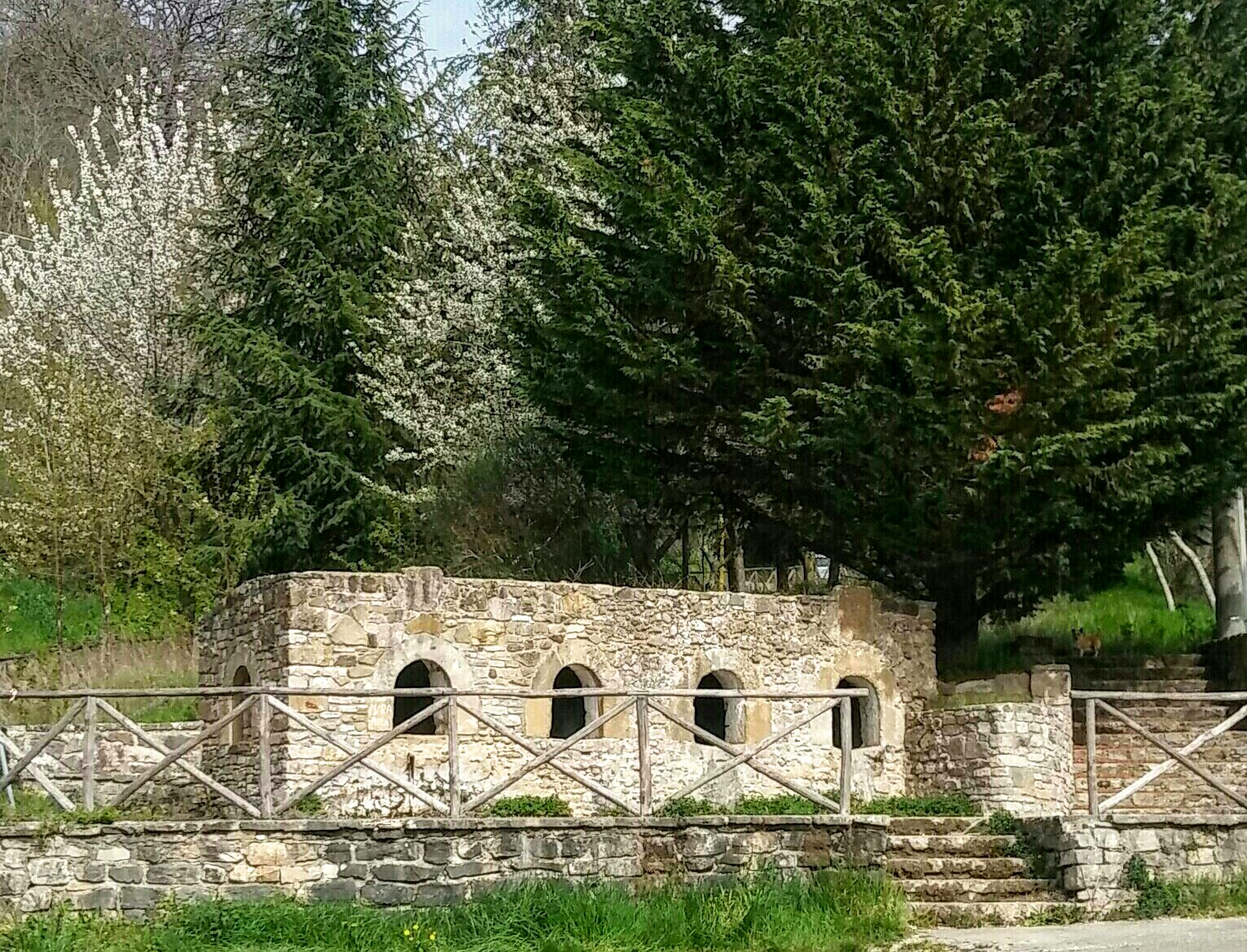
Comparison between the royal Maddalena fountain (top) and the rural Brecceto fountain (bottom)

The monumental royal fountains, constructed in 1608 for travelers along the Royal Road of the Puglie and later restored and embellished in 1757 by order of King Charles III of Spain, include four within the municipal territory: the Carpino della Pila (carpino means "trough" in Arianese dialect), the Maddalena Fountain, the Carpino della Tetta (near the older Tetta Fountain), and the Camporeale-Pontegonnella Fountain.

In stark contrast are the ancient rural fountains, often of rough stone, lower in height, and typically covered; a prime example is the 16th-century Brecceto Fountain, located along the road to the San Liberatore Sanctuary.

==== Farmhouses ====
These grand rural architectural structures were built during the Renaissance using local quarry stone or materials salvaged from the ruins of earlier medieval casalia. The most imposing farmhouses rise on the plateaus stretching across the northern rural area:

- Falceta, primarily for livestock, near the Camporeale-Foggia sheep track;
- Montefalco, along the same sheep track, at the foot of an ancient stone quarry;
- Chiuppo de Bruno, replacing the San Donato casale, whose chapel remains visible;
- La Sprinia, along the medieval Via Francigena leading to ports for the Holy Land;
- Sant’Eleuterio, built on the site of an eponymous casale, itself near the Roman vicus of Aequum Tuticum.

At the start of the third millennium, this area, already partially protected by the Salerno-Avellino superintendency for archaeology, was placed under permanent safeguard.

==== Taverns ====
Given its position along the Royal Road of the Puglie, the city once boasted numerous taverns. Those still identifiable, located along the route to Apulia, include the Turco Tavern, the Vitoli Tavern, and the Monache Tavern.

=== Parks and open spaces ===
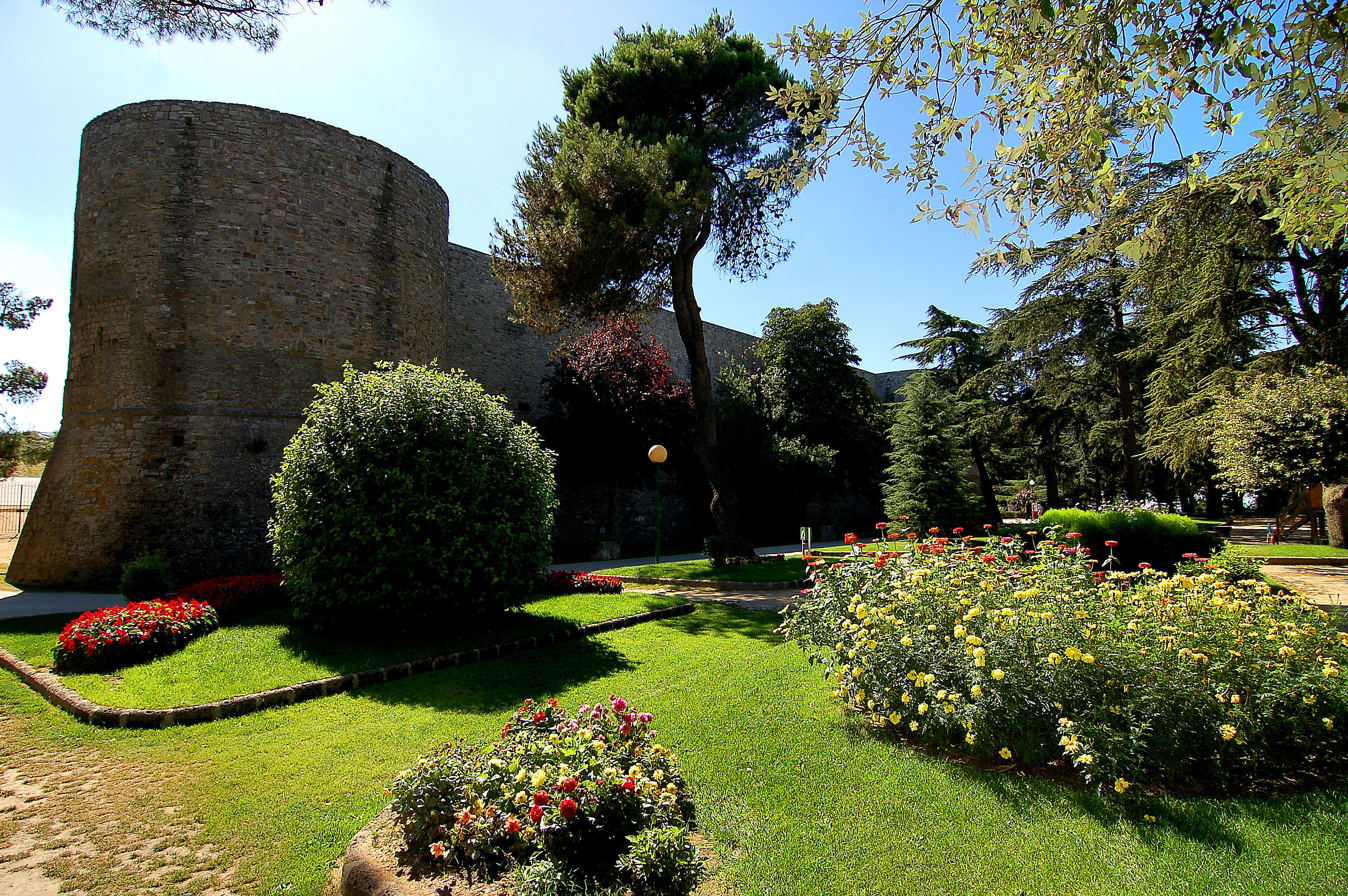
The municipal park and the castle garden

Municipal Park

Established in 1876 around the Norman Castle, this green space spans approximately 40,000 square metres (430,000 sq ft) at elevation, featuring lawns, flowers, hedges, and tall trees. Often snow-covered in winter, it is renowned for its panoramic views.

Pasteni Woods

A tall forest with mixed vegetation (conifers and broadleaf trees) on the northern slope of the historic center, equipped with picnic tables and a designated area for dogs.

Russo-Anzani Avenue

This path traces the perimeter of the ancient city walls, parts of which remain visible. Once home to the poet Girolamo Angeriano, the avenue stretches through an open, sunlit area facing east.

Tranesi Ridge

Bounded by raw stone walls along a westward-facing cliff, the ridge preserves remnants of the ancient Ariano ceramic kilns and offers a broad view centered on the "Sleeping Lady" of the Taburno, an Apennine ridge named for its feminine profile.

Calvario Belvedere

Spanning the eponymous hill beside the Palace of Justice, this terrace provides a deep vista reaching the distant Central Apennines. A church once stood here, destroyed by the 1962 Irpinia earthquake.

=== Historical-cultural routes ===
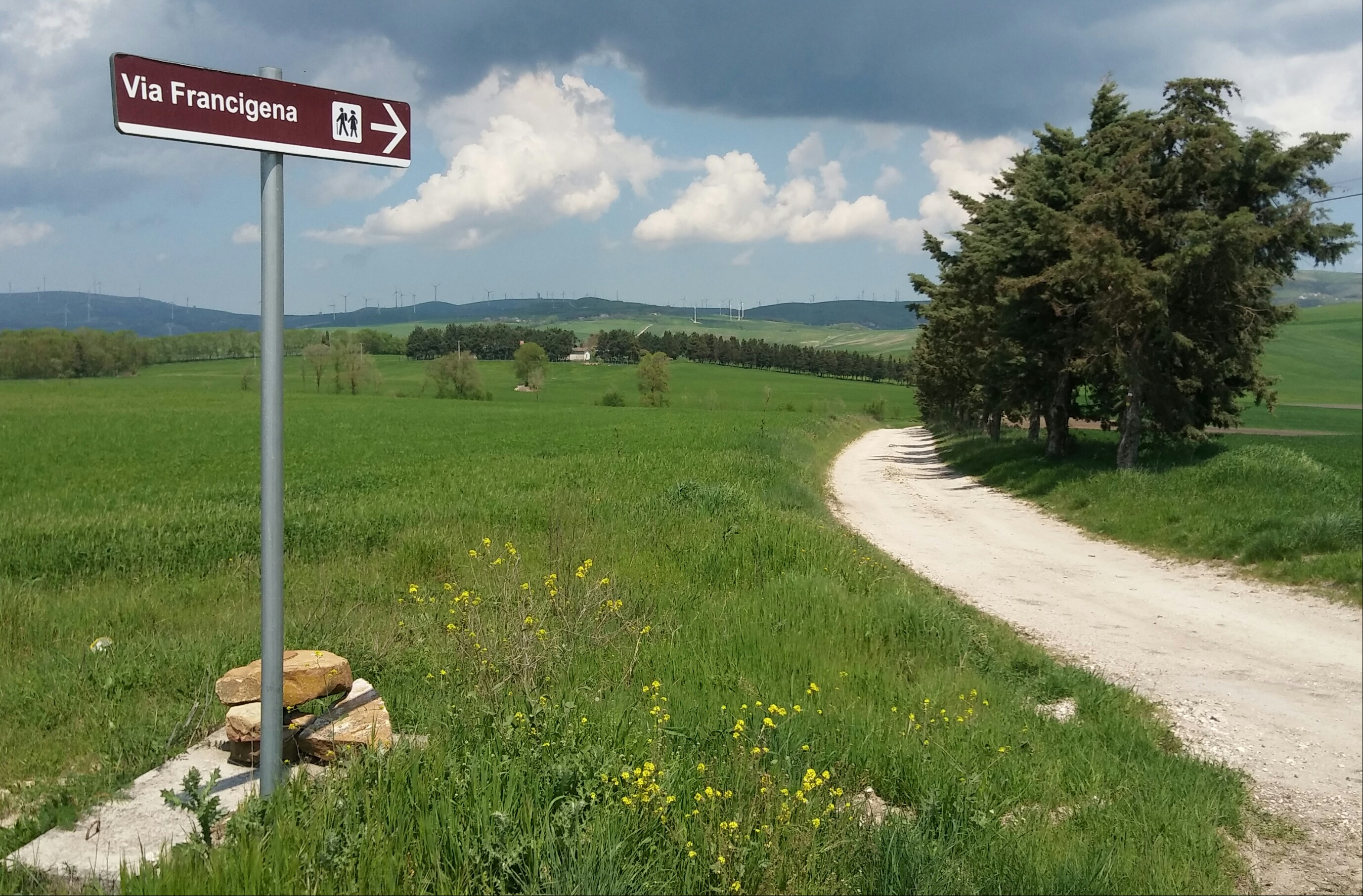
The Via Francigena toward Apulia on the La Sprinia plateau

Via Francigena

Used by the Lombards to reach the Sanctuary of Monte Sant'Angelo on the Gargano, it follows the ancient Via Traiana, which, unlike other Roman roads (such as the Via Appia, Via Aemilia, and Via Herculia), remained in use until modern times. Documented as the Via Francigena since 1024, it was trodden by throngs of European pilgrims and crusaders on their way to the Holy Land. The route crosses the Ariano countryside between the Miscano River (where scant remains of the Roman Malvizza bridge, known as the Devil’s Bridge in the Geographical Atlas of the Kingdom of Naples, emerge) and the Apennine watershed, beyond which stood the Crepacuore Castle, a stronghold of the Knights Hospitaller. Much of the path aligns with the EuroVelo 5 cycling route.

Royal Road of the Puglie

Conceived in the 16th century by King Philip II of Spain, it linked Naples (capital of the kingdom) to the provinces of Capitanata and Terra di Bari. While much of its route corresponds to the modern State Road 90 of the Puglie, the royal road skirted the historic center, passing the Madonna del Carmine and San Giovanni Battista churches; the latter stands at the Ariano Pass, the highest point of the entire road (renamed National Road after the unification). Various chapels, taverns and fountains can be seen along the way.

Tratturo Pescasseroli-Candela

This grassy track crosses the vast northeastern plains and is tied to the ancient transhumance of flocks from Abruzzo to Apulia, earning it the nickname “wool road.” A well preserved stretch of the track on the Camporeale plateau attracts hikers, cyclists, and horseback riders.

Tratturello Camporeale-Foggia

A branch of the sheep track from the Camporeale plateau heads first to the Three Fountains of Greci (where the first of a series of taverns stands), then crosses the Daunian Mountains into the Tavoliere delle Puglie to reach Foggia, home of the Royal customs of sheep herding in Apulia.

=== Archaeological sites ===
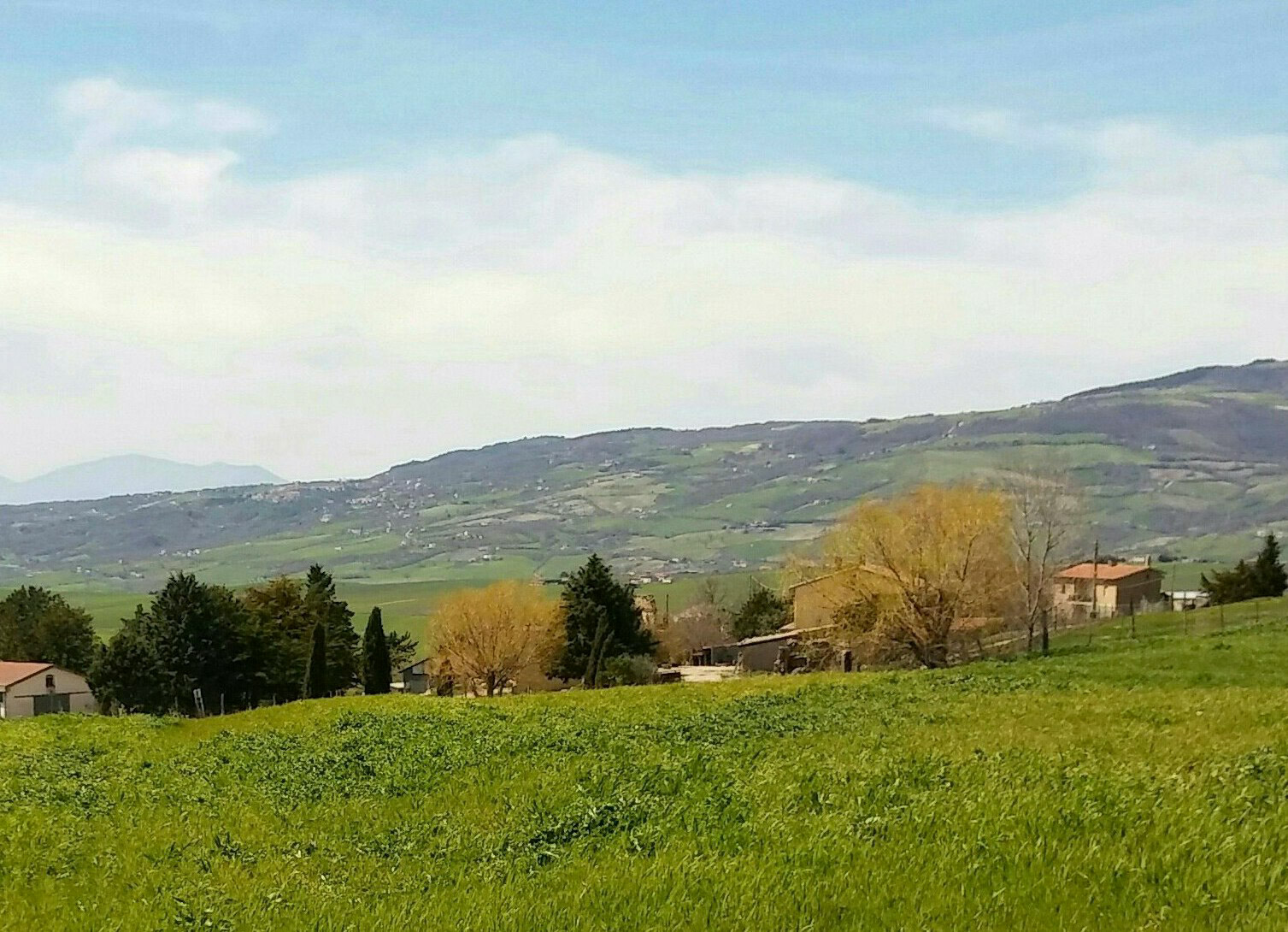
The Miscano Valley, rich in archaeological features. In the foreground, the Sant’Eleuterio district.

The municipal territory boasts two archaeological sites, both in the Miscano Valley, about 10 kilometres (6.2 mi) north of the town center. Most artifacts unearthed are displayed in the archaeological museum.

La Starza

Situated near a gypsiferous cliff, it is Campania’s oldest Neolithic prehistoric settlement. Layered remains attest to millennia of occupation, from the Lower Neolithic (6th millennium BC) to the Bronze Age (when the site was fortified), until its abandonment near the Iron Age (900 BC).

Aequum Tuticum

The ruins of this Roman vicus emerge from the broad Sant’Eleuterio plateau. Excavations reveal a settlement established by the 1st century BC, growing into a key road hub in the Imperial era, then gradually declining by the end of Late Antiquity.

== Society ==
=== Demographic evolution ===
Historical population

Year	Pop.	±%
1861	14,101	—
1871	14,480	+2.7%
1881	14,435	−0.3%
1901	17,653	+22.3%
1911	17,625	−0.2%
1921	21,378	+21.3%
1931	22,798	+6.6%
1936	24,357	+6.8%

Year	Pop.	±%
1951	27,613	+13.4%
1961	26,035	−5.7%
1971	22,661	−13.0%
1981	21,912	−3.3%
1991	23,040	+5.1%
2001	23,505	+2.0%
2011	22,517	−4.2%
2021	21,240	−5.7%

Source: ISTAT

=== Ethnicities and foreign minorities ===
The Italian National Institute of Statistics (ISTAT) reported, as of December 31, 2024, a resident foreign population of 461 individuals, accounting for 1.9% of the total population. Below is a list of the most represented nationalities:

1. Romania: 100
2. Ukraine: 53
3. Albania: 30
4. Morocco: 23

=== Languages and dialects ===
Within the municipal territory, alongside the Italian language, a distinctive variety of the Irpinian dialect is spoken.

=== Religion ===
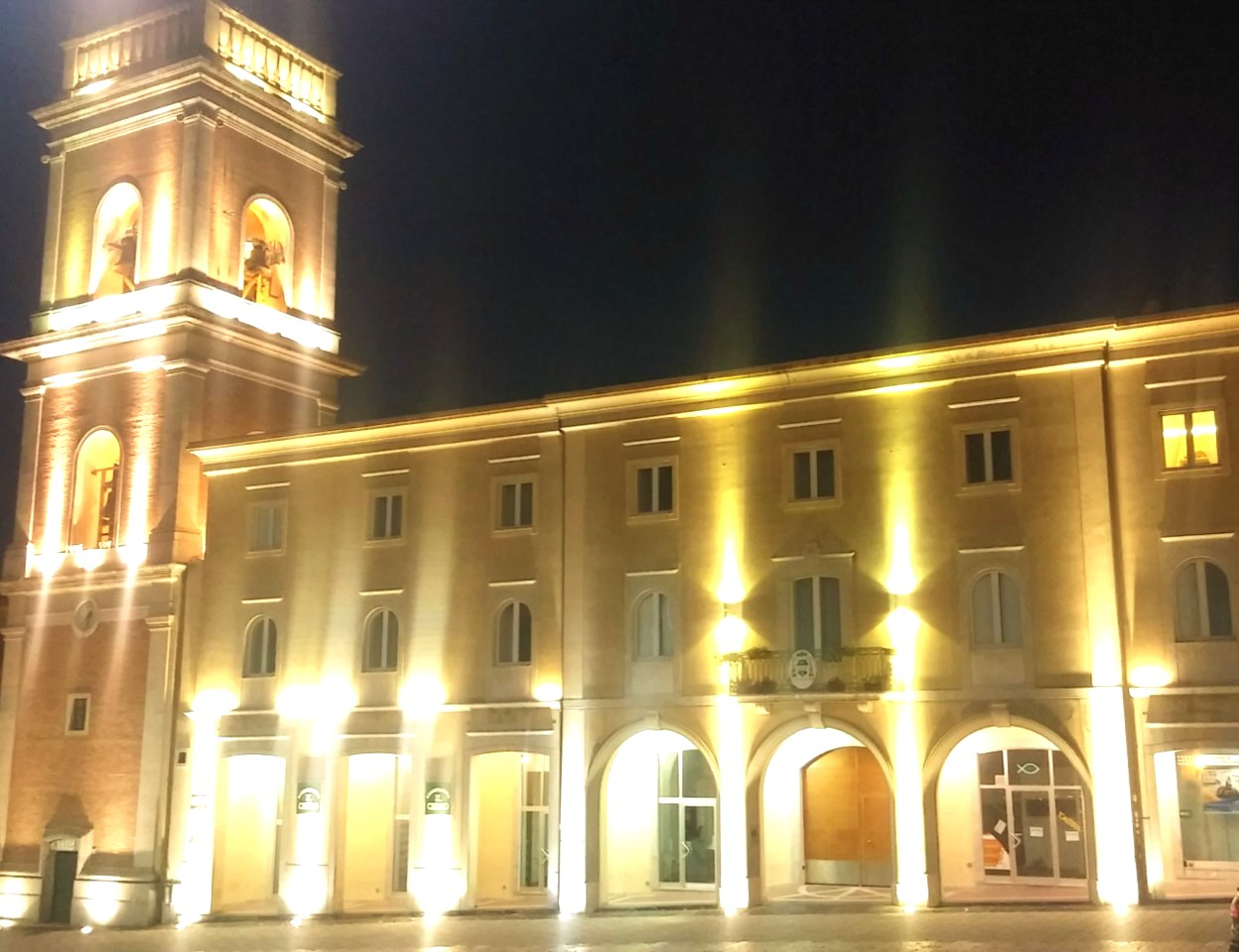
The episcopal palace, topped by the cathedral’s bell tower

The city serves as the seat of the Diocese of Ariano Irpino-Lacedonia, part of the Ecclesiastical Region of Campania. The municipal territory falls within the Deanery of Ariano.

=== Traditions and folklore ===
The Holy Thorns

A longstanding historical tradition recounts that in the latter half of the 13th century, King Charles I of Anjou gifted two holy thorns from the Crown of Christ to the survivors of the treacherous massacre perpetrated by the Saracens in 1255, as a tribute to the victims of that martyrdom. These relics are still preserved in the Museum of Silver. To commemorate these events, an annual historical reenactment of the gifting of the Holy Thorns takes place on August 11–13, integrated into the broader August program known as "Ariano Summer".

The Great Fairs

In 1567, following the devastating Italian Wars of the 16th century, the citizens submitted a petition to King Philip II of Spain requesting the establishment of several popular fairs. After numerous appeals, the request was eventually granted, though the number and dates of the fairs underwent changes over time. Between the 18th and 19th centuries, five fairs were held, coinciding with various religious observances (one of these, the patronal fair of Saint Ottone, had even more ancient origins and was granted special prerogatives). This schedule soon proved inadequate, particularly as the overlap with Holy Week in certain years prevented the patronal fair from taking place (leading to its eventual permanent cancellation). Consequently, during the 20th century, the number of annual fairs was increased to seven, scheduled for the following days: Palm Sunday, Divine Mercy Sunday, the second Sunday of May (Our Lady of Fátima), June 13 (Saint Anthony of Padua), July 16 (Our Lady of Mount Carmel), the last Sunday of July or first Sunday of August (Saint Mary of the Martyrs), and November 1 (All Saints’ Day), in addition to the traditional weekly market held on Wednesday, which had also been operational since the 16th century.

=== Institutions, entities, and associations ===
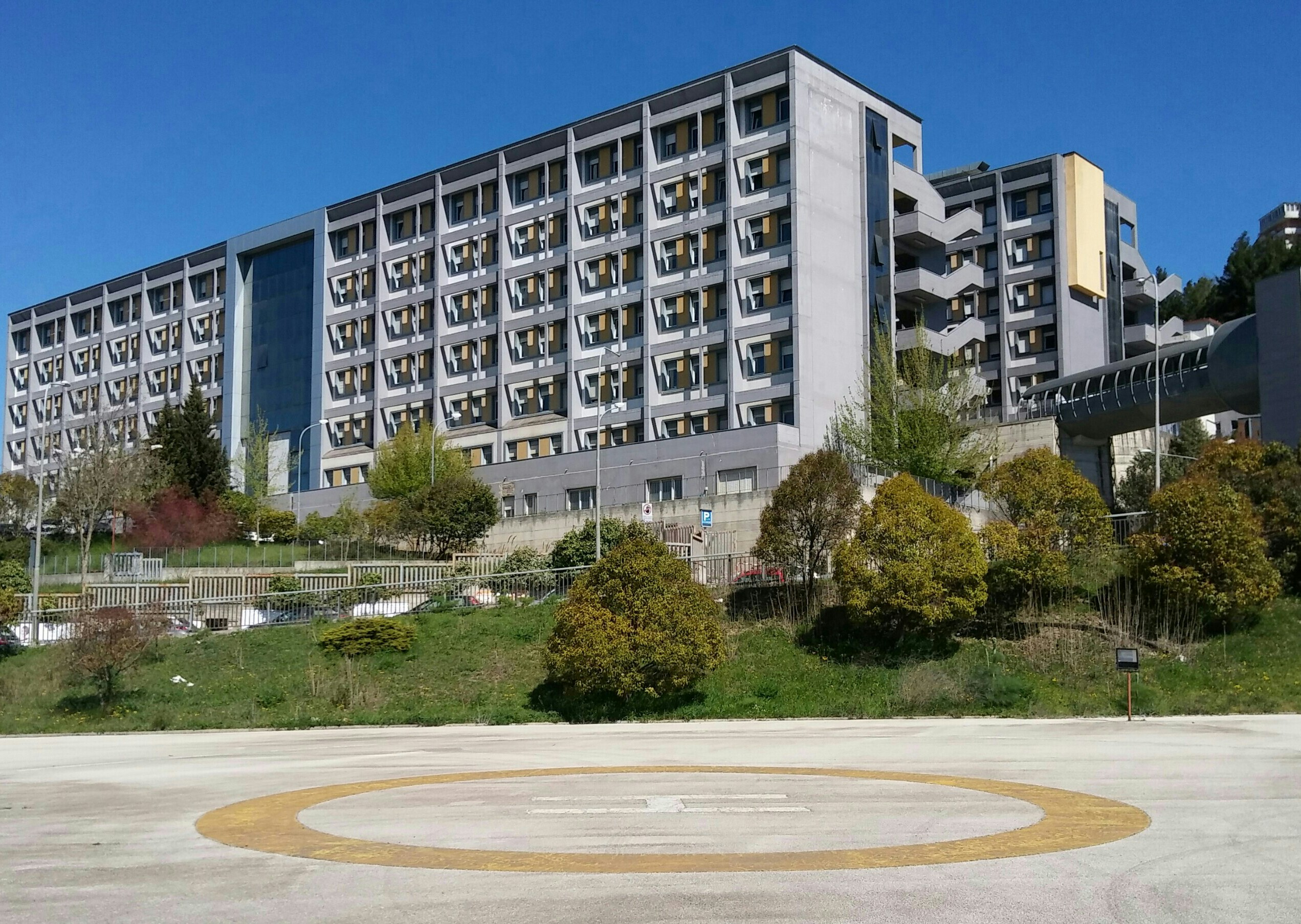
A partial view of the hospital area, with the helipad in the foreground

Sant’Ottone Frangipane Hospital

This civil hospital, established in 1410, originally served both the sick and pilgrims, as was typical of such institutions at the time. Relocated to an adjacent site in 1731, the hospital was entirely rebuilt in the 20th century slightly downhill, near the hermitage of the patron saint Ottone Frangipane.

Capezzuto Assistance Institute

Specializing in geriatric care, this facility was founded in 1873 with bequests collected by Francesco Capezzuto (Bishop of Ariano from 1838 to 1855), after whom it is named. Since 1891, it has occupied its current location in the historic center.

Mainieri Foundation

Established as an orphanage through the generosity of benefactor Vincenzo Mainieri (born in Ariano in 1853), this institution now focuses on training for individuals with disabilities. It has been recognized as a non-profit organization since 1950.

Minerva Center

Founded in 1982 in a green area on the outskirts of the city, this healthcare facility specializes in rehabilitation services.

Silent Workers of the Cross

This international association of the faithful has its motherhouse at the Valleluogo Sanctuary. Within the facility, there is a center for psychomotor rehabilitation.

Oblate Sisters of Saint Francis Xavier

This female religious institute was established in 1732 at the behest of the then-Bishop of Ariano, Filippo Tipaldi. The convent occupies the premises of the former hospital for pilgrims and the sick, which was relocated in December 1731. The sisters work in the field of education in Italy and, since 1996, in the Far East.

Sisters of the Holy Spirit

Founded in Ariano di Puglia in 1896 by the young Giuseppina Arcucci, this congregation is engaged in social assistance and, since 1986, missionary work abroad. Its motherhouse is located in the heart of the historic center, behind the town hall.

== Culture ==
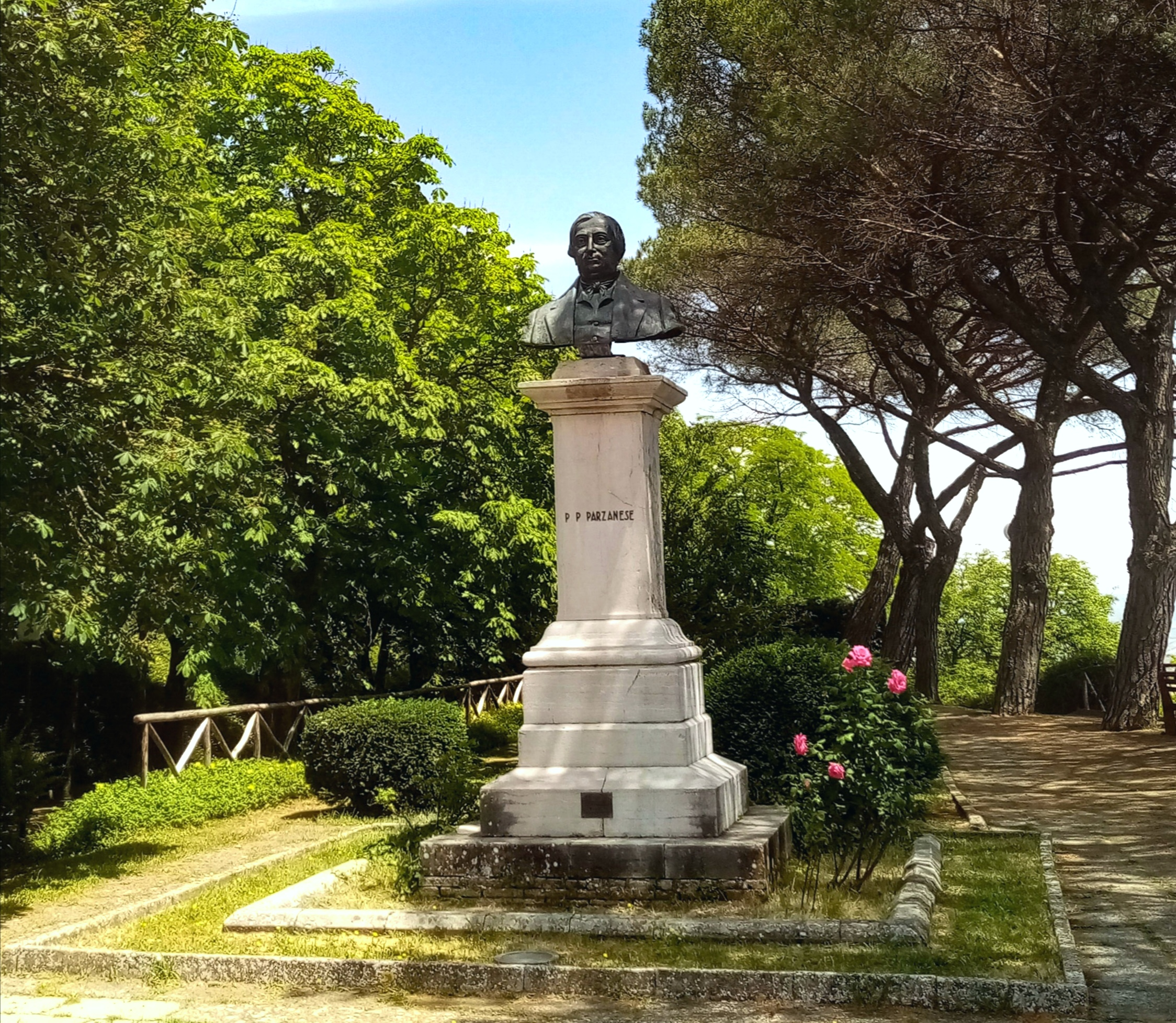
The bronze bust of the "village poet" Pietro Paolo Parzanese within the Municipal Park

=== Schools ===
As the seat of a school district, the municipal territory hosts twenty-four public educational institutions, five of which are reserved for secondary schools. These are organized under three major educational hubs: the classical-scientific high school "Pietro Paolo Parzanese", the secondary education institute "Ruggero II", and the secondary education institute "Giuseppe De Gruttola".

=== Universities ===
The city serves as an examination center for the Pegaso University, while the Sant’Ottone Frangipane Hospital hosts an educational hub of the Luigi Vanvitelli University. The inter-university campus Biogem further promotes advanced scientific and postgraduate training in biomedical, biochemical, and biolegal fields.

=== Research ===
Since 1991, Ariano Irpino has been home to the European Center for Norman Studies, founded by a group of French, English, and Italian scholars to conduct historical research on Norman civilization in medieval Europe.

Additionally, in 2006, the BioGeM (Biology and Molecular Genetics) research center was inaugurated in the presence of Nobel laureate Rita Levi-Montalcini, focusing on biogenetic and pharmacological studies.

=== Libraries ===
Civic Library

Located in the city center, it houses 60,000 volumes and pamphlets, including several thousand ancient holdings, alongside 20,000 multimedia documents. Its establishment owes much to the efforts of deputy Pasquale Stanislao Mancini, after whom it is named.

Diocesan Library

Situated within the episcopal palace, it contains 37,340 texts, in addition to the historical archive of the diocesan curia and the complete works of the priest-poet Pietro Paolo Parzanese.

Tipaldi Library

Established in 1731 by the then-Bishop Filippo Tipaldi, it is housed in the monastery of the Oblate Sisters of Saint Francis Xavier. It holds 15,480 volumes and pamphlets, including incunables and numerous early editions.

Biogem Library

Located within the Biogem research center, it comprises approximately 9,000 books and includes all publications by Treccani.

CESN Library

Housed at the European Center for Norman Studies, it contains about 4,000 historical texts, with a rare collection of 75 ancient books.

=== Art ===
The entire urban core is recognized as an arts town. Its oldest and most distinctive artistic production is the Ariano majolica, a type of glazed and decorated ceramic crafted according to varying styles and techniques across different eras.

=== Museums ===
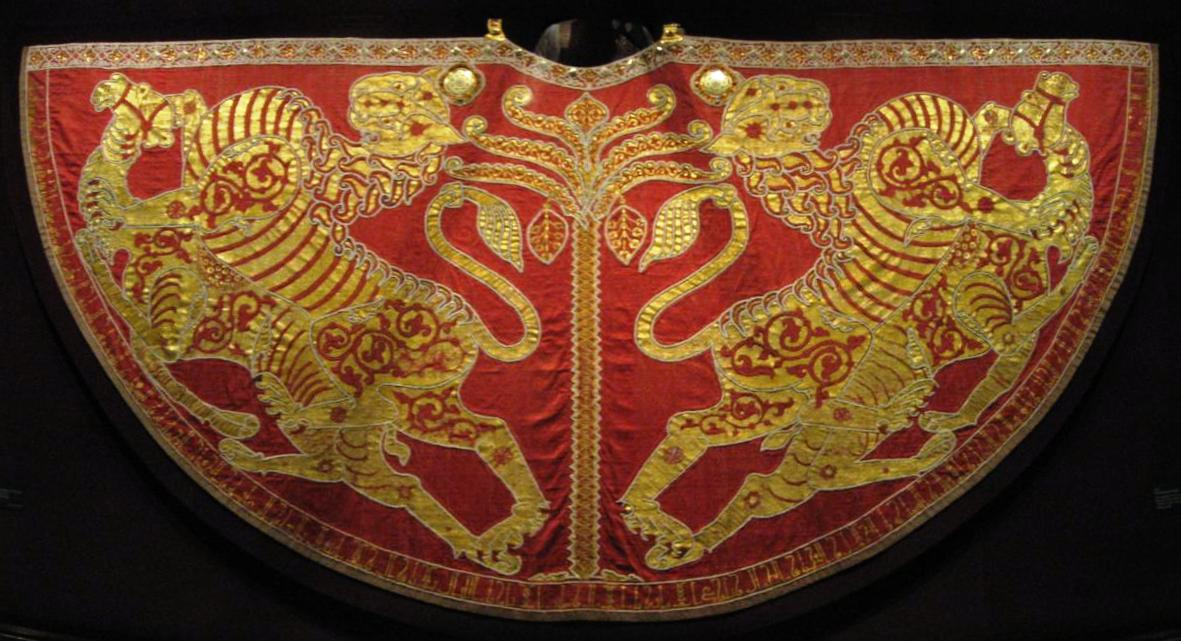
A reproduction of the coronation mantle of Roger II, the sovereign of the Assizes of Ariano, displayed in the Museum of Norman Civilization

Museum of Norman Civilization

Housed in the Bevere-Gambacorta Palace, within the former Church of San Francesco d’Assisi, it preserves historical artifacts, manuscripts, weapons, and coins from the High Middle Ages.

Archaeological Museum

Set up in a historic building along Via Donato Anzani, it contains artifacts from the Neolithic, Samnite, and Roman periods, excavated from archaeological sites in the Miscano Valley.

City Museum and Ceramics Gallery

Located along Via Rodolfo d’Afflitto, it showcases the civic photo archive, Renaissance-era prints, and an extensive collection of local antique majolica.

Museum of Silver

Situated in the former treasury of the Ariano Cathedral, it safeguards numerous artistic treasures, including a reliquary containing two holy thorns from the Crown of Christ.

Diocesan Museum

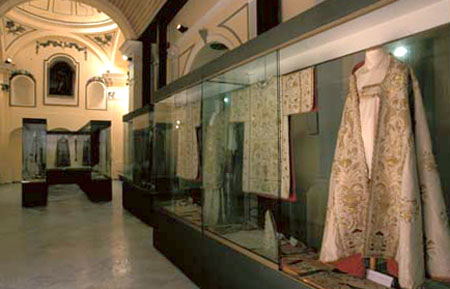
Liturgical vestments in the Diocesan Museum

Located in the former Church of Santa Lucia, it displays paintings from the Neapolitan school of the 17th and 18th centuries, alongside various textile, wooden, and marble works.

Giuseppina Arcucci Museum

Maintained by the Sisters of the Holy Spirit, it is dedicated to the congregation’s founder but also preserves works and documents from earlier periods.

Biogeo

Established within the Biogem research center with support from the National Institute of Geophysics and Volcanology, this museum illustrates the origin and evolution of the Earth and life.

=== Media ===
Canale 58 is the local television broadcaster, founded in 1994; since 2013, it has maintained its own website. It broadcasts on channel 85 of the digital terrestrial network.

=== Music ===
A polyphonic choir is active in the Ariano Cathedral. The main concert series in the city are ClassicAriano (organized by the Italian Chamber Music Society) and BiogemMusica, the latter established directly by the Biogem research center.

=== Cuisine ===
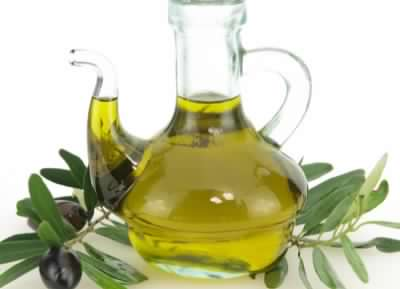
The extra virgin olive oil Irpinia - Colline dell’Ufita, a product deeply tied to the territory

The local cuisine faithfully reflects the agricultural and pastoral traditions, so much so that many of the dishes retain their characteristic vernacular names.

In addition to the renowned homemade bread baked in wood-fired ovens in various shapes, certain pasta cuts, dairy products, and sausages are peculiar to this area with its strong agricultural and livestock tradition. Among meats, white poultry from farmyard animals predominates, often stuffed and flavored with local wild herbs. Despite the relative distance from the Tyrrhenian and Adriatic seas (both less than 100 km (62 mi) away), there are also seafood dishes, such as the typical anchovy pizza.

Vegetables constitute a significant portion of local ingredients; as early as the 19th century, for instance, the production of "an immense quantity of peppers, called pipilli" (a term still used in the Arianese dialect) was noted. Legumes and vegetables (including the Christmas cardone) are also widely utilized, their preparation requiring a specific type of sealed terracotta pot known as the pignata.

Fruit is highly distinctive, with some cultivars, particularly cherries, being native to the area. Foraging for undergrowth products is traditional in intermediate seasons: in spring, the so-called spàlici (Asparagus acutifolius, a smaller but more aromatic variety of asparagus than the cultivated type) are gathered, while in autumn, the prized cardariélli (Pleurotus eryngii) are sought.

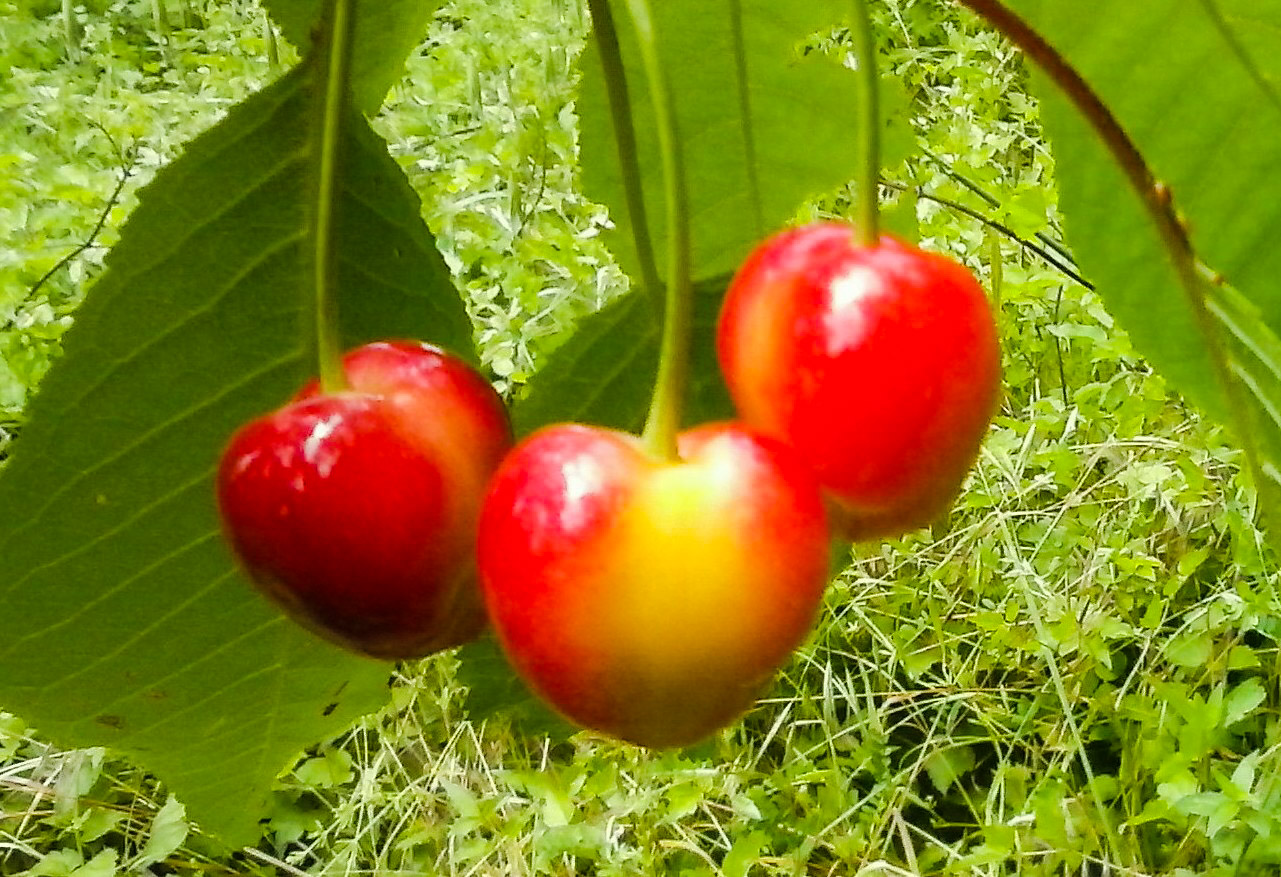
"Lady’s Cherries," a typical local variety with heart-shaped, colorful fruits

Some of the more elaborate dishes are exclusive to certain occasions: strùffoli at Carnival, casatiélli and pizzpanàro at Easter, pipilli chjini and zéppule on Christmas Eve, malàti during the grape harvest, and pizza cu li ccécule at the pig slaughter.

The essential seasoning for all dishes is the DOP extra virgin olive oil Irpinia - Colline dell’Ufita, derived from the native Ravece cultivar. The PAT designation is awarded to the caciocchiato, a dessert cheese produced exclusively in the region. The winemaking tradition is also noteworthy, thanks to several indigenous grape varieties.

=== Events ===
The Ariano International Film Festival is a film competition that takes place every year between July and August.

The Ariano Folk Festival is a showcase of ethno-folk music that takes place in the second half of August.

The Two Cultures is a September meeting organized by the Biogem research center, attended by distinguished scholars and Nobel laureates.

== Anthropic geography ==
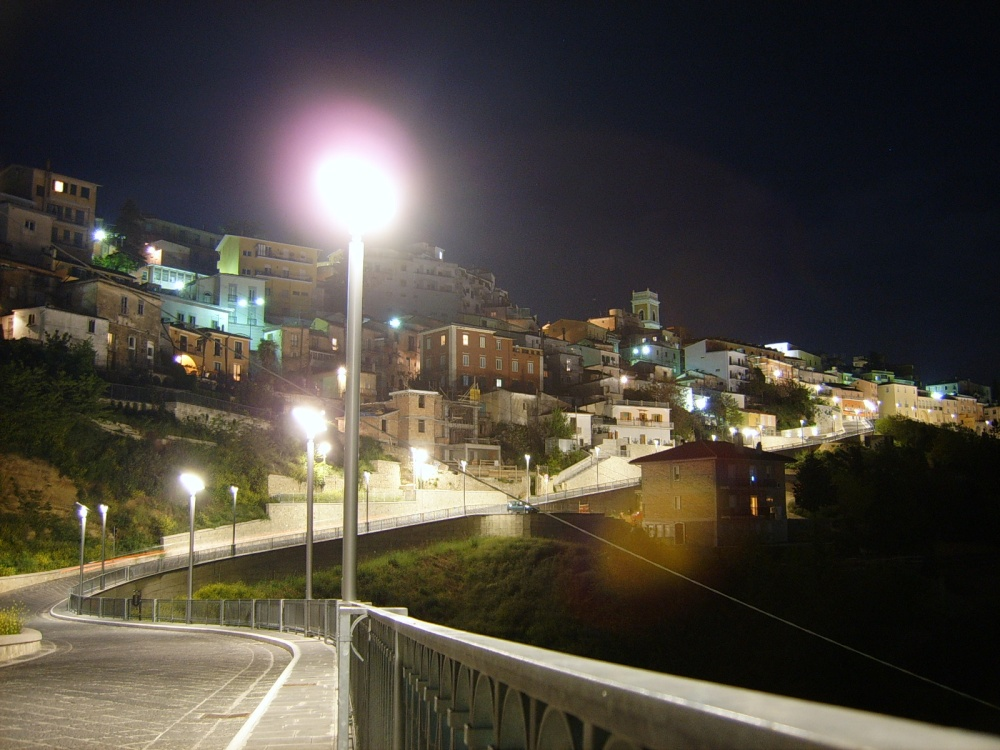
Russo-Anzani Avenue, along the ramparts of the ancient walls

=== Urban planning ===
The historic center, perched on the ridge of the Tricolle and dating back to the High Middle Ages, has always had a rather elongated layout. It originally developed along the old road, a simple military mule track that stretched from Puglia (then fiercely contested with the Byzantines) to the Duchy of Benevento, a possession of the Lombards. This route is clearly identifiable in the districts of Guardia, Piazza Ferrara, and Strada. Since the 9th century, the urban perimeter was equipped with gates and surrounded by walls, parts of which today lie under the modern Russo-Anzani Avenue. The imposing Ariano Castle stood apart from the rest of the settlement, surrounded instead by expanses of public pastures. In the Tabula Rogeriana of 1154, the city—designated in Arabic as ʼAryānah (mistakenly transcribed as ʼArnānah)—was positioned along an itinerary linking Ordona (or possibly Troia) to Apice, continuing onward to Benevento, Avellino, and Salerno.

From the late 13th century, various urban or extramural neighborhoods began to emerge along ancient branches of the old road: examples include Santo Stefano and Sambuco (along a lane to Pulcarino-Zungoli), as well as San Nicola and San Giovanni Valle (along dual paths to Montecalvo). Temporary, often rock-hewn settlements were not uncommon, some retaining the ethnonym of their earliest inhabitants (such as the Tranesi ridge, populated by refugees from Trani). The numerous caves both within and beyond the walls, though ancient, are artificial in origin; initially serving as shelters or escape routes, they were later repurposed as workshops or cellars. The many ravines encircling the historic center did not exist originally but formed due to severe erosive processes (and subsequent landslides) triggered by the misguided channeling of rainwater down the steep slopes, leading to the ruin of several districts.

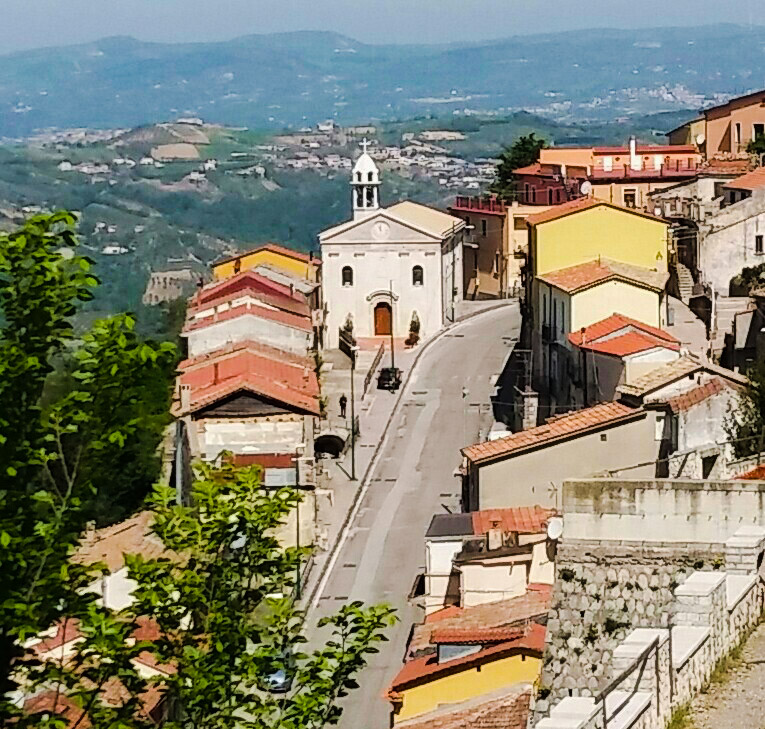
The Church of the Madonna del Carmine in the 17th-century San Rocco district

The urban layout underwent significant transformation between the 17th and 18th centuries with the completion of the so-called new road, namely the Royal Road of the Puglie (later renamed the National Road of the Puglie). This major artery, for spatial reasons, merely skirted the ancient core and its weathered walls. During this period, shopkeepers and tavern owners abandoned their old dwellings (devastated by a series of earthquakes between 1688 and 1732) and relocated en masse along the new road, establishing the districts of San Rocco, San Domenico, Ariella, and Pagliare.

Another major urban overhaul occurred in the 20th century, spurred not only by the damage from World War II but also by a new wave of earthquakes between 1930 and 1980. This led to the expansion of the historic center at the expense of the original public pastures (districts such as Calvario, San Leonardo, Pàsteni-Fontananuova, and Pallottini-Piano della Croce) and the construction of new peripheral neighborhoods (Cardito, San Pietro, Sant’Antonio, and Martiri) built mid-slope along the modern variant of the State Road 90 of the Puglie. The entire settlement, interspersed with slopes and green spaces, has thus taken on a conical-helical shape, with the historic center remaining its apex. Indeed, the municipal urban plan and related building regulations (in effect since 2010) establish guidelines to protect the old city, while much of the rural area is safeguarded as a rural landscape.

=== Hamlets ===
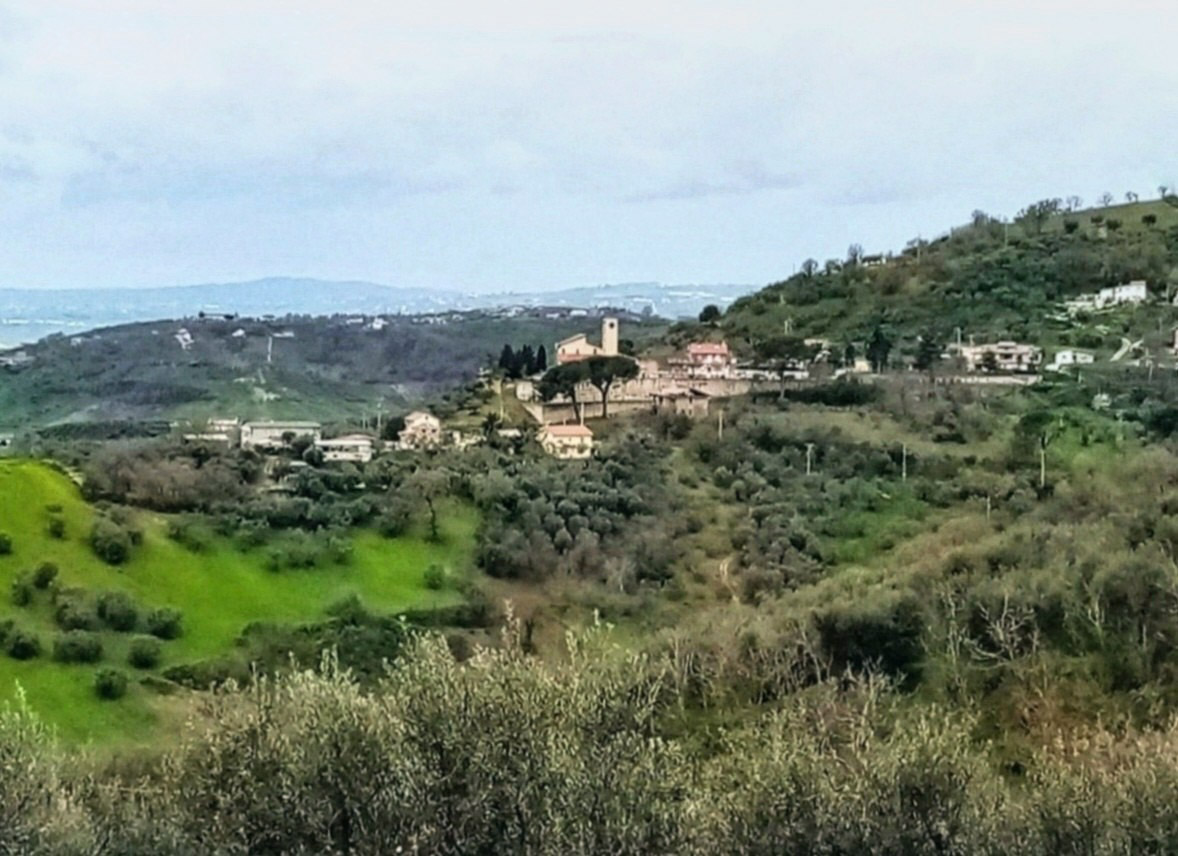
A typical rural landscape with hills and olive groves. In the center, the San Liberatore Sanctuary in the eponymous hamlet.

A significant portion of the city’s community resides in rural areas, traditionally referred to as hamlets. Already inhabited during the Late Middle Ages (as inferred from the numerous rural churches documented since the 14th century), these hamlets faced harsh conditions for centuries due to widespread unhealthiness and insecurity. From the Renaissance onward, several new farmhouses emerged, but significant rural building development occurred only in modern times, after malaria and brigandage were finally eradicated; until the 19th century, the vast majority of the population lived in the historic center.

The hamlets typically retain their traditional names in the Arianese dialect, often with toponymic references not only to the natural environment but also to feudalism and religion. Analysis of topographic maps reveals that, with the exception of a village that emerged in the 19th century near the railway station, valley areas are generally avoided for residential settlement. Indeed, many hamlets are situated on hilly terrain near springs, at elevations ranging from 200 to 800 m (2,600 ft) above sea level.

== Economy ==
=== Agriculture ===
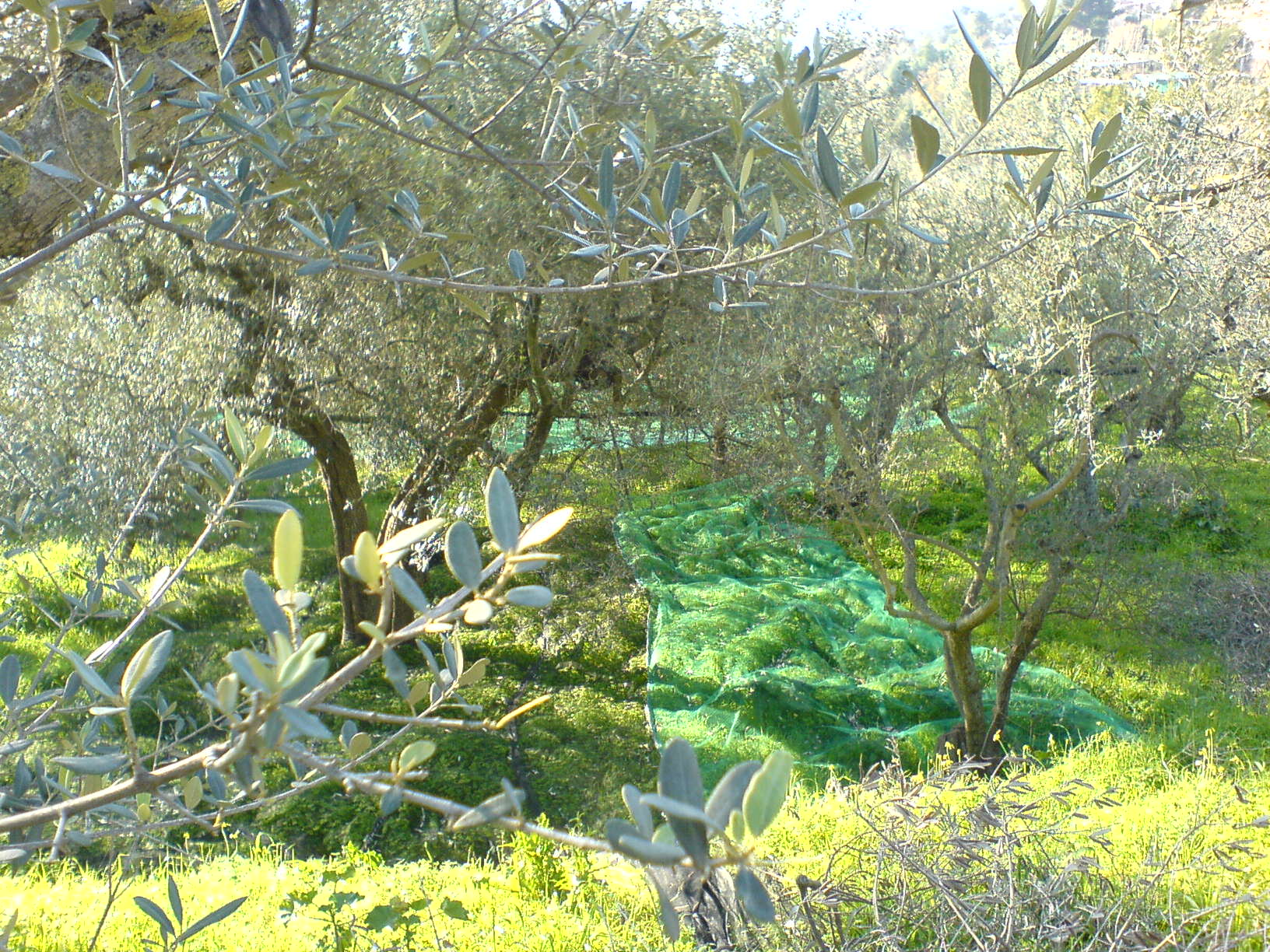
An olive grove in autumn, with nets spread on the ground for harvesting

The significance of the agro-zootechnical sector is well-documented by the vastness of the municipal countryside (the largest in Campania) and the prevalence of scattered rural settlements. The city, included in agricultural region no. 1 "Upper Cervaro" and affiliated with the National Association of Olive Oil Cities, boasts the highest number of agricultural businesses and the largest utilized agricultural area in the entire province. The spread of organic farming is also notable: the Irpinia biodistrict, based within the city, is included in the national register of organic districts.

Olive cultivation, in particular, has deep historical roots: an "olivetum in Ariano" is mentioned in a donation deed dated 797, as recorded in the Chronicon casinense. The olives of the native Ravece cultivar, used to produce DOP extra virgin olive oil "Irpinia - Colline dell’Ufita", are especially renowned. Other local specialties include historic grape varieties, cereals (for bread and flour production), fruits, legumes, meats, and dairy products. Among the latter, the caciocchiato, a uniquely local product, bears the PAT designation.

=== Crafts ===
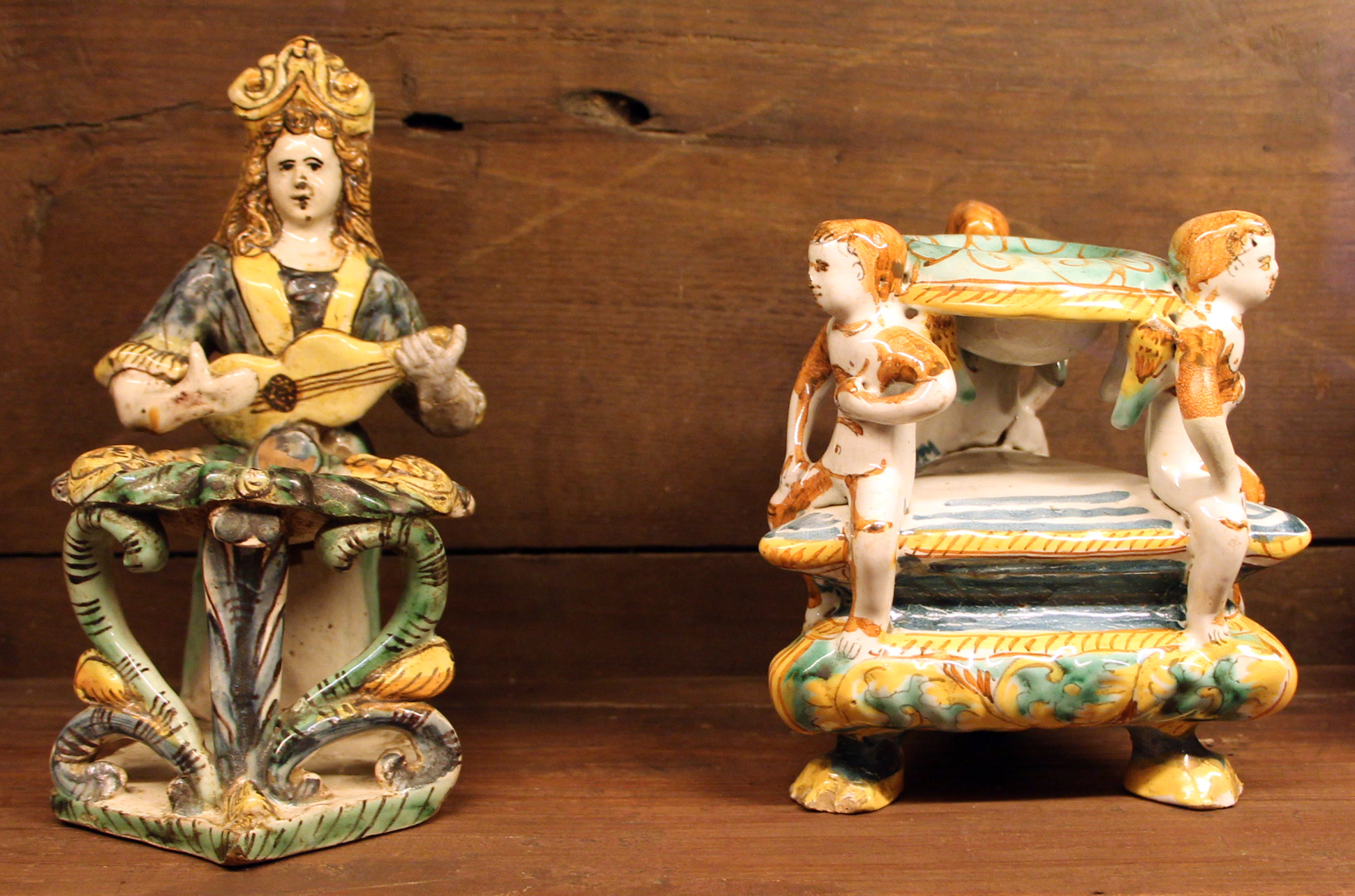
Antique Ariano ceramics

Ariano ceramics is the most characteristic handicraft of the city, with evidence dating back to the Middle Ages. Kilns were initially located near the Norman Castle, later moving to the caves of the extramural Tranesi district, so named because it was populated in the 15th century by refugees from Trani.

Extensive collections of decorated antique ceramics (i.e., majolica) are housed in the City Museum and Ceramics Gallery, but the artisanal tradition persists into the modern era, earning the CAT (Traditional Artistic Ceramics) designation from the National Ceramic Council. The municipality, recognized as a center of established ceramic tradition by the Ministry for Business and Made in Italy, is a full member of the Italian Association of Ceramic Cities.

=== Industry ===
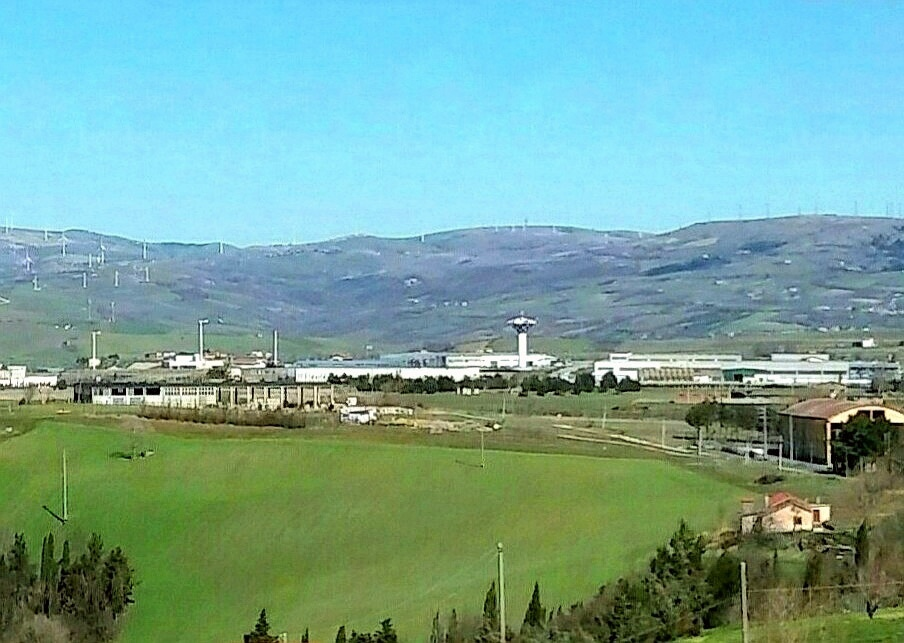
Industrial facilities on the Camporeale plateau

The industrial sector, a successor to the city’s ancient local manufactories (milling, plasterwork, workshop crafts, and wool production), comprises a significant number of small to medium-sized enterprises, primarily active in the agro-food, construction, metalworking, and clothing industries. Many of these businesses, along with the Biogem biotechnology consortium, are located in a designated 100-hectare industrial zone on the Camporeale plateau, strategically positioned between Campania and Puglia.

The production of renewable energy through the development of wind farms and photovoltaic installations is also experiencing strong growth, aligned with the vision of sustainable development.

=== Tourism ===
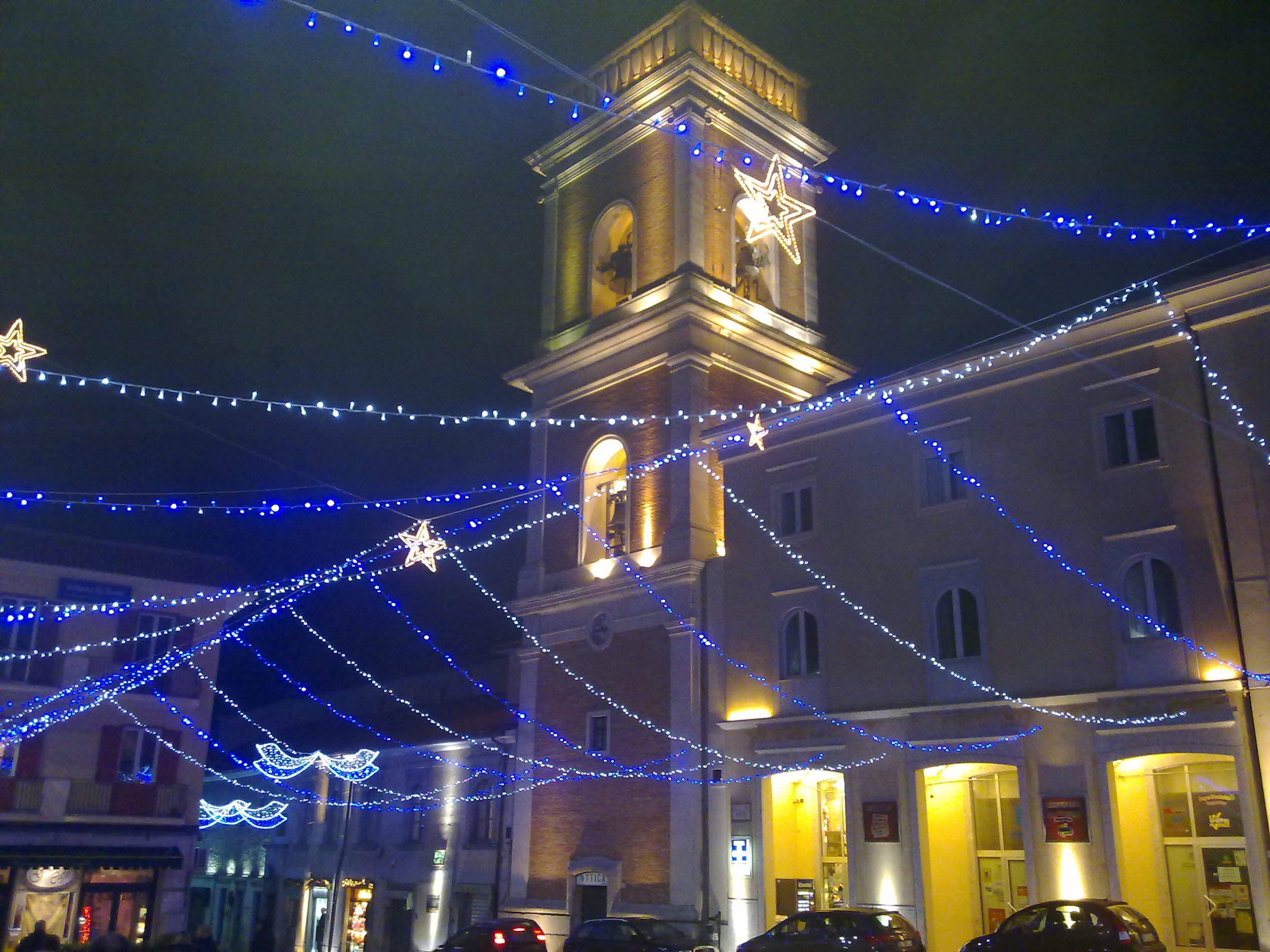
Piazza Plebiscito, the heart of the historic center

According to the ISTAT classification, the territory has a "mountainous and cultural, historical, artistic, and landscape" tradition, with a medium level of tourist density.

The city boasts a long tradition of hospitality: situated at the Ariano Saddle (the most significant pass between Campania and Puglia), it has historically relied on heavy traffic from travelers and wayfarers, catered to by a large number of merchants and tavern keepers. However, the opening of the Naples-Foggia railway in the latter half of the 19th century (followed by the A16 motorway a century later) led to a notable decline in interregional traffic along the old National Road of the Puglie.

Nevertheless, the favorable climatic and environmental characteristics of the area began attracting visitors as early as the Fascist era, when a summer camp was established. By the second half of the 20th century, the town had become a popular vacation destination. Since the Great Jubilee, there has been significant growth in religious and historical-cultural tourism, leading the municipality to join the Viaticus tourist district and the European Association of the Via Francigena.

The gastronomic sector is also renowned, with a wide range of accommodations, which together number more than thirty (hotels, inns, agritourism farms, holiday homes and bed and breakfasts).

== Infrastructure and transport ==
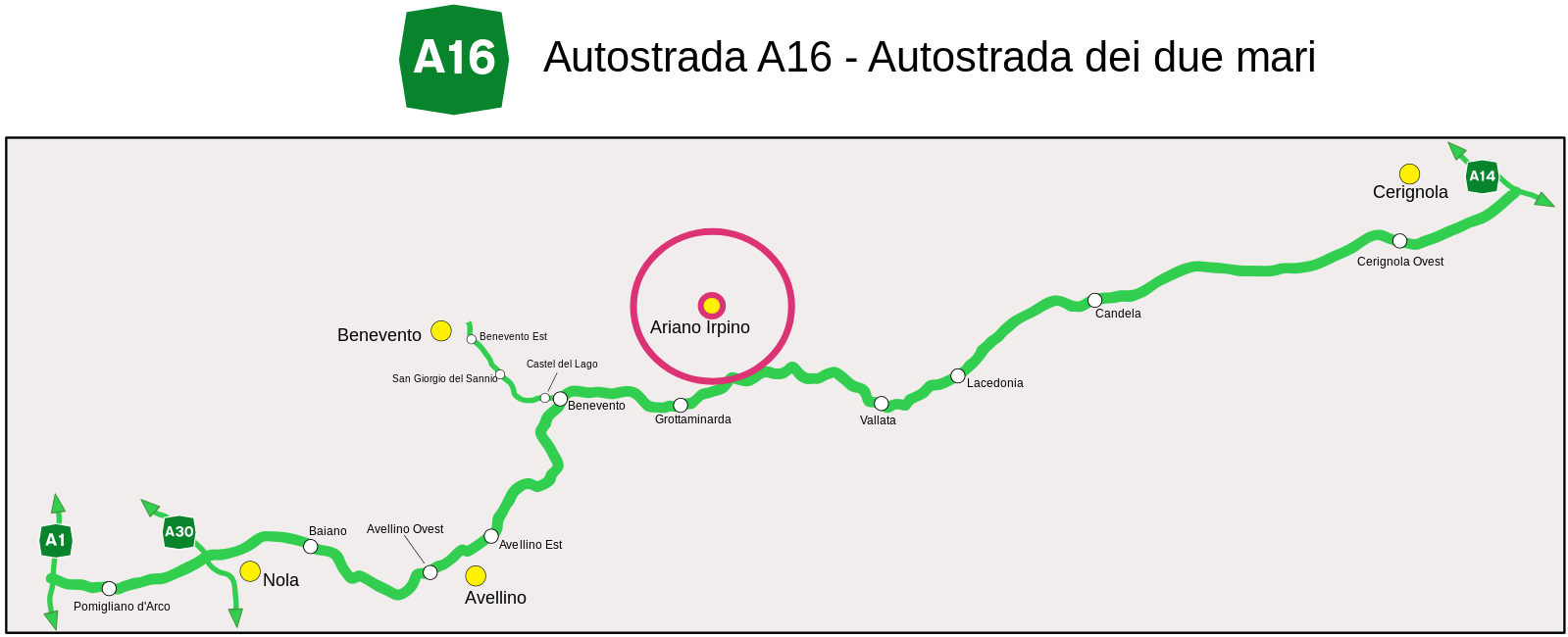
The city, midway between the Tyrrhenian and Adriatic seas, adjacent to the A16 Naples-Canosa

=== Roads ===
The backbone of the city’s road network is the State Road 90 of the Puglie, which, together with its variants 90 bis and 90 dir, traverses the entire municipal territory, facilitating interregional connections between Campania and Puglia through complementary or alternative routes to the A16 motorway.

The provincial roads are fairly numerous, forming a wide-meshed network that connects to neighboring settlements. The web of municipal roads, meanwhile, is dense and intricately structured.

=== Railways ===
The Ariano Irpino railway station, located along the Benevento-Foggia section of the Rome-Bari line, lies in a small valley about 5 km from the urban center. Additionally, at the line’s summit is the technical stop of Pianerottolo d’Ariano.

Under the modern high-capacity project, a new railway infrastructure is under construction in the expansive Ufita Valley, strategically positioned relative to the broader district.

=== Urban transportation ===
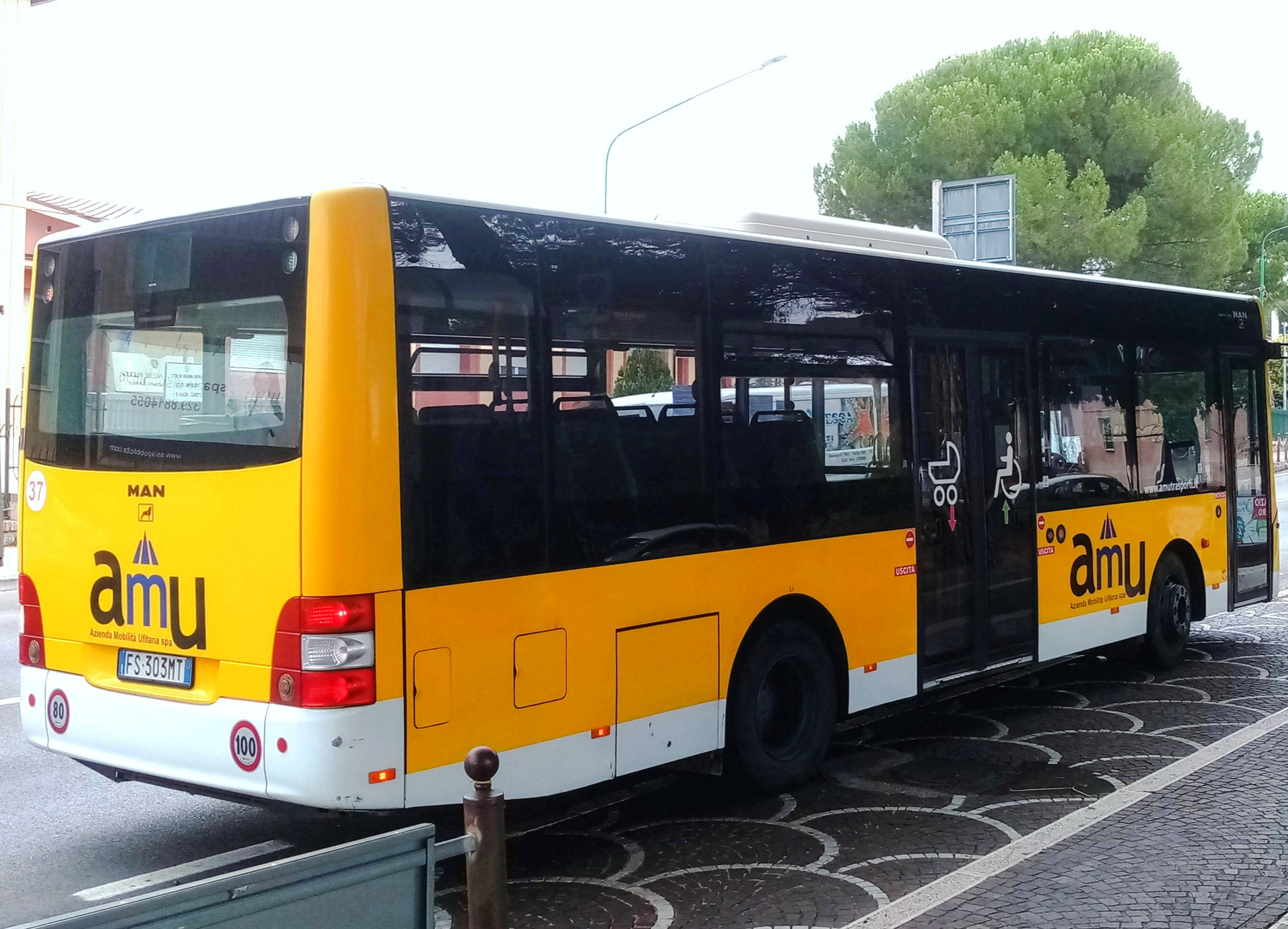
Public transport bus

The management of multi-storey and local parking facilities, as well as the urban public transport service (extending to rural areas), is fully overseen by the municipal company AMU.

The regionally affiliated company AIR ensures interurban connections within Campania, with extensions to Lazio, Molise, and Puglia.

Shuttle services to nearby Puglia centers are also provided by bus lines under the COTRAP consortium.

== Administration ==
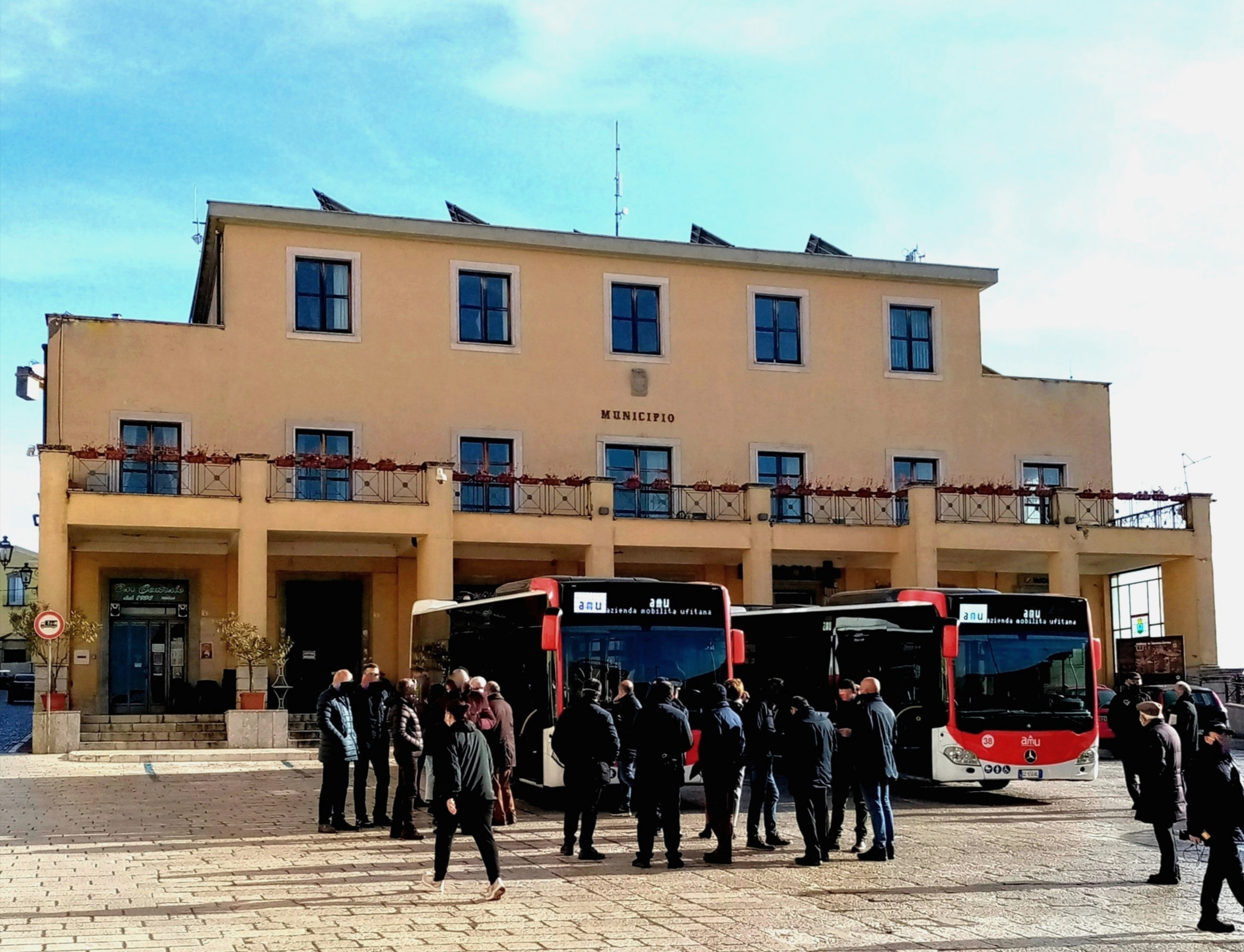
The town hall

Documented since the 13th century, the universitas (municipality) of Ariano was initially part of the justiciarship of the Principality and Land of Benevento and later the Principato Ultra. Historically elected on a parish basis and led by a mayor assisted by a council, the universitas was originally subject to the feudal regime of the County of Ariano. From 1585 onward, it came under the direct authority of the Crown of Naples; however, the role of government official was not held by the mayor but by a governor, appointed initially by the count (or duke) of Ariano and later by the Viceroy of Naples or the sovereign himself. Special privileges were reserved for the noble class, convened in two seats at Piazza Ferrara (near Sant’Agostino) and Piazza Grande (opposite the Cathedral). During the Napoleonic era—and again in the Fascist era—the mayor’s duties were temporarily assumed by a government-appointed podestà, while the governor’s role and noble privileges were abolished. The modern City Hall dates to the post-World War II period; however, according to the current statute, the seat of the municipality must remain in the historical center.

=== Additional administrative information ===
The municipality, included in the alert zone "Upper Irpinia-Sannio", maintains its own civil protection unit, coordinated by the mayor.

As a center for territorial area A1 (comprising 29 neighboring municipalities), the city serves as the district headquarters for the health district, school district, revenue agency, INPS agency, detention center, employment center, Ufita Mountain Community, civil engineering office, and justice of the peace. Although part of the Province of Avellino, it falls (along with surrounding municipalities) under the jurisdiction of the Tribunal of Benevento.

== Sport ==
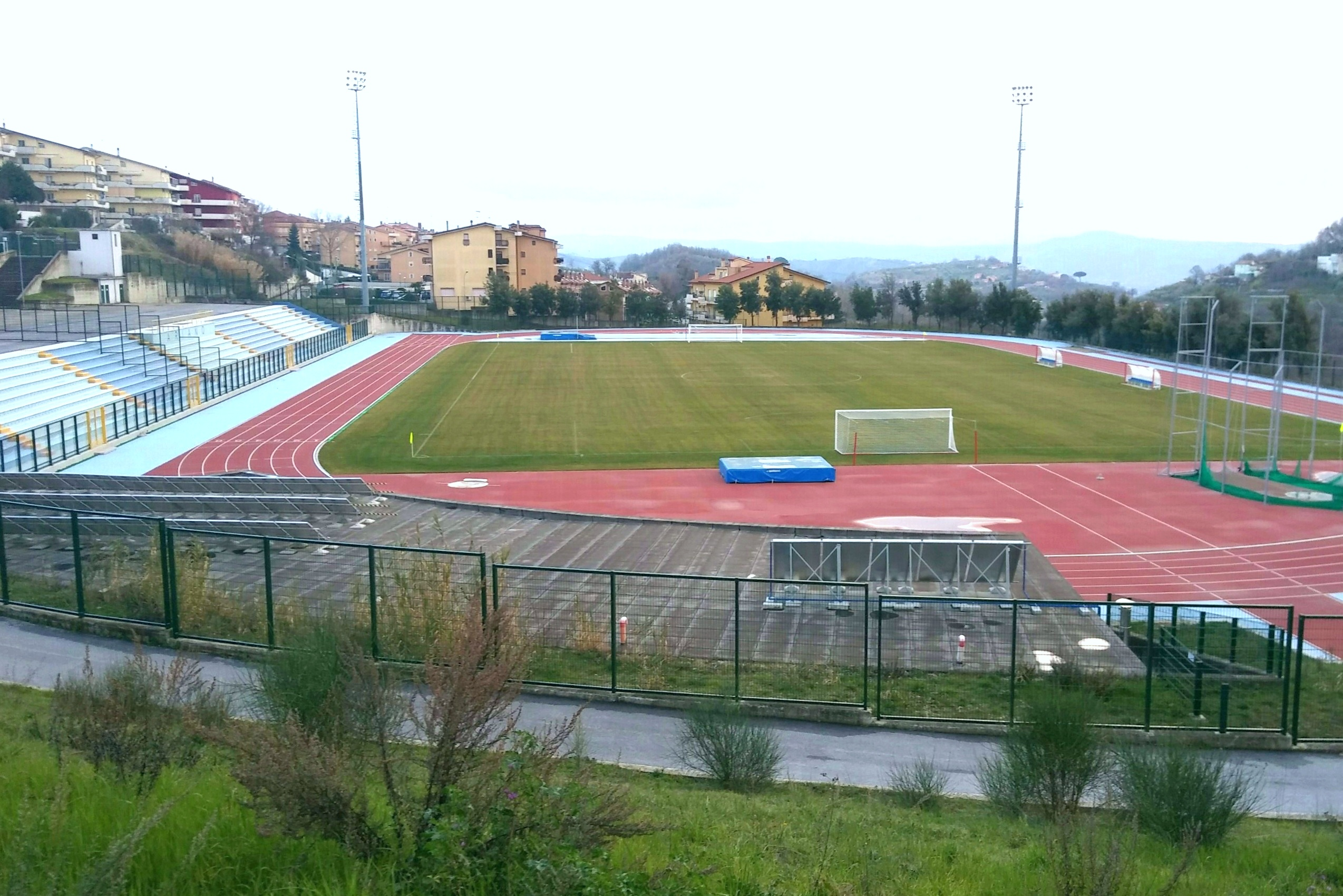
Panoramic view of the arena-stadium

Over thirty sports associations operate within the municipal territory, engaging in various competitive disciplines and affiliated with their respective sports promotion bodies.

=== Sports facilities ===
The historic "Silvio Renzulli" stadium, built in the first half of the 20th century, is situated on a slope at the foot of the Municipal Park. In addition to a 700-seat artificial turf field, it features a tennis court (covered during the cold season) located higher up within the park’s perimeter.

The sports hall, certified for professional use with a capacity of 2,000, hosted events during the XXX Summer Universiade in 2019.

The natural turf arena-stadium, also approved for competitive use and named after sprinter Pietro Mennea, has stands for 2,000 spectators.

Also noteworthy are the covered multipurpose field "La Maddalena" and the extensive complex "La Tartaruga". In total, the city has more than thirty sports facilities.

== Notable people ==
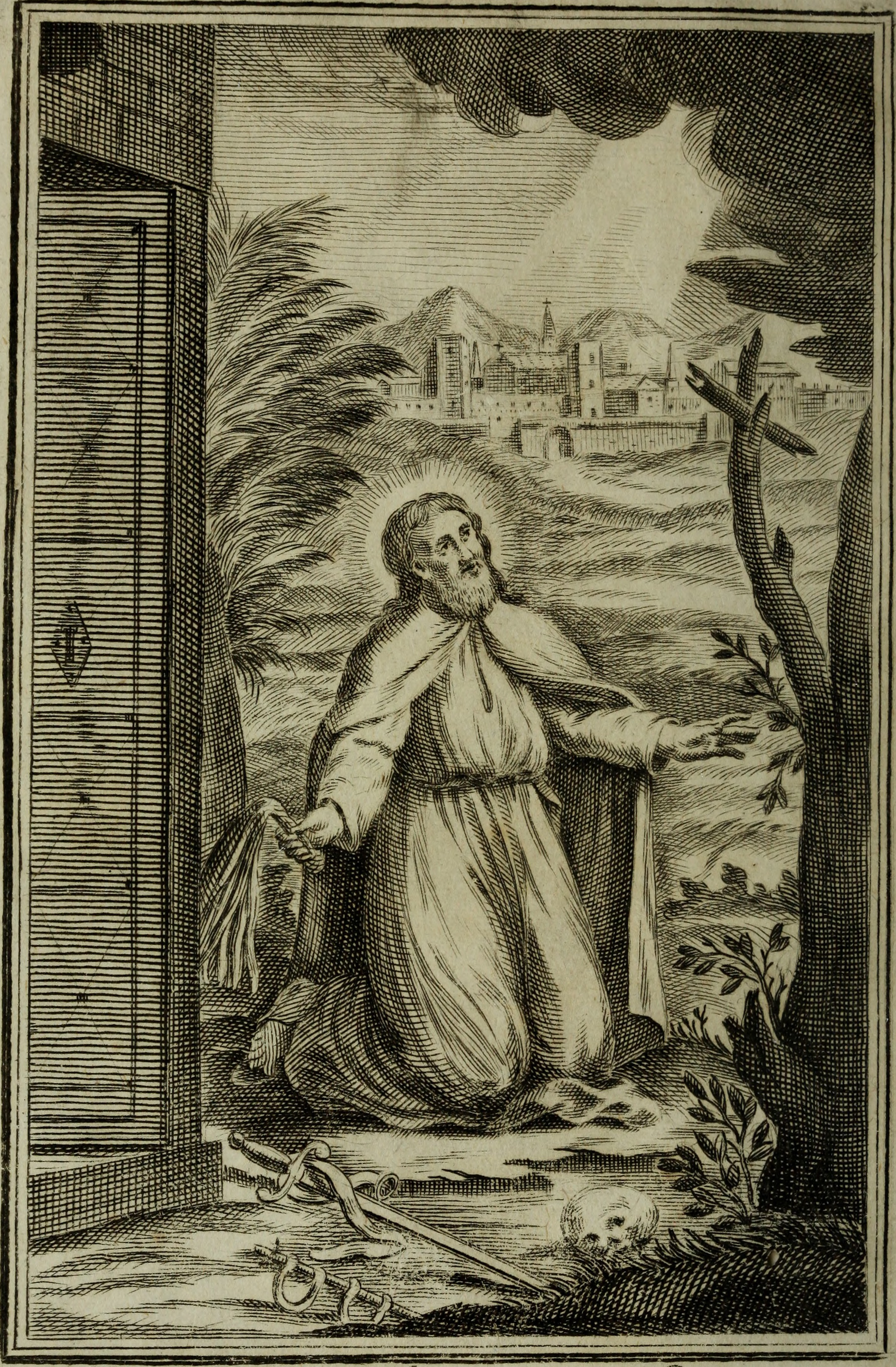
Saint Ottone Frangipane

- Ottone Frangipane (1040–1127), hermit
- Jordan of Ariano (d. 1127), Count of Ariano
- Saint Elzéar of Sabran (1285–1323), Count of Ariano
- Hieronymus Angerianus (1470–1535), humanist
- Diomede Carafa (1492–1560), bishop and cardinal
- Pietro Paolo Parzanese (1809–1852), poet
- Maria Piazza (1894–1976), mineralogist
- Enea Franza (1907–1986), politician
- Luigi Franza (1939–2020), politician
- Ortensio Zecchino (b. 1943), academic and politician
- Francesca Albanese (b. 1977), legal scholar, expert on human rights, and first woman to be the United Nations Special Rapporteur on the occupied Palestinian territories
- Luca Morelli (b. 1987), motorcycle racer
- Pasquale Grasso (b. 1988), jazz guitarist

== See also ==
- Assizes of Ariano
- Ariano Irpino Cathedral
- Arianese dialect
- Roman Catholic Diocese of Ariano Irpino-Lacedonia
- City Museum and Ceramics Gallery (Ariano Irpino)

== Bibliography ==
- Vitale, Tommaso (1794). Storia della Regia città di Ariano e sua Diocesi [History of the Royal City of Ariano and Its Diocese] (in Italian). Roma: Salomoni.
- Flammia, Nicola (1893). Storia della città di Ariano [History of the City of Ariano] (in Italian). Ariano: G. Marino. OCLC 886285390.
- Gabriele Grasso (1893). Studi di storia antica e di topografia storica [Studies in Ancient History and Historical Topography] (in Italian). Ariano: Stabilimento Appulo-Irpino. OCLC 560107952.
- Regione Campania, Centro di Servizi Culturali di Ariano Irpino, ed. (1995). Progetto itinerari turistici Campania interna - La Valle del Miscano [Inner Campania Tourist Itineraries Project - The Miscano Valley] (in Italian). Vol. 2. Avellino: Ruggiero.
- Stanco, Gianfranco (2012). Gli statuti di Ariano [The Statutes of Ariano] (in Italian). Ariano Irpino: Centro europeo di studi normanni. ISBN 978-88-98028-08-5.
- Paola Massa (2014), Vivere "secundum Langobardorum legem" ad Ariano Irpino tra X e XII secolo [Living "According to Lombard Law" in Ariano Irpino Between the 10th and 12th Centuries] (PDF), Firenze University Press, archived (PDF) from the original on 20 December 2020
- Statuto comunale, "Statuto comunale" [Municipal Statute], Comune di Ariano Irpino, archived from the original on 11 November 2018
- Corvino, Claudio (2002). Guida insolita ai misteri, ai segreti, alle leggende e alle curiosità della Campania [Unusual Guide to the Mysteries, Secrets, Legends, and Curiosities of Campania] (in Italian). Newton & Compton. ISBN 9788882896409.
- Busino, Nicola (2009). L'alta valle del Cervaro fra tarda antichità e alto medioevo: dati preliminari per una ricerca topografica [The Upper Cervaro Valley Between Late Antiquity and the Early Middle Ages: Preliminary Data for a Topographic Study] (PDF) (in Italian). Tavolario. ISBN 978-88-90432-30-9. Archived (PDF) from the original on 5 November 2020.
- Basile, Gianpaolo; Diana, Paolo; Vitale, Maria Prosperina, eds. (2015). La definizione identitaria di un territorio rurale - Benessere e antichi mestieri nell'Alta Irpinia [The Identity Definition of a Rural Territory - Well-Being and Ancient Trades in Upper Irpinia] (in Italian). FrancoAngeli. ISBN 9788891738189.
- Schiaparelli, Celestino (1883). L'Italia descritta nel "Libro del re Ruggero" [Italy Described in the "Book of King Roger"] (in Italian).
- d’Antuono, Nicola (2002). Locorum nomina - Ariano et contorni - Cenni di toponomastica rurale [Names of Places - Ariano and Surroundings - Notes on Rural Toponymy] (in Italian). Ariano Irpino.
- Boccardo, Gerolamo (1876). Nuova enciclopedia italiana [New Italian Encyclopedia] (in Italian). Vol. 2 (6 ed.). Unione tipografico-editrice torinese.
- Guida ai festival 08-09. Un anno di eventi culturali in Italia [Guide to Festivals 08-09. A Year of Cultural Events in Italy] (in Italian). Morellini Editore. 2008. ISBN 9788889550304.
- Grasso, Antonio; Tiso, Tullio (1991). Un saluto da Ariano, viaggio attraverso la cartolina d'epoca [A Greeting from Ariano, Journey Through Vintage Postcards] (in Italian). Avellino: Ariano Irpino.
- Report Energia (1ª-2ª edizione 2022) [Energy Report (1st-2nd Edition 2022)] (in Italian). Gruppo 24 Ore. 2022. ISBN 9791254830390.
- Touring Club Italiano (2002). Guida rapida d'Italia [Quick Guide to Italy] (in Italian). Vol. 5. Milano: Touring Editore. ISBN 9788836523894.
- Cremona, Luigi (2004). Alberghi e ristoranti d'Italia [Hotels and Restaurants of Italy] (in Italian). Touring Editore. ISBN 9788836530694.
