= Seppia gens =

Ancient Roman family

The gens Seppia was an obscure plebeian family at ancient Rome. Few members of this gens appear in history, but many are known from inscriptions.

== Origin ==
The nomen Seppius is a patronymic surname derived from the Oscan praenomen Seppiis or Seppius, cognate with the rare Latin praenomen Septimus, and its more common derivative, the nomen Septimius. The root of all these names is the numeral seven, which in the earliest period would have been given either to a seventh child or seventh son, or to a child born in the month of September, originally the seventh month of the Roman calendar. The majority of the Seppii known from inscriptions seem to have lived in Samnium and adjacent portions of Italy, where Oscan languages were spoken; a large number of these are from the neighbourhoods of Beneventum and Venusia, in the southern part of the region. Chase lists Seppius among those nomina that were not of Roman origin, but which originated in other parts of Italy.

== Praenomina ==
The Seppii bore a variety of common praenomina, apparently preferring Gaius, Marcus, Lucius, and Publius. In inscriptions there are also multiple instances of Aulus, Sextus Quintus, and Numerius, of which the last was relatively scarce at Rome, although common in Oscan-speaking regions, such as Samnium.

== Branches and cognomina ==
As they only seem to have become incorporated into the Roman state toward the end of the Republic, the Seppii are not known to have been divided into separate branches. Although many early Seppii bore no cognomen, the family used a wide range of familiar surnames in imperial times. The most abundant of these seems to have been Rufus, referring to the colour red, and usually bestowed upon someone with red hair. This was typical of a large class of cognomina derived from a person's physical features, which often became hereditary over time, although it is not known whether the Seppii Rufi of Abellinum and Venusia constituted a distinct family.

== Members ==
This list includes abbreviated praenomina. For an explanation of this practice, see filiation.

- Seppia, the mother of Lucius Petronius Rebilus, according to an inscription from Clusium in Etruria.
- Seppia, the wife of a veteran of the third legion, buried at Lambaesis in Numidia, whose name is preserved only as the initials "P. S."
- Seppia, named in a sepulchral inscription from Patavium in Venetia and Histria, dating to the first half of the first century.
- Seppia Ɔ. l., a freedwoman named in an inscription from Casilinum in Campania, dating to the latter half of the first century BC, or the first half of the first century BC.
- Seppius, a companion of Marcius Celer; along with Celer's granddaughter Marcia and Arria Crescens, he dedicated a monument at Ravenna in Celer's memory.
- Aulus Seppius A. f., one of several persons mentioned in an inscription from Casilinum, dating to 104 BC.
- Gaius Seppius C. f., named in an inscription from Concordia in Venetia and Histria, dating to the late first or early second century.
- Gaius Seppius M. f., named along with Marcus Seppius Canus, probably either his father or his brother, in an inscription from Venafrum in Samnium, dating to the first half of the first century.
- Gaius Seppius P. f., named in an inscription from Opitergium in Venetia and Histria, dating to the latter half of the first century BC.
- Lucius Seppius L. f., along with his son, Lucius, made an offering to Hercules at Uria in Calabria, in the latter part of the second or early part of the first century BC.
- Lucius Seppius L. f. L. n., along with his father, Lucius, made an offering to Hercules at Uria in the latter second or early first century BC.
- Marcus Seppius, named in a fragmentary inscription from Pompeii in Campania.
- Titus Seppius, a potter who worked in the Alpine province of Alpes Poeninae at an uncertain period, between the first and third centuries.
- Gaius Seppius Achoristus, buried at Rome, with a tomb dedicated by his client, Gaius Seppius Primigenius.
- Seppia Amarantis, buried in a second-century tomb at Venusia in Samnium, dedicated by her sons, Seppius Ampliatus and Pactolus.
- Seppius Ampliatus, along with his brother, Pactolus, dedicated a second-century monument at Venusia to their mother, Seppia Amarantis.
- Seppia A. l. Apate, a freedwoman who dedicated a first-century sepulchre at Rome for herself, her former master, Aulus Seppius Philomusus, and their freedmen.
- Gaius Seppius C. l. Aphrodisius, a freedman named in an inscription from Rome, dating to the era of the Julio-Claudian dynasty.
- Seppia Benivola, buried at Venusia in the second or third quarter of the second century, with a tomb dedicated by her husband, Quintus Seppius Fortunus.
- Marcus Seppius M. f. Canus, named along with a Gaius Seppius, probably either his brother or his son, in an inscription from Venafrum, dating to the first half of the first century.
- Marcus Seppius Castor, buried at Rome in the latter half of the first century, or the first half of the second, in a tomb dedicated by his son, Marcus Seppius Hermes.
- Seppia Chrysaspis, buried at Concordia along with Seppia Thisbe and Quintus Valerius Anthus, in a tomb dating to the late first or early second century.
- Marcus Seppius Creon, gave offerings to Hercules and Mercury at Mogontiacum in Germania Superior.
- Gnaeus Seppius Sex. f. Cordus, buried at Terventum in Samnium, aged eight, along with his brothers, Sextus Seppius Maximus and Publius Seppius Severus, in a tomb built by their parents, Sextus Seppius Severus and Varia Maxima, dating to the late first century BC or early first century AD.
- Gaius Seppius Crescens, the husband of Novellia Trophime, and stepfather of Lucius Novellius Lucifer, he was buried at the age of seventy-five, in a family sepulchre built by his stepson at Dyrrachium in Macedonia, dating from the first century.
- Gaius Seppius C. f. Curvus, one of the municipal duumvirs of Aeclanum in Samnium, where he dedicated a sepulchre for himself, his wife, Spendia Prima, and his son, Gaius Seppius Sabinus.
- Seppius Ɔ. l. Davus, a freedman named in a dedicatory inscription from Casilinum, dating to the first century BC or first century AD.
- Publius Seppius P. l. Faustus, a freedman who dedicated a sepulchre at Mutina in Cisalpine Gaul, dating to the late first century BC or early first century AD, for himself, Publius Seppius Lepidus, and Severa, his concubine.
- Seppia C. l. Fidelis, a freedwoman who made two offerings at Aequum Tuticum in Samnium, dating to the second century, or the last part of the first.
- Seppia L. l. Fortunata, a freedwoman named in an inscription from Rome, dating to the first half of the first century.
- Seppius Fortunatus, dedicated a tomb for his wife, Tatia Felicitas, aged forty, at Telesia in Samnium, dating to the second half of the second century, or the first half of the third.
- Quintus Seppius Fortunus, dedicated a second century tomb at Venusia to his wife, Seppia Benivola.
- Marcus Seppius C. f. Galata, named in a first-century inscription from Volturnum in Campania.
- Marcus Seppius M. f. Hermes, dedicated a tomb at Rome to his father, Marcus Seppius Castor, dating to the latter half of the first century, or the first half of the second.
- Seppia Hesperis, buried at Venusia in the late second century, with a tomb built by Seppius Silvanus.
- Seppia Justina, dedicated a tomb at Fusolae in Samnium, dating to the late second century, or the first half of the third, to her husband, Lucius Pullidius Phoebianus, aged forty-two.
- Publius Seppius P. l. Lepidus, a freedman buried in a family sepulchre built at Mutina by Publius Seppius Faustus for himself, Lepidus, and his concubine, Severa.
- Seppia L. l. Lyde, daughter of the freedwoman Seppia Psyche, with whom she was buried at Isturgi in Hispania Baetica, aged five, in a tomb dating to the late second century.
- Marcus Seppius M. f. Macer, dedicated a monument at Beneventum in Samnium to his mother, Vibbia.
- Seppius Marcellus, buried at Numerus Syrorum in Mauretania Caesariensis, having died on the tenth day before the Kalends of December (November 22) in AD 316, aged about forty years, with a monument dedicated by his brother, Seppius Secundus.
- Sextus Seppius Sex. f. Maximus, buried at Terventum, aged eighteen, along with his brothers, Gnaeus Seppius Cordus and Publius Seppius Severus, in a tomb built by their parents, Sextus Seppius Severus and Varia Maxima, dating to the late first century BC or early first century AD.
- Aulus Seppius Moderatus, a curator named in an inscription from Volsinii in Etruria.
- Seppia Morda, mentioned in an inscription from Pompeii.
- Lucius Seppius Nepos, aged thirty, buried at Macomades in Numidia, along with Prosia Januaria, aged eighty-five.
- Seppia M. l. Nice, a freedwoman buried at Rome, along with the freedman Marcus Stallius Philotimus.
- Lucius Seppius Paullus, dedicated a tomb at Frequentum in Samnium to his wife, Ennia Restituta.
- Aulus Seppius Philomusus, the former master of Seppia Apate, who built a first-century tomb at Rome for herself, Philomusus, and their freedmen.
- Gaius Seppius C. l. Pierus, a freedman buried in a first-century tomb at Aesernia in Samnium, along with his wife, Floria Restituta.
- Marcus Seppius M. l. Philoxenus, a freedman awarded 10,000 Sestertii out of the estate of a freedwoman named Primigenia, according to a first-century inscription from Teanum Sidicinum in Campania.
- Seppia C. f. Polla, named in an inscription from Saturnia in Etruria, dating to the latter half of the first century BC, or the first half of the first century AD.
- Numerius Seppius Polus, buried at Rome, together with his wife, Claudia Secunda; their slave, Atimetus, dedicated a monument in their memory.
- Seppia N. f. A. n. Posilla, buried at Aeclanum, along with her parents, Numerius Seppius Secundus, and Critia Polla.
- Publius Seppius Potens, the husband of Veneria, according to an inscription from Rome, dating between AD 30 and 70.
- Seppia C. f. Praesentina, the wife of Lucius Terentius Verus, one of the municipal duumvirs at Bedaium in Noricum, with whom she was buried in a second-century tomb dedicated by their sons, Lucius Terentius Verinus and Gaius Terentius Praesentinus.
- Gaius Seppius Primigenius, dedicated a tomb at Rome to his patron, Gaius Seppius Achoristus.
- Seppius Primus, the foster son of Seppius Proculus, was buried at Luceria in Apulia, aged four, between AD 130 and 150.
- Lucius Seppius L. l. Princeps, a freedman buried at the modern site of Vicalvi in Latium, aged twenty-two; his monument begs his mother not to weep for him, for his time had come.
- Seppius Proculus, the foster father of Seppius Primus, a boy buried at Luceria between AD 130 and 150.
- Seppia L. l. Psyche, a freedwoman buried at Isturgi, aged forty, along with her daughter, Seppia Lyde, aged five.
- Seppia Pyrallis, the wife of Lucius Ostorius Fortunatus, who built a family sepulchre at Rome for himself, his patron, Lucius Ostorius Felix, and his freedmen.
- Sextus Seppius Rogatus, buried at Sufetula in Africa Proconsularis, aged seventy.
- Seppia Rufina, the mistress of Jovianus, a slave child buried at Venusia, aged eleven months and twenty-two days, in a second-century sepulchre built by Capriolus for himself, Jovianus, Aper, and Jovica.
- Seppia Rufina, the mistress of slaves mentioned in a fragmentary inscription from Venusia, dating to the middle of the third century.
- Seppius Rufus, the master of Rhodanus, a nomenclator, named in an inscription from Venusia, dating to the first quarter of the first century.
- Gaius Seppius L. f. Rufus, a pontifex, and duumvir quinquennalis with the rank of praetor from an uncertain municipality, perhaps Abellinum in Samnium. He and his son, Gaius, dedicated a first-century tomb in that area to his wife, Calvia Sanctilla, a freedwoman, who died aged twenty-seven years and six months.
- Gaius Seppius C. f. L. n. Rufus, along with his father, the pontifex Gaius Seppius Rufus, dedicated a first-century tomb near Abellinum to his mother, Calvia Sanctilla.
- Quintus Seppius Q. f. Rufus, buried at Aequum Tuticum, along with Gavioleia Rufa, with a tomb paid for by the estate of Crittia Polla.
- Seppius Sabinus, named in a first century dedicatory inscription from Parma in Cisalpine Gaul.
- Gaius Seppius C. f. C. n. Sabinus, aged eight, buried at Aeclanum, along with his parents, Gaius Seppius Curvus and Spendia Prima.
- Gaius Seppius C. l. Salvius, a freedman buried at Saepinum in Samnium during the first or second century, along with his mother-in-law, the freedwoman Magia Andracis, in a tomb built by his wife, Magia Stadio, also a freedwoman.
- Seppia Saturina, buried at Numerus Syrorum.
- Seppius Secundus, dedicated a monument at Numerus Syrorum to his brother, Seppius Marcellus, who died in AD 316.
- Numerius Seppius A. f. Secundus, buried at Aeclanum along with his wife, Critia Polla, and their daughter, Seppia Posilla.
- Publius Seppius Severus, a decurion and municipal duumvir at Bedaium, named in a sepulchral inscription, along with Claudius Juvavus and Claudia Florentina.
- Publius Seppius Sex. f. Severus, one of the municipal duumvirs of Terventum, where he was buried, aged twenty-nine, along with his brothers, Gnaeus Seppius Cordus and Sextus Seppius Maximus, in a tomb built by their parents, Sextus Seppius Severus and Varia Maxima, dating to the late first century BC, or early first century AD.
- Sextus Seppius Severus, the husband of Varia Maxima, with whom he dedicated a tomb at Terventum for their sons, Gnaeus Seppius Cordus, Sextus Seppius Maximus, and Publius Seppius Severus, dating to the late first century BC or early first century AD.
- Seppius Silvanus, built a late second-century tomb at Venusia for Seppia Hesperis.
- Seppia Tertia, donated a pot in memory of Gaius Propertius Idaeus, the son of Gaius Propertius Epitynchanus, buried at Rome aged nineteen years and six months.
- Seppia Thisbe, buried at Concordia, together with Seppia Chrysaspis and Quintus Valerius Anthus, in a tomb dating to the late first or early second century.
- Seppia Ther[...], buried at Rome, together with Manturia N[...], in a tomb built by Publius Longinius for his family and freedmen.
- Seppia Trophime, built a tomb at Rome for her husband, Ofincius Felix, and their children, Aprilis and Quinquatralis, dating to the latter half of the first century, or the first half of the second.

== See also ==
- List of Roman gentes

== Bibliography ==
- Theodor Mommsen et alii, Corpus Inscriptionum Latinarum (The Body of Latin Inscriptions, abbreviated CIL), Berlin-Brandenburgische Akademie der Wissenschaften (1853–present).
- Wilhelm Henzen, Ephemeris Epigraphica: Corporis Inscriptionum Latinarum Supplementum (Journal of Inscriptions: Supplement to the Corpus Inscriptionum Latinarum, abbreviated EE), Institute of Roman Archaeology, Rome (1872–1913).
- René Cagnat et alii, L'Année épigraphique (The Year in Epigraphy, abbreviated AE), Presses Universitaires de France (1888–present).
- George Davis Chase, "The Origin of Roman Praenomina", in Harvard Studies in Classical Philology, vol. VIII, pp. 103–184 (1897).
- Inscriptiones Italiae (Inscriptions from Italy), Rome (1931–present).
- Hans Petersen, "The Numeral Praenomina of the Romans", in Transactions of the American Philological Association, vol. xciii, pp. 347–354 (1962).
- Bayerische Vorgeschichtsblätter (Notes on Bavarian History), Bavarian Academy of Sciences, (1975–1989).
