= Tuticana gens =

Ancient Roman family

The gens Tuticana, sometimes written Tuticania, was an obscure plebeian family at ancient Rome. Only a few members of this gens are mentioned in history, but a number are known from inscriptions.

== Origin ==
The nomen Tuticanus belongs to a class of gentilicia formed from cognomina ending in -as, -atis, or -anus, all typically derived from the names of towns. Tuticanus refers to a native of Tuticum, a town of the Hirpini, a Samnite people.

== Praenomina ==
Most of the Tuticani known from epigraphy bore the praenomen Gaius, one of the most abundant names at all periods of Roman history. Other members of this gens also bore common praenomina, including Publius, Quintus, and Titus.

== Members ==
This list includes abbreviated praenomina. For an explanation of this practice, see filiation.

- Flavius Tuticanus Gallus, (Note: So named in De Bello Civili, although Flavius was not a praenomen, and does not seem to have been his nomen gentilicium; this use of Flavius resembles a custom of the fourth or fifth century.) an eques in Caesar's army, who was slain at Dyrrhachium in 48 BC. His father was a senator.
- Tuticanus (Gallus), a senator, and the father of Flavius Tuticanus Gallus, an eques in Caesar's army who was slain at Dyrrhachium in 48 BC.
- Tuticanus, a friend of Ovid, who translated some or all of the Odyssey into Latin verse.
- Quintus Tuticanus Q. f. Eros, a Latin grammarian honored with a tomb built by the decurions of Verona in Venetia and Histria, dating between the reigns of Claudius and Vespasian. Quintus Tuticanus Felicianus is named in the same inscription.
- Quintus Tuticanus Felicianus, named in the middle first-century sepulchral inscription of the grammarian Quintus Tuticanus Eros at Verona.
- Gaius Tuticanus Saturninus, named in a series of dedicatory inscriptions from Porolissum in Dacia, Banasa in Mauretania Tingitana, and various other places, dating from AD 97 to 112.
- Gaius Tuticanus Helius, named in a military diploma from Brigetio in Pannonia Superior and several others, dating between AD 99 and 110.
- Gaius Tuticanus Crescens, named in a dedicatory inscription from an unknown province, dating from AD 115.
- Gaius Tuticanus Sophronius, dedicated a tomb at Rome, dating between the middle of the first century and the end of the second, for his young son, also named Gaius Tuticanus Sophronius.
- Gaius Tuticanus C. f. Sophronius, a little boy buried at Rome, aged three years, nine months, and fifteen days, in a tomb dedicated by his father, also named Gaius Tuticanus Sophronius, dating between the middle of the first century and the end of the second.
- Tuticanius Capito, a prefect in the praetorian guard, mentioned in an inscription from Sirmium in Pannonia Inferior, and several others, dating from AD 152 to 160.
- Tuticania Antiochis, dedicated a second- or third-century tomb at Rome for her husband, Hyginus.
- Publius Tuticanus Hermes, a beneficarius, a type of soldier assigned special duties, serving in the praetorian guard at Rome in AD 203.
- Titus Tuticanius Incitatus, along with his son, Tuticanius Valerius, dedicated a tomb at Rome, dating from the first half of the third century, for his wife, Aristobula, aged twenty-seven.
- (Titus) Tuticanius T. f. Valerius, along with his father, Titus Tuticanus Incitatus, dedicated a tomb at Rome, dating from the first half of the third century, for his mother, Aristobula.
- Tuticania Veneria, (Note: Spelled "Beneria" in the original inscription.) buried at Rome on the fourth day before the Ides of September (Note: September 10, by modern reckoning.) in an uncertain year during the middle portion of the fourth century, aged forty-four years, one day, in a tomb dedicated by Primus, perhaps her husband.

=== Undated Tuticani ===
- Gaius Tuticanus Callistus, along with his son, Gaius Tuticanus Maximus, built a tomb at Rome for his wife, Valeria Saturnina.
- Gaius Tuticanus C. f. Maximus, along with his father, Gaius Tuticanus Callistus, built a tomb at Rome for his mother, Valeria Saturnina.
- Tuticana Sophe, buried at Rome in a tomb dedicated by her father-in-law, Valerius Marinus.

== See also ==
- List of Roman gentes

== Bibliography ==
- Gaius Julius Caesar, Commentarii de Bello Civili (Commentaries on the Civil War).
- Publius Ovidius Naso (Ovid), Epistulae ex Ponto (Letters from Pontus).
- Johann Christian Wernsdorf, Poëtae Latini Minores (Minor Latin Poets), Altenburg, Helmstedt (1780–1799).
- Dictionary of Greek and Roman Biography and Mythology, William Smith, ed., Little, Brown and Company, Boston (1849).
- Theodor Mommsen et alii, Corpus Inscriptionum Latinarum (The Body of Latin Inscriptions, abbreviated CIL), Berlin-Brandenburgische Akademie der Wissenschaften (1853–present).
- Dictionary of Greek and Roman Geography, William Smith, ed., Little, Brown and Company, Boston (1854).
- René Cagnat et alii, L'Année épigraphique (The Year in Epigraphy, abbreviated AE), Presses Universitaires de France (1888–present).
- George Davis Chase, "The Origin of Roman Praenomina", in Harvard Studies in Classical Philology, vol. VIII, pp. 103–184 (1897).
- Paul von Rohden, Elimar Klebs, & Hermann Dessau, Prosopographia Imperii Romani (The Prosopography of the Roman Empire, abbreviated PIR), Berlin (1898).
- Inscriptiones Christianae Urbis Romae (Christian Inscriptions from the City of Rome, abbreviated ICUR), New Series, Rome (1922–present).
- T. Robert S. Broughton, The Magistrates of the Roman Republic, American Philological Association (1952–1986).
- Zeitschrift für Papyrologie und Epigraphik (Journal of Papyrology and Epigraphy, abbreviated ZPE), (1987).
