= Aeclanum =

Archaeological site in Italy

- Aeculanum
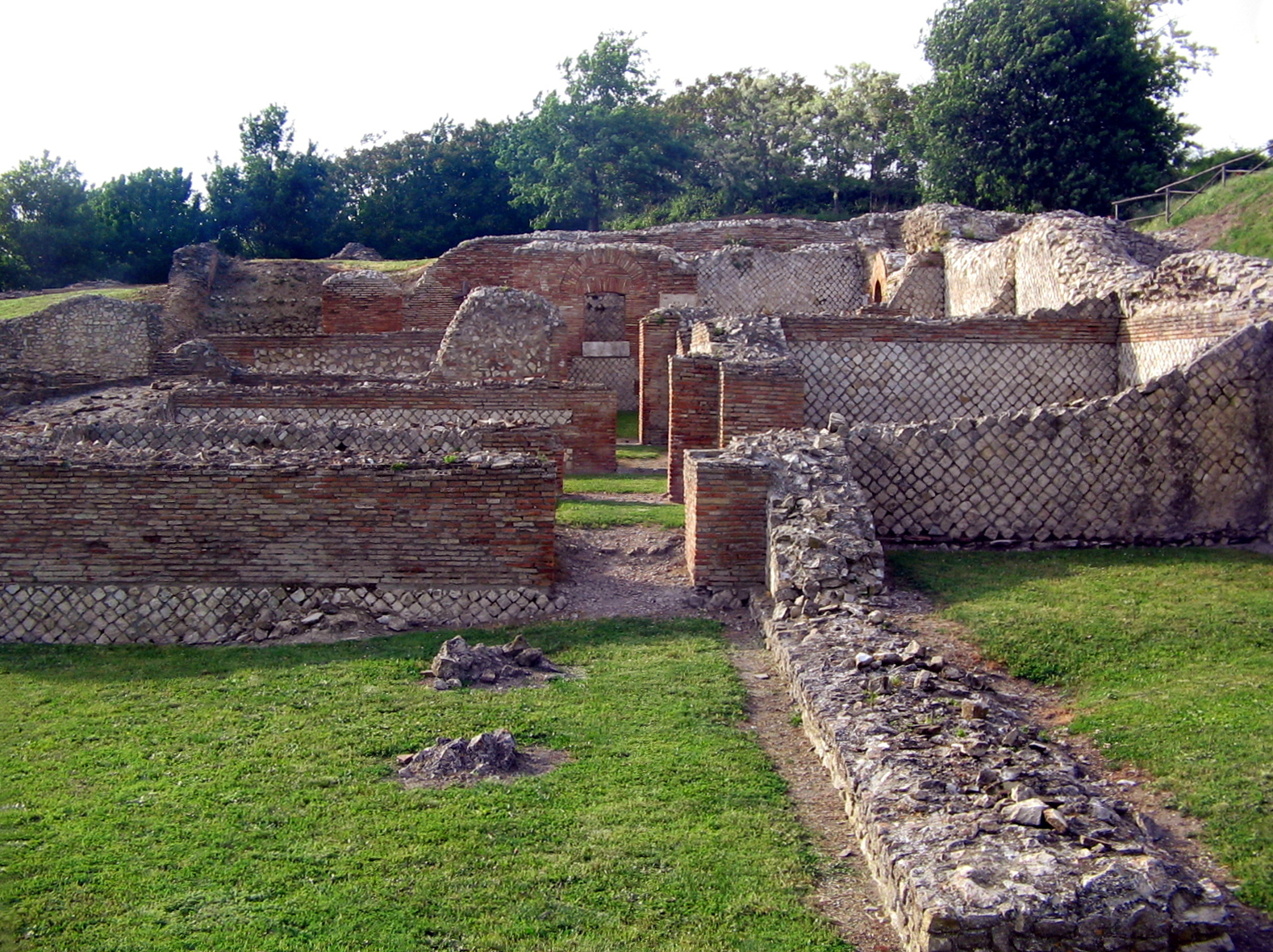
- View of the thermae with the opus reticulatum brickwork

- Location within Italy
- 41°3′14″N 15°0′40″E
- Type: Settlement
- Periods: Roman Republic – Byzantine Empire
- Cultures: Samnites – Ancient Rome
- Location: Mirabella Eclano, Province of Avellino
- Region: Campania

Site notes
- Archaeologists: Italo Sgobbo
- Management: Soprintendenza per i Beni Archeologici di Salerno, Avellino, Benevento e Caserta
- Public access: Yes
- Website: Aeclanum

UNESCO World Heritage Site
- Part of: Via Appia. Regina Viarum
- Criteria: Cultural: iii, iv, vi
- Reference: 1708-011
- Inscription: 2024 (46th Session)

Aeclanum (also spelled Aeculanum, Italian: Eclano, Ancient Greek: Ἀικούλανον) was an ancient town of Samnium, Southern Italy, about 25 km east-southeast of Beneventum, on the Via Appia. It lies in Passo di Mirabella, near the modern Mirabella Eclano.

It is now an archaeological park.

== Location ==
Aeclanum was on a promontory naturally defended, to some extent, by a steep slope on the south side down to the river Calore, while the north side lay open towards the crest of the ridge where the Via Appia ran. This led through Lacus Ampsanctus to Aquilonia and Venusia. Two other routes to Apulia, the Via Aemilia in Hirpinis and Via Aurelia Aeclanensis, diverged nearby, leading through Aequum Tuticum to Luceria and through Trivicum to Herdoniae respectively. The road from Aeclanum to Abellinum (modern Atripalda, near Avellino) may also follow an ancient line.

Today there are ruins of the city walls, of an aqueduct, baths and a macellum; nearly 400 inscriptions have also been discovered. Excavation has revealed a long history of pre-Roman settlement.

== History ==
Aeclanum was a town of the Hirpini, although it was never mentioned during the Samnite Wars. Sulla captured it in 89 BC by setting on fire the wooden breastwork by which it was defended, and sacked it. It quickly recovered, new fortifications were erected, and it became a municipium. Hadrian, who repaired the Via Appia from Beneventum to this point, made it a colonia (colony).

With the Lombard invasion of Italy, in the 6th century AD, it was annexed to the Duchy of Benevento, but was captured and destroyed by Eastern Roman forces under Constans II in 663 and never recovered, being reduced to a small hamlet known as Quintodecimo, a name that referred to its distance of 15 Roman miles from Benevento.

== Bishopric ==
Aeclanum became a Christian episcopal see, whose best known bishop was Julian of Eclanum, who was consecrated by Pope Innocent I in about 417. He refused to sign the condemnation of Pelagianism issued by Pope Innocent's successor, Pope Zosimus, and carried on a war of writings against Augustine of Hippo. It has been thought that the diocese was united to that of Frequentium as early as the 5th century, but there is mention of Quintodecimo as a suffragan see of Benevento in 969 and 1058. From 1059 it was definitively united with Frequentium. No longer a residential bishopric, Aeclanum is today listed by the Catholic Church as a titular see.

== Gallery ==
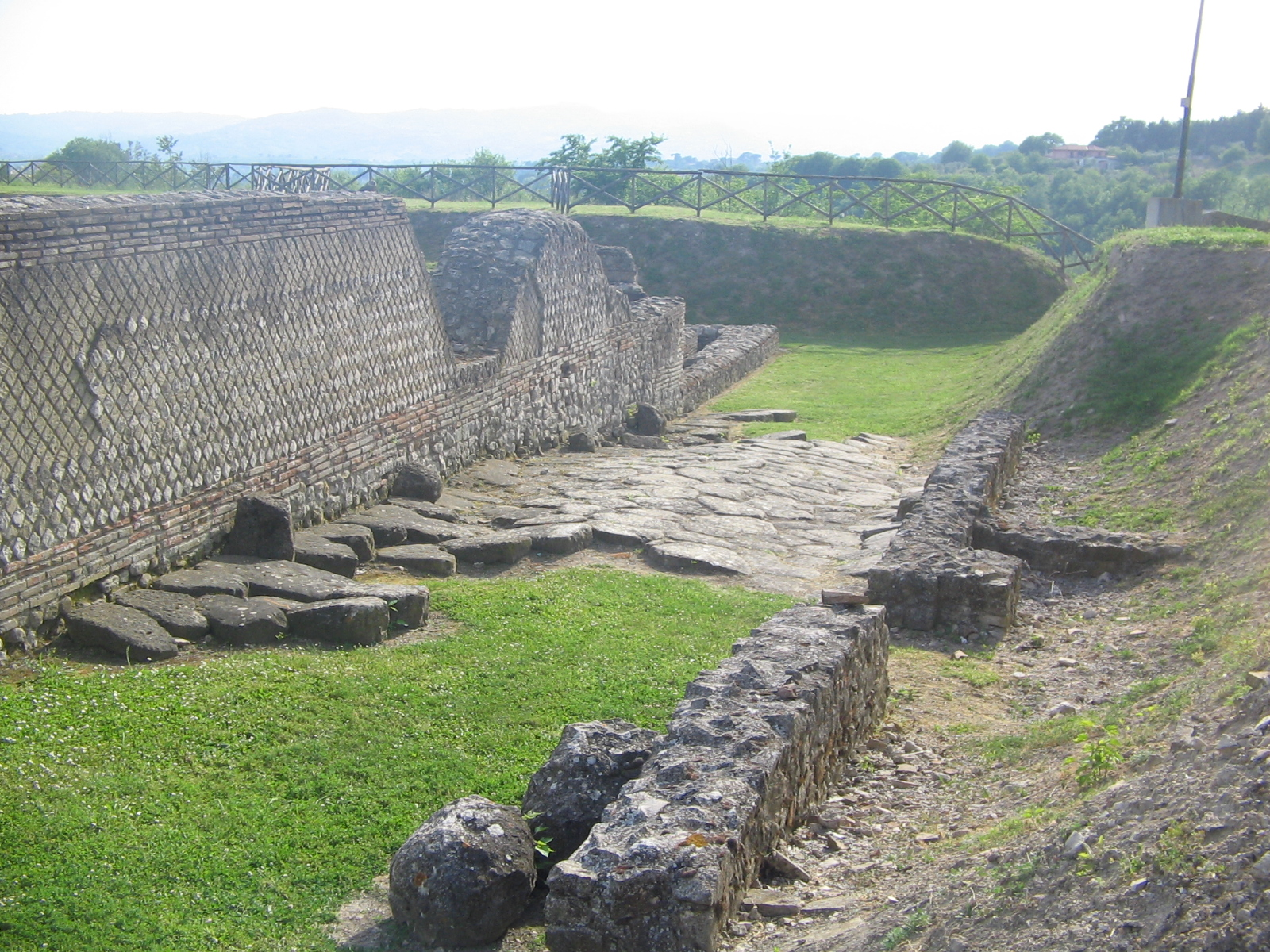
The central road

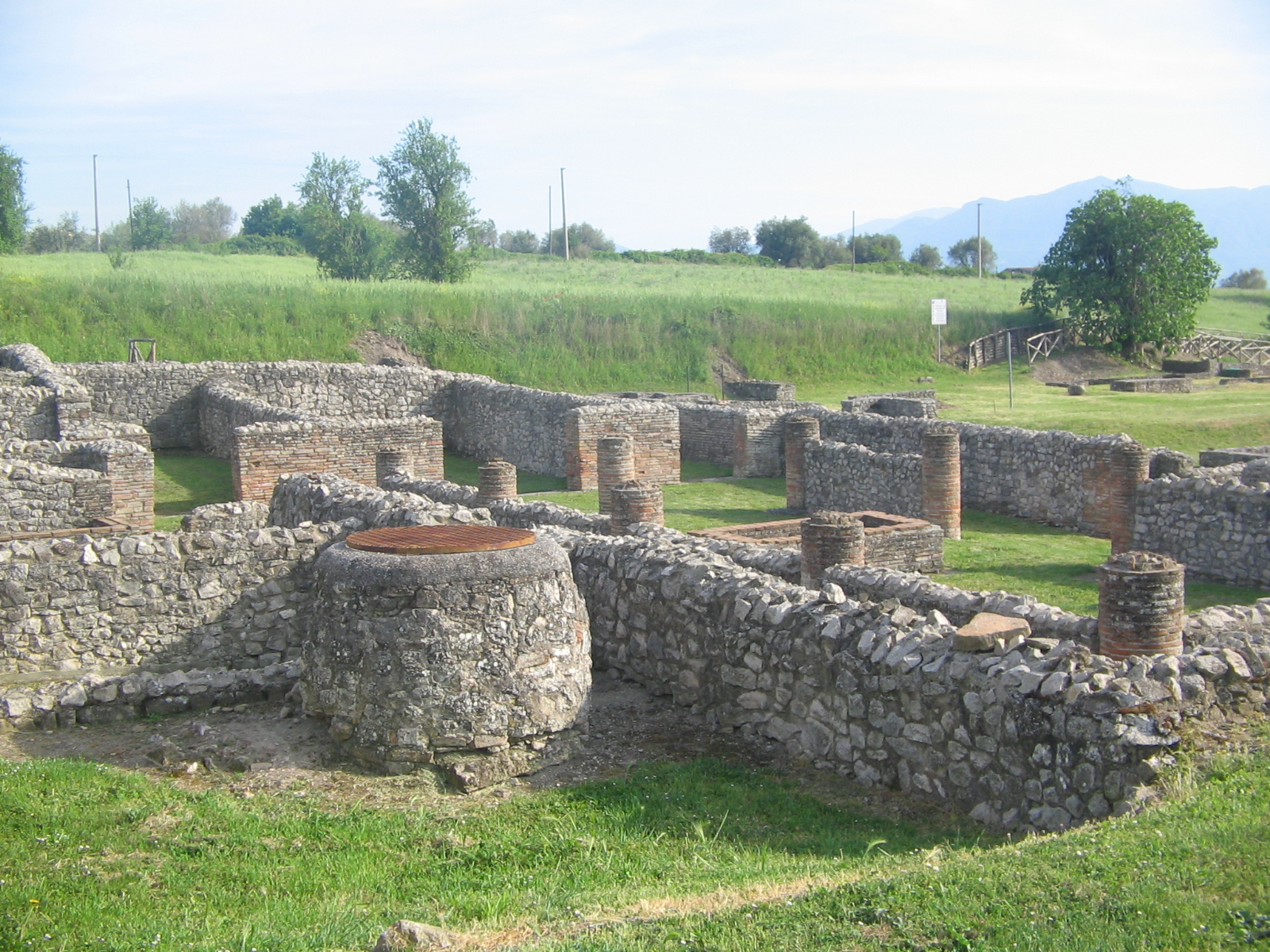
Remains of the houses (1)

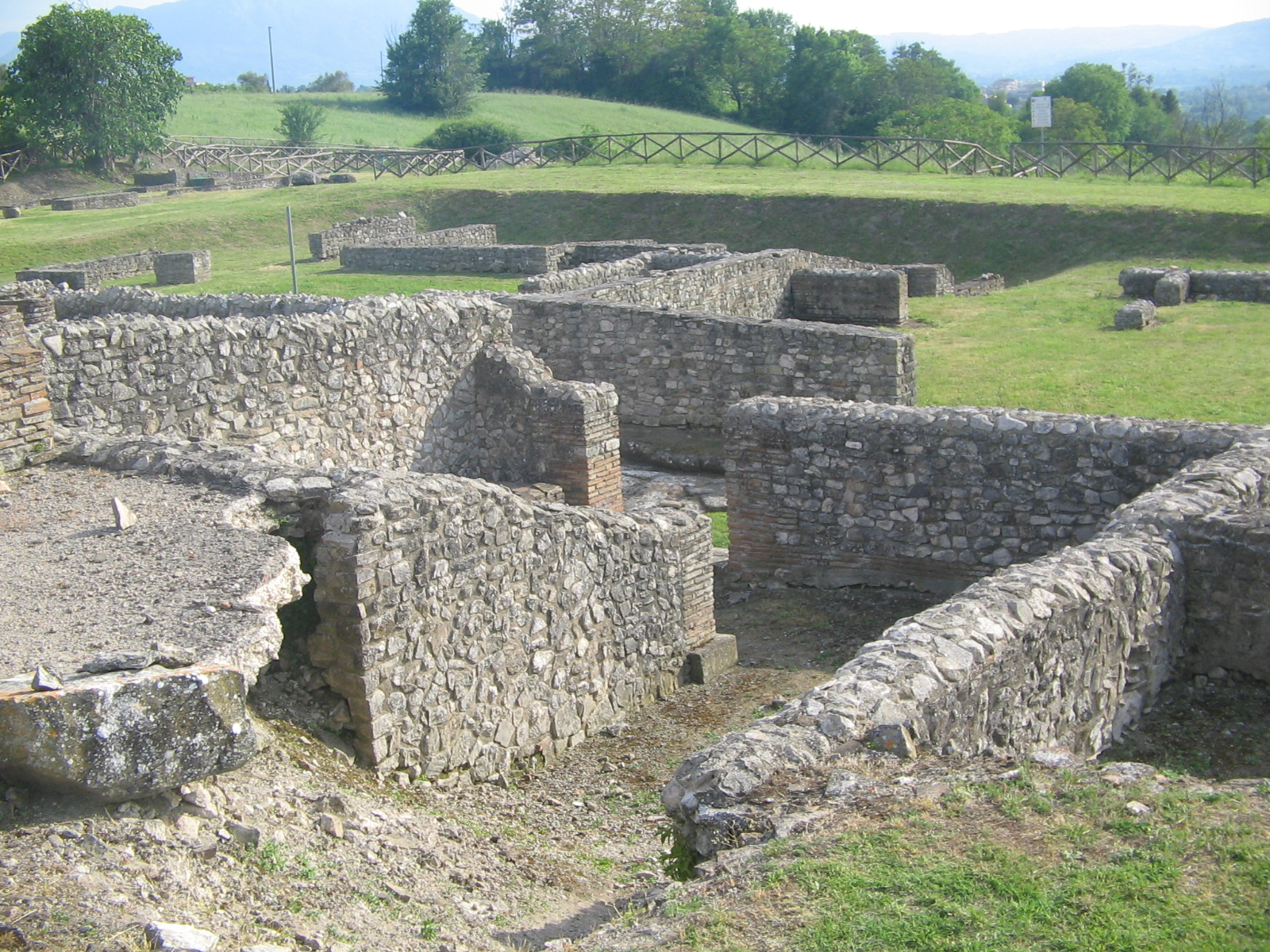
Remains of the houses (2)

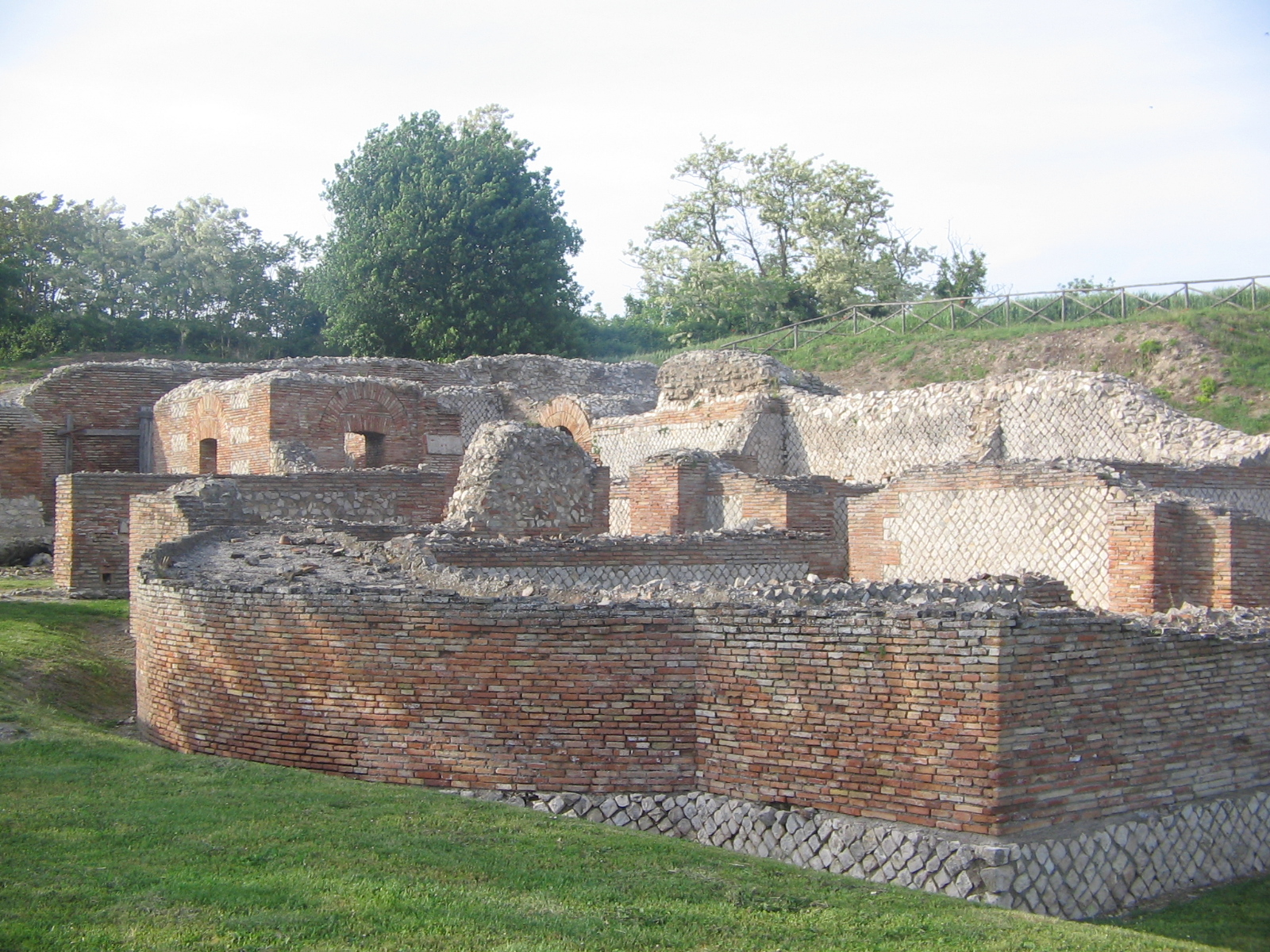
Side view of the thermae
