= Baccari =

Baccari is an Italian surname. The surname of the Baccari family (variants Baccaro, del Baccaro, de Baccariis), of Byzantine origin, depended on the green twigs with berries that are painted in the coat of arms; this aromatic plant in ancient times was used by the Greeks.

Notable people with the surname include:

- Alf Baccari (born 1928), Canadian ice hockey player
- Eduardo Baccari (1871–1952), Italian politician
