= Trivicum =

Ancient town in southern Italy

Trivicum is the ancient Hirpini and Samnium town nowadays called Trevico.

== Horace's visit ==
The Roman poet Horace mentions Trivicum in his well-known account of a journey in 37 BC along the Appian Way from Rome to Brindisi:

incipit ex illo montīs Apulia notos
ostentare mihi, quos torret Atabulus et quos
nunquam erepsemus, nisi nos vicina Trivici
villa recepisset lacrimoso non sine fumo,
udos cum foliis ramos urente camino.

'From there (Beneventum) Apulia began to show her familiar mountains to me, which the Atabulus wind scorches and which we would never have crawled over, had not a neighbouring villa in Trivicum welcomed us, not without eye-watering smoke, as the fireplace was burning damp branches along with their leaves.'
