= Hirpini =

Ancient Samnitic tribe

The Hirpini (Latin: Hirpini) were an ancient Samnite tribe of Southern Italy. While generally regarded as having been Samnites, sometimes they are treated as a distinct and independent nation. They inhabited the southern portion of Samnium, in the more extensive sense of that name, roughly the area now known as Irpinia from their name—a mountainous region bordering on Basilicata towards the south, on Apulia to the east, and on Campania towards the west. No marked natural boundary separated them from these neighboring nations, but they occupied the lofty masses and groups of the central Apennines, while the plains on each side, and the lower ranges that bounded them, belonged to their more fortunate neighbors. The mountain basin formed by the three tributaries of the Vulturnus (modern Volturno)—the Tamarus (modern Tammaro), Calor (modern Calore), and Sabatus (modern Sabato), which, with their valleys, unite near Beneventum, surrounded on all sides by lofty and rugged ranges of mountains—is the center and heart of their territory. They occupied the Daunian Mountains to the north, while its more southern portion comprised the upper valley of the Aufidus (modern Ofanto) and the lofty group of mountains where that river takes its rise.

== Name ==
Their name derives, according to ancient writers, from hirpus (the Oscan for 'wolf') and meant 'those who belong to the wolf'. In accordance with this derivation, their first ancestors were supposedly guided to their new settlements by a wolf. This tradition implies that the Hirpini were regarded as having migrated, like the other Sabellian peoples in the south of Italy, from the north, but when this migration occurred is unknown. From their position in the vastnesses of the central Apennines, they were probably there long before they first appear in history.

== Affiliations and history ==
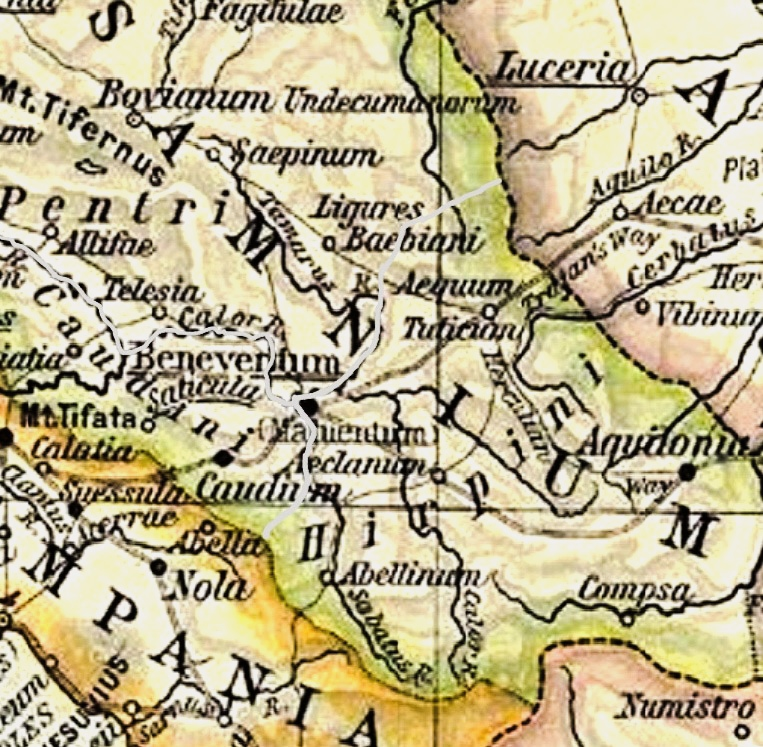
Map of ancient Hirpini's territory at the southeastern corner of Samnium; white lines show the possible tribal boundaries.

The early history of the Hirpini cannot be separated from that of the Samnites in general. Their name does not once occur in history during the long protracted struggle between the Romans and the Samnite confederacy (the Samnite Wars), though their territory was often the theatre of the war, and several of their cities, especially Maloenton (Roman Maleventum, modern Benevento), are repeatedly mentioned as bearing an important part in the military operations of both powers. Hence, the Hirpini at this time must have formed an integral part of the Samnite league, and were included by the Roman annalists (whose language on such points Livy follows with scrupulous fidelity) under the general name of Samnites, without distinguishing between the several tribes of that people. For the same reason we can't fix the exact period when the Romans subjugated them, but it must have been before 268 BC, when the Romans established their colony at Beneventum, a position that likely was the military key to the possession of their country.

In the Second Punic War, the Hirpini appear as an independent people, acting apart from the rest of the Samnites. Livy expressly uses the name of Samnium in contradistinction to the land of the Hirpini. The latter people was one of those that declared in favour of Hannibal immediately after the battle of Cannae, 216 BC; but the Roman colony of Beneventum never fell into the hands of the Carthaginian general. As early as the following year, three of the smaller towns of the Hirpini were recovered by the Roman praetor M. Valerius. In 214 BC, their territory was the scene of the operations of Hanno against Tiberius Sempronius Gracchus, and again in 212 BC of those of the same Carthaginian general with a view to the relief of Capua. It was not until 209 BC, when Hannibal lost all footing in the center of Italy, that the Hirpini submitted to Rome, and gained favourable terms by betraying the Carthaginian garrisons in their towns.

The Hirpini next figure in history in the Social War (90 BC), when they were among the first to take up arms against Rome. In the campaign of the following year, (89 BC), Sulla took Aeclanum, one of their strongest cities. The blow struck such terror into the rest that they offered submission, and were admitted to favourable terms. Even before this there appears to have been a party in the nation favorable to Rome, as Minatius Magius (the ancestor of the historian Velleius), a native of Aeclanum, was not only himself faithful to the Roman cause, but raised an auxiliary legion among his countrymen to support the Roman generals in Campania. The Hirpini were undoubtedly admitted to the Roman franchise after the war, and their national existence ended. They appear to have suffered less than their neighbours, the Samnites, from the ravages of the war, but considerable portions of their territory were confiscated, and it would seem, from a passage in Cicero, that a large part of it passed into the hands of wealthy Roman nobles.

By the division of Italy under Augustus, the Hirpini were separated from the other Samnites, and placed in the second Region along with Apulia and Calabria, while Samnium itself was included in the fourth Region. The same separation was retained also in the later divisions of Italy under the Roman Empire, according to which Samnium, in the more confined sense, formed a small separate province, while Beneventum and the greater part, if not all other towns of the Hirpini, were included in the province of Campania. The Liber Coloniarum includes all the towns of Samnium, as well as those of the Hirpini, among the "Civitates Campaniae", but this is probably a mistake.

=== Towns and cities ===
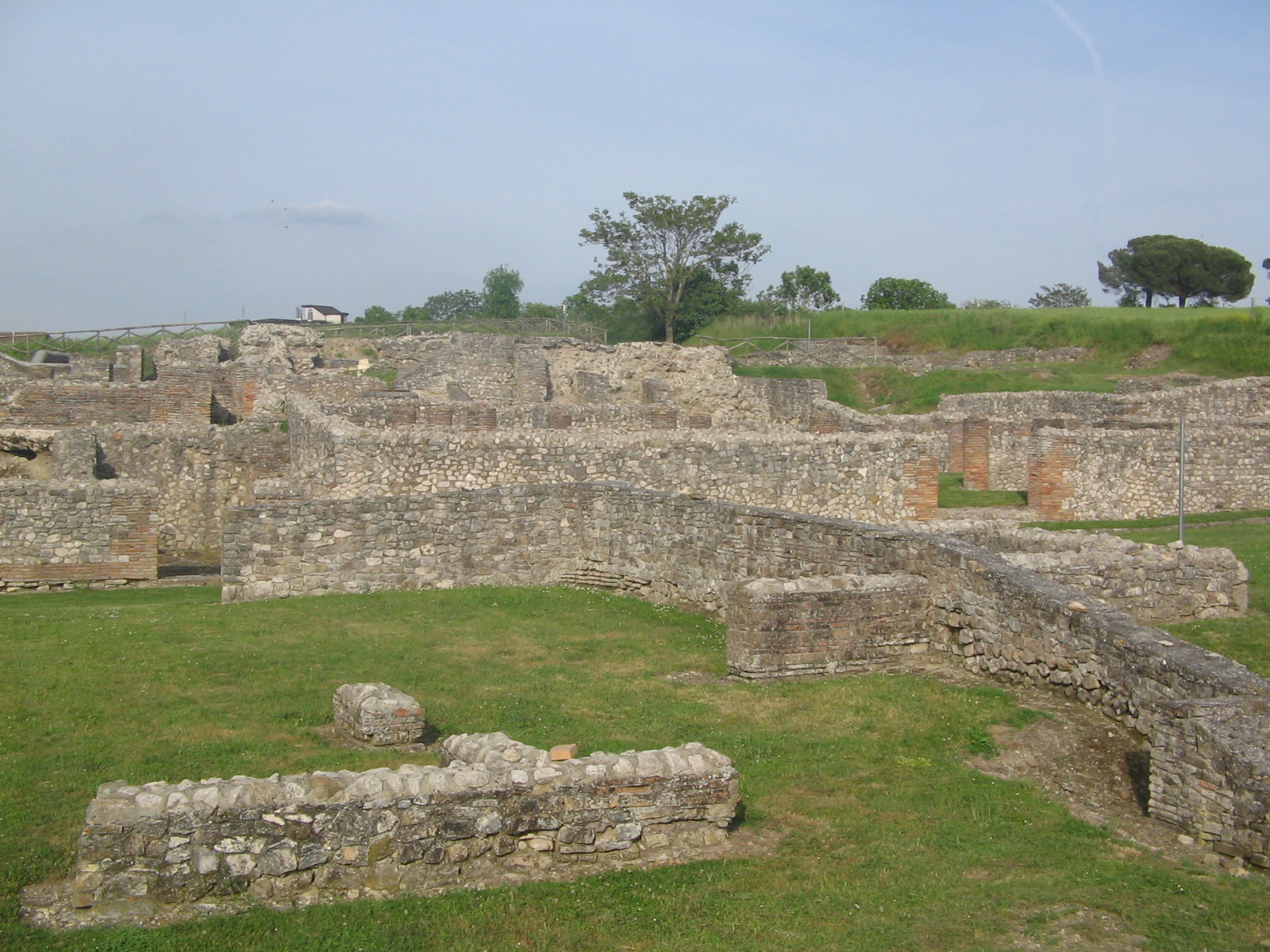
Ruins of the Roman town Aeclanum.

The national characteristics of the Hirpini cannot be separated from those of other Samnites. It is not always easy to separate the confines of the Hirpini from those of neighbouring Samnite tribes, especially in the Imperial period, when the original distinctions of the tribes were mostly obliterated. Pliny's list of towns in the second region of Italy is more than usually obscure, and those of the Hirpini and Apulia confused in a most perplexing manner. Towns assigned with certainty to the Hirpini include: Beneventum (although both Livy and Ptolemy consider it as belonging to the Samnites proper, as distinguished from the Hirpini), Aeclanum, Abellinum, Compsa, Aquilonia, Trivicum, Aequum Tuticum, and Vescellium.

Beneventum was the most important city in this part of Italy, and was often referred to as a Samnite town. Pliny called it the only Roman colony in Hirpini territory. Aeclanum was a flourishing and important town close to the heart of the Hirpini territory. Abellinum was on the border with Campania, and near the sources of the River Sabatus. Compsa (modern Conza) was near the head waters of the River Aufidus (Ofanto), and bordered with Lucania. Aquilonia (modern Lacedonia), Trivicum, Aequum Tuticum and Vescellium were near the border with Apulia, in the eastern portion of the Hirpinian territory.

In the valley of the River Tamarus, which was mentioned as being 5 miles above Beneventum in the Itinerary of Antoninus, there was Ligures Baebiani et Corneliani, a colony of Ligurians relocated in the heart of this mountain region by the Romans in 180 BC. It continued to exist as a separate community in the days of Pliny. Three of the minor towns of the Hirpini were mentioned by Livy as having been retaken by the praetor M. Valerius in 215 BC; but the names given in the manuscripts, Vescellium, Vercellium, and Sicilinum, are probably corrupted. They are otherwise unknown, except for Vescellium, which is also found in Pliny's list of towns and should be placed in the far north, on the way to Luceria. Fratulum, whose name is found only in Ptolemy, is equally uncertain, although the author set it in the South, at the same latitude of Compsa and the same longitude of Aquilonia.

=== Volcanic structures ===
The most remarkable natural curiosity in the land of the Hirpini was the valley and lake, or rather pool, of Amsanctus, celebrated by Virgil in a manner that shows its fame to have been widely spread through Italy. It is remarkable as the only trace of volcanic action remaining in the central chain of the Apennines along with nearby Monte Vulture, an extinct volcano located on the eastern shore of the Ofanto River. Bolle della Malvizza, in the Miscano Valley, is a mud volcano instead.

=== Roads ===
The country of the Hirpini, despite its rugged, mountainous character, was traversed by several Roman roads, all of which connected to the Via Appia. The main line of that road went from Capua to Beneventum. There, it branched into two, one to Aeclanum, and Aquilonia, Venusia (modern Venosa), and then to Tarentum (modern Taranto). This was the proper Via Appia. The other branch, known from the time of Trajan (who first made it safe for carriages) as the Via Trajana went from Beneventum through Forum Novum (modern Buonalbergo), Aequum Tuticum (Saint Eleuterio near Ariano Irpino), Aecae in Apulia, and then through Herdonea and Canusium (modern Canosa di Puglia) to Brundusium (modern Brindisi). The course of these roads through Hirpini land has been traced with care by Mommsen. Other notable Roman roads in the territory were Via Herculia, Via Aurelia Aeclanensis and Via Aemilia in Hirpinis.
