= Alf Baccari =

Canadian ice hockey player (born 1928)

- Born: March 26, 1928 Fort William, Ontario, Canada
- Height: 5 ft 7 in (170 cm)
- Weight: 175 lb (79 kg; 12 st 7 lb)
- Position: Right wing
- Shot: Right
- Played for: St. Louis Flyers; Providence Reds
- Playing career: 1943–1965

Alfred Baccari (born March 26, 1928) is a Canadian former professional hockey player who played for the St. Louis Flyers and Providence Reds in the American Hockey League.
