= Benevento =

City in Campania, Italy; Roman Beneventum

- Comune
- Comune di Benevento
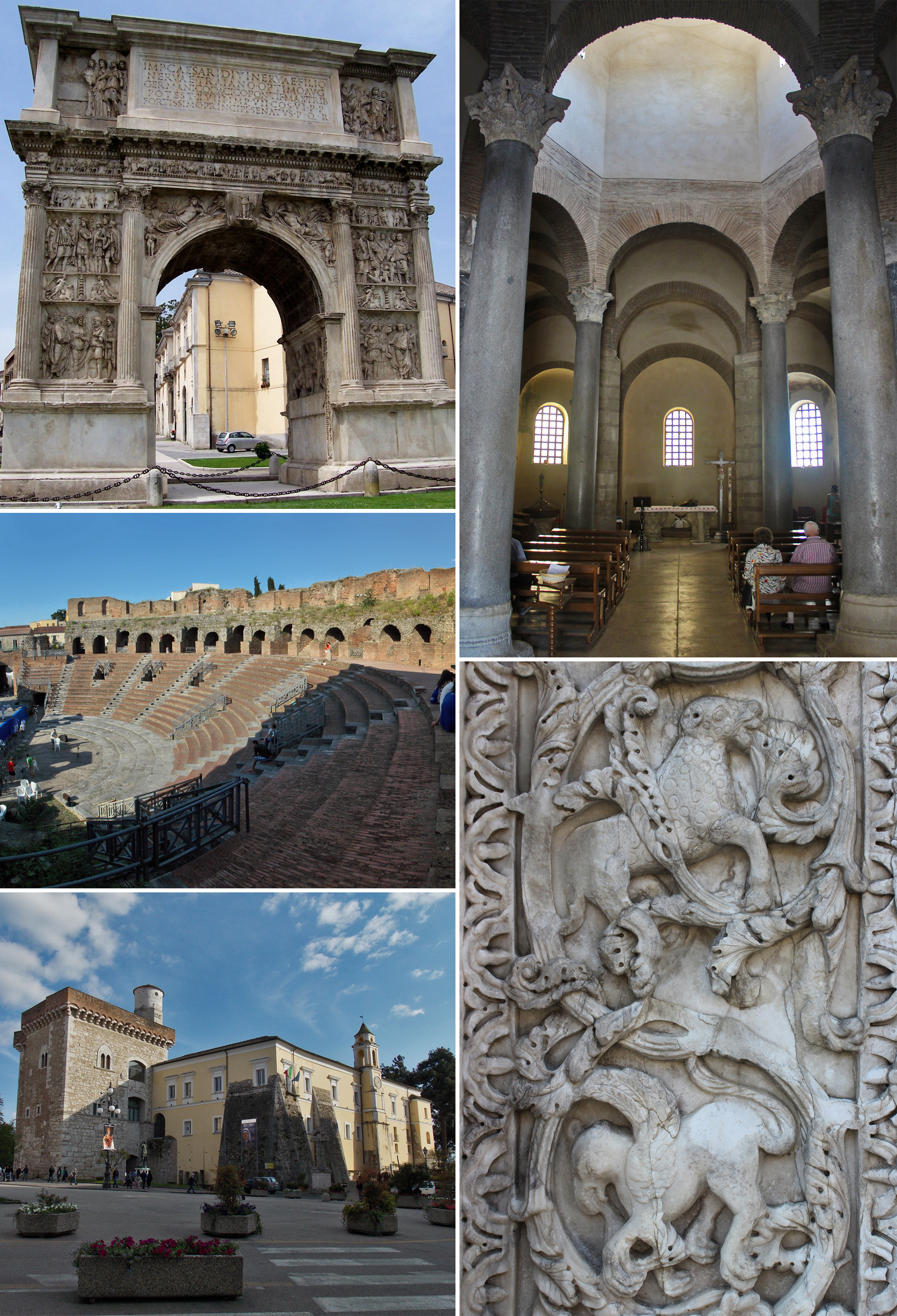
- Main landmarks in Benevento. Clockwise from the upper left: the Arch of Trajan, the church of Santa Sofia, the Cathedral's main portal, the castle and the Roman theatre

- Flag Coat of arms

- Benevento within the Province of Benevento

- Location within Campania Location within Italy Location within Europe
- Coordinates: 41°08′N 14°47′E
- Country: Italy
- Region: Campania
- Province: Benevento (BN)
- Frazioni: see list

Government
  - Mayor: Clemente Mastella

Area
  - Total: 130 km^{2} (50 sq mi)
- Elevation: 135 m (443 ft)

Population (30 June 2025)
  - Total: 55,319
  - Density: 430/km^{2} (1,100/sq mi)
- Demonym: Beneventani
- Time zone: UTC+1 (CET)
  - Summer (DST): UTC+2 (CEST)
- Postal code: 82100
- Dialing code: 0824
- ISTAT code: 062008
- Patron saint: St. Bartholomew
- Saint day: 24 August
- Website: Official website

UNESCO World Heritage Site
- Part of: Via Appia. Regina Viarum
- Criteria: Cultural: iii, iv, vi
- Reference: 1708-010
- Inscription: 2024 (46th Session)

Benevento (Italian: [beneˈvɛnto]; Beneventano: Biniviento [biniˈvjendə]) is a city and comune (municipality) of Campania, Italy, capital of the province of Benevento. It is situated on a hill 130 metres (427 feet) above sea level at the confluence of the Calore Irpino (or Beneventano) and the Sabato. As of June 30, 2025, Benevento has 55,319 inhabitants. It is also the seat of a Catholic archbishop.

Benevento occupies the site of the ancient Beneventum, originally Maleventum or even earlier Maloenton. In the imperial period, its founder was deemed to have been Diomedes after the Trojan War.

Due to its artistic and cultural significance, the Santa Sofia Church in Benevento was declared a UNESCO World Heritage Site in 2011, as part of a group of seven historic buildings inscribed as Longobards in Italy, Places of Power (568–774 A.D.).

The patron saint of Benevento is Saint Bartholomew, the Apostle, whose relics are kept at the Cattedrale di Santa Maria Assunta.

== Territorial subdivisions ==
Frazioni, or wards, include: Acquafredda, Cancelleria, Capodimonte, Caprarella, Cardoncielli, Cardoni, Cellarulo, Chiumiento, Ciancelle, Ciofani, Cretazzo, Epitaffio, Francavilla, Gran Potenza, Imperatore, Lammia, Madonna della Salute, Masseria del Ponte, Masseria La Vipera, Mascambruni, Montecalvo, Olivola, Pacevecchia, Pamparuottolo, Pantano, Perrottiello, Piano Cappelle, Pino, Ponte Corvo, Rosetiello, Ripa Zecca, Roseto, Santa Clementina, San Chirico, San Cumano (anc. Nuceriola), San Domenico, San Giovanni a Caprara, Sant'Angelo a Piesco, San Vitale, Scafa, Serretelle, Sponsilli, Torre Alfieri, and Vallereccia.

== History ==
Historical affiliations

- Samnium until 314 BC
- Roman Republic 314–27 BC
- Roman Empire 27 BC – 285 AD
- Western Roman Empire 285–476
- Kingdom of Odoacer 476–490
- Ostrogothic Kingdom 490–536
- Eastern Roman Empire 536–571
- Duchy of Benevento 571–1077
- Papal States 1077–1799
- Roman Republic (1798-1799) 1798–1799
- Papal States 1799–1806
- Principality of Benevento 1806–1815
- Papal States 1815–1860
- Kingdom of Sardinia 1860–1861
- Kingdom of Italy 1861–1946
- Italian Republic 1946–present

=== Ancient era ===
Benevento, as Maleventum, was one of the chief cities of Samnium, situated on the Appian Way at a distance of 51 kilometres (32 mi) east of Capua on the banks of the river Calor (now Calore). There is some discrepancy as to the tribe to which it belonged at contact: Pliny the Elder expressly assigns it to the Hirpini, while Livy's wording is somewhat obscure and Ptolemy considers the town as belonging to the Samnites proper, as distinguished from the Hirpini. All ancient writers concur in representing it as a very ancient city, with Gaius Julius Solinus and Stephanus of Byzantium ascribing its foundation to Diomedes — this legend appears to have been adopted by the city's inhabitants, who in the time of Procopius pretended to exhibit the tusks of the Calydonian Boar as proof of their descent. Sextus Pompeius Festus, on the contrary (s. v. Ausoniam), related that the city was founded by Auson, a son of Ulysses and Circe, a tradition which indicates that it was an ancient Ausonian city prior to its conquest by the Samnites. It first appears in history as a Samnite city, and must have already been a place of strength as the Romans did not venture to attack it during their first two wars with the Samnites; it appears, however, to have fallen into their hands during the Third Samnite War, though the exact occasion is unknown.

Benevento was certainly in the power of the Romans in 274 BC, when Pyrrhus of Epirus was defeated in a great battle, fought in its immediate neighborhood, by the consul Manius Curius Dentatus. Six years later (268 BC) they further sought to secure its possession by establishing there a Roman colony with Latin rights. It was at this time that it first assumed the name of Beneventum (good wind in latin), having previously been called Maleventum (bad wind in latin), a name which the Romans regarded as of evil augury, and changed into one of a more fortunate signification. It is probable that the Oscan or Samnite name was Maloeis, or Malieis (Μαλιείς in Ancient Greek), whence the form Maleventum would derive, like Agrigentum from Acragas (now Agrigento), Selinuntium from Selinus (the ruins of which are at now Selinunte), etc.

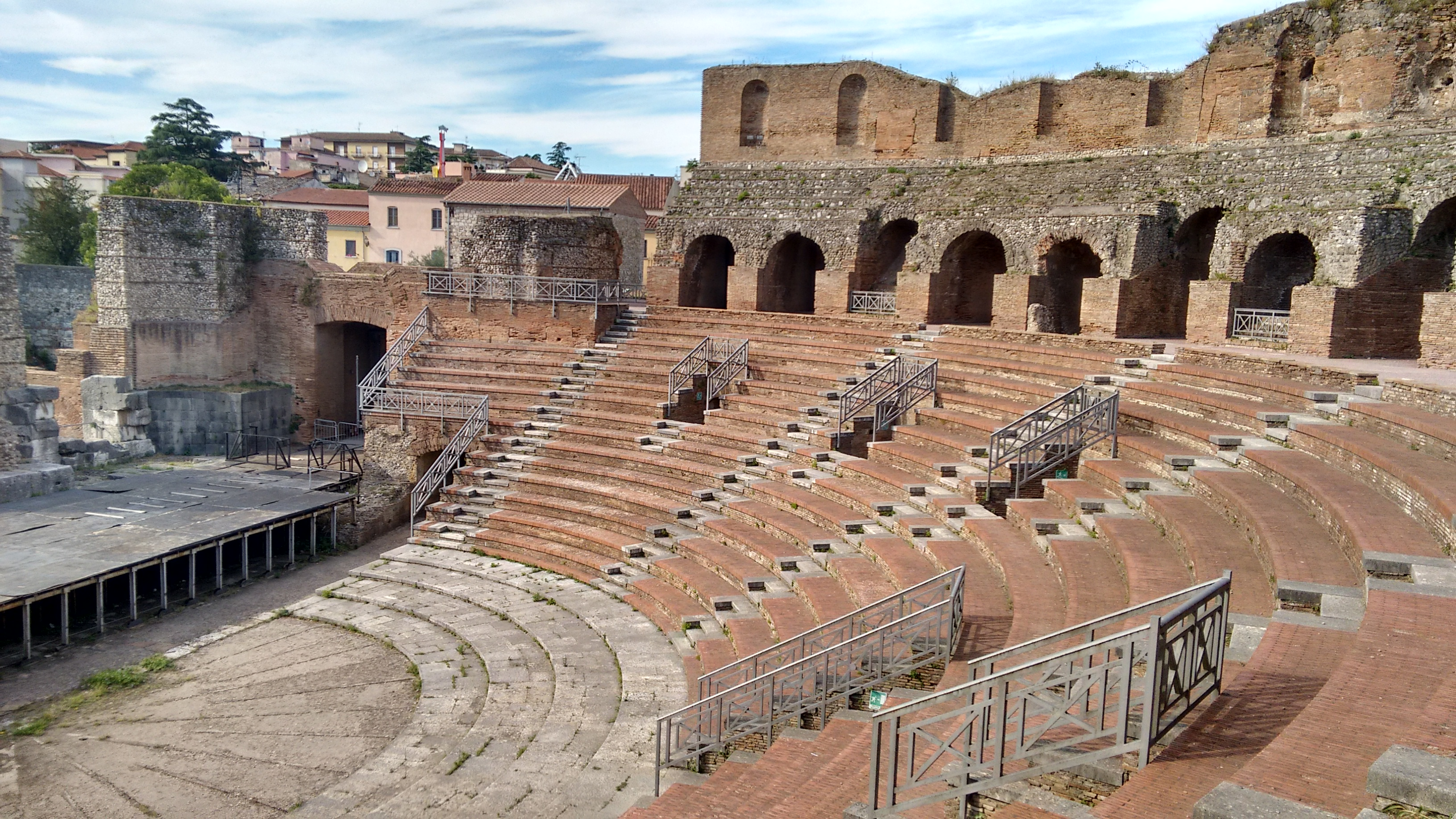
View of the Roman Theatre of Benevento

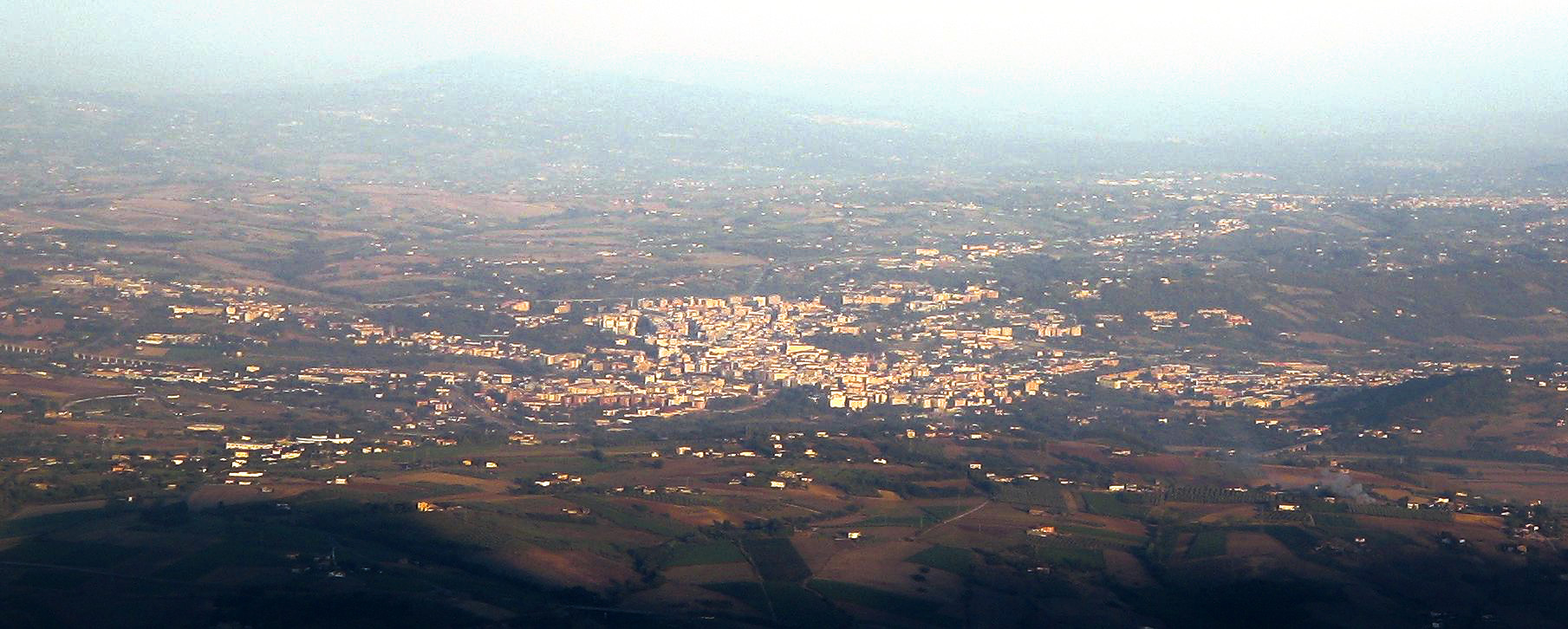
Panoramic view of Benevento from the mount Pentime, part of the Taburno Camposauro

As a Roman colony Beneventum seems to have quickly become a flourishing place; and in the Second Punic War was repeatedly occupied by Roman generals as a post of importance, on account of its proximity to Campania, and its strength as a fortress. In its immediate neighborhood were fought two of the most decisive actions of the war: the Battle of Beneventum (214 BC), in which the Carthaginian general Hanno was defeated by Tiberius Gracchus; the other in 212 BC, when the camp of Hanno, in which he had accumulated a vast quantity of corn and other stores, was stormed and taken by the Roman consul Quintus Fulvius Flaccus. And though its territory was more than once laid waste by the Carthaginians, it was still one of the eighteen Latin colonies which in 209 BCE were at once able and willing to furnish the required quota of men and money for continuing the war. No mention of it occurs during the Social War, although it seems to have escaped from the calamities which at that time befell so many cities of Samnium; towards the close of the Roman Republic Benevento is described as one of the most opulent and flourishing cities of Italy.

Under the Second Triumvirate its territory was portioned out by the Triumvirs to their veterans, and subsequently a fresh colony was established there by Augustus, who greatly enlarged its domain by the addition of the territory of Caudium (now Montesarchio). A third colony was settled there by Nero, at which time it assumed the title of Concordia; hence we find it bearing, in inscriptions of the reign of Septimius Severus, the titles Colonia Julia Augusta Concordia Felix Beneventum. Its importance and flourishing condition under the Roman Empire is sufficiently attested by existing remains and inscriptions; it was at that period unquestionably the chief city of the Hirpini, and probably, next to Capua, the most populous and considerable city of southern Italy. For this prosperity it was doubtless indebted in part to its position on the Via Appia, just at the junction of the two principal arms or branches of that great road, the one called afterwards the Via Traiana, leading thence by Aequum Tuticum (now Ariano Irpino) into Apulia; the other by Aeclanum to Venusia (now Venosa) and Tarentum (now Taranto). Its wealth is also evidenced by the quantity of coins minted by Beneventum. Horace famously notes Beneventum on his journey from Rome to Brundusium (now Brindisi). It was indebted to the same circumstance for the honor of repeated visits from the emperors of Rome, among which those of Nero, Trajan, and Septimus Severus, are particularly recorded.

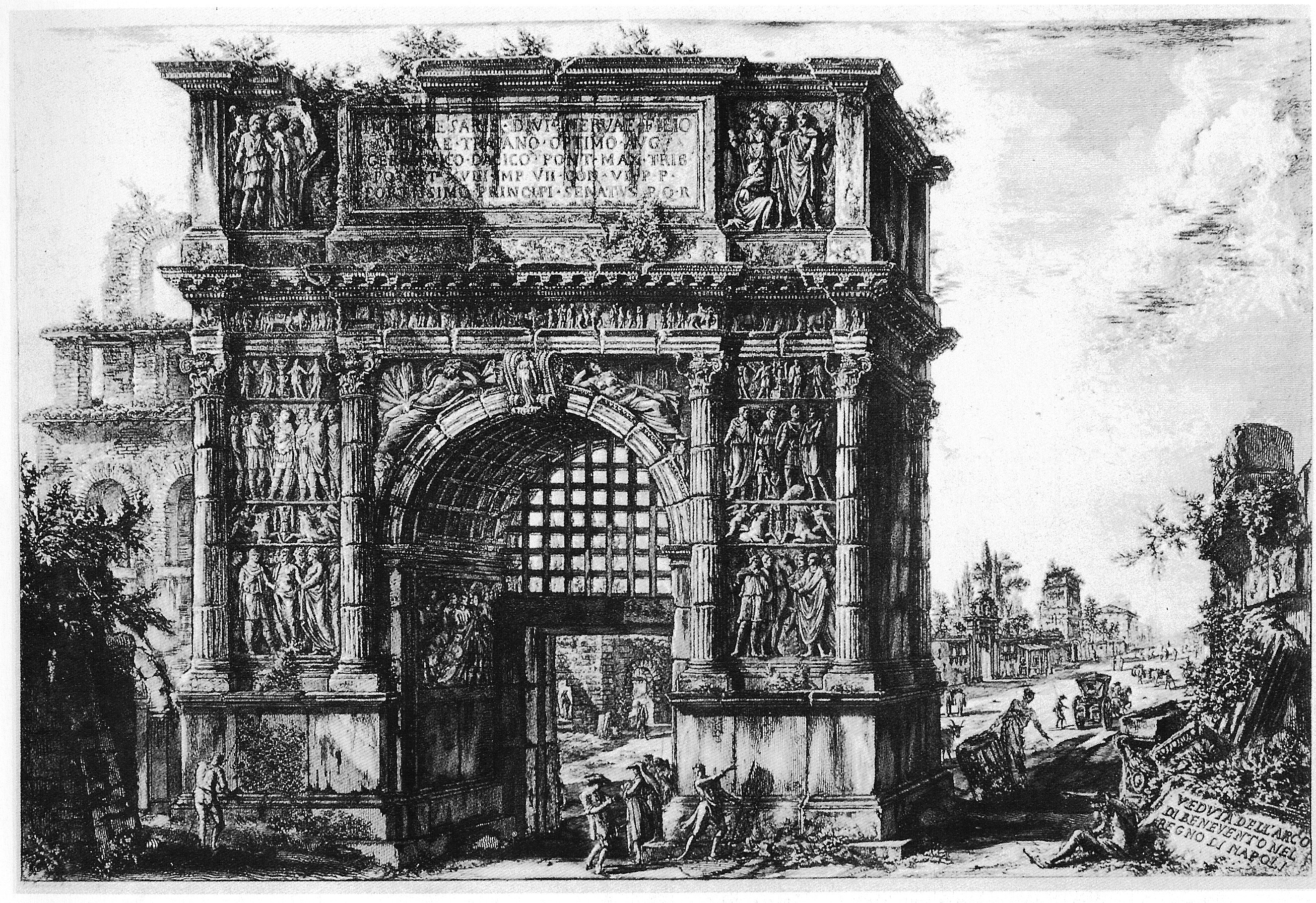
The Arch of Trajan, provided with a portcullis, as it appeared in the 18th century, etching by Giovanni Battista Piranesi. Some of the bas-reliefs are now in the British Museum.

It was probably for the same reason that the triumphal arch, the Arch of Trajan, was erected there by the senate and people of Rome and constructed by the architect Apollodorus of Damascus in 114. The Arch of Trajan is one of the best-preserved Roman structures in the Campania. It repeats the formula of the Arch of Titus in the Roman Forum, with reliefs of Trajan's life and exploits of his reign. Some of the sculptures are in the British Museum. Successive emperors seem to have bestowed on the city accessions of territory, and erected, or at least given name to, various public buildings. For administrative purposes it was first included, together with the rest of the Hirpini, in the second region of Augustus, but was afterwards annexed to Campania and placed under the control of the consular of that province. Its inhabitants were included in the Stellatine tribe. Beneventum retained its importance down to the close of the Empire, and though during the Gothic wars it was taken by Totila, and its walls razed to the ground, they were restored, as well as its public buildings, shortly after; and P. Diaconus speaks of it as a very wealthy city, and the capital of all the surrounding provinces.

Beneventum indeed seems to have been a place of much literary cultivation; it was the birthplace of Lucius Orbilius Pupillus, who long continued to teach in his native city before he removed to Rome, and was honored with a statue by his fellow-townsmen; while existing inscriptions record similar honors paid to another grammarian, Rutilius Aelianus, as well as to orators and poets, apparently only of local celebrity.

The territory of Beneventum under the Roman Empire was of very considerable extent. Towards the west it included that of Caudium, with the exception of the town itself; to the north it extended as far as the river Tamarus (now Tammaro), including the village of Pago Veiano, which, as we learn from an inscription, was anciently called Pagus Veianus; on the northeast it comprised the town of Aequum Tuticum (now Saint Eleutherio hamlet, between Ariano Irpino and Castelfranco in Miscano), and on the east and south bordered on the territories of Aeclanum (now Mirabella Eclano) and Abellinum (now Avellino). An inscription has preserved to us the names of several of the pagi or villages dependent upon Beneventum, but their sites cannot be identified.

The city's most ancient coins bear the legend "Malies" or "Maliesa", which have been supposed to belong to the Samnite, or pre-Samnite, Maleventum. Coins with the legend "BENVENTOD" (an old Latin – or Samnite – form for Beneventor-um), must have been struck after it became a Latin colony.

=== Duchy of Benevento ===
Not long after it had been sacked by Totila and its walls razed (545), Benevento became the seat of a powerful Lombard duchy. The circumstances of the creation of duchy of Benevento are disputed. Lombards were present in southern Italy well before the complete conquest of the Po Valley: the duchy would have been founded in 576 by some soldiers led by Zotto, autonomously from the Lombard king.

The Principality of Benevento as it appeared in 1000 AD

Zotto's successor was Arechis I (died in 640), from the Duchy of Friuli, who captured Capua and Crotone, sacked the Byzantine Amalfi but was unable to capture Naples. After his reign the Eastern Roman Empire had only Naples, Amalfi, Gaeta, Sorrento, the tip of Calabria and the maritime cities of Apulia left in southern Italy.

In the following decades, Benevento added some territories to the Roman-Byzantine duchy by conquest, but the main enemy was now the northern Lombard Kingdom itself. King Liutprand intervened several times, imposing a candidate of his own to the realm's succession; his successor Ratchis declared the duchies of Spoleto and Benevento to be foreign countries where it was forbidden to travel without royal permission.

With the collapse of the Lombard Kingdom in 773, Duke Arechis II was elevated to Prince under the new Frankish Empire, in compensation for having some of his territory transferred back to the Papal States.

In November 774, the Duke of Benevento Duke Arechis II, immediately after being crowned prince, decided to send members of the Benevento Cortisani and Baccari families to occupy the central area of the Biferno river in the neighboring region of Molise, seeking to expand their political dominance.

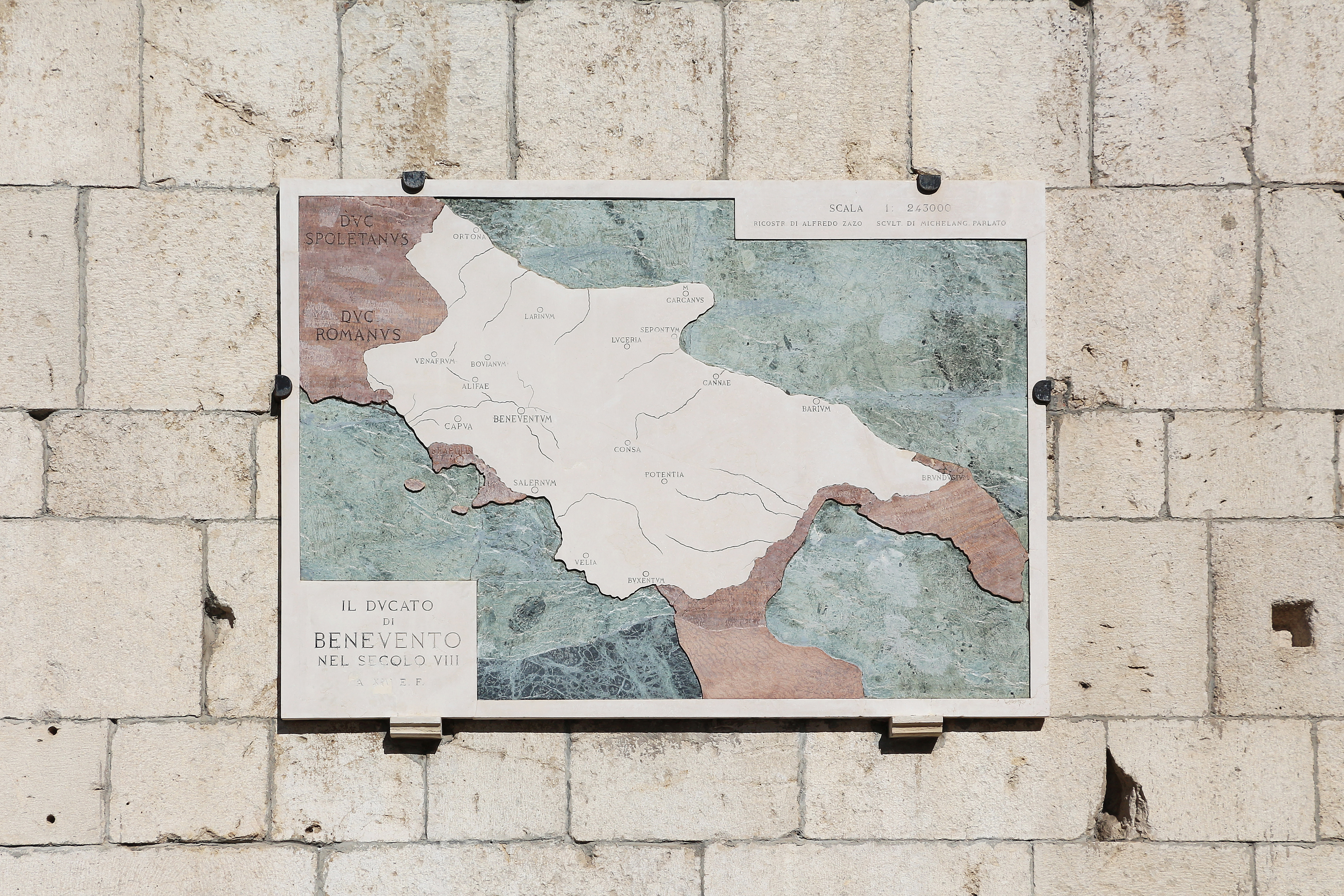
Map of Duchy of Benevento on the church tower of Santa Sofia

Benevento was acclaimed by a chronicler as a "second Pavia"—Ticinum geminum—after the Lombard capital was lost. This principality was short-lived: in 851, Salerno broke off under Siconulf and, by the end of that century, Capua was independent as well. Benevento was ruled again by the Byzantines between 891 and 895.

The so-called Langobardia minor was unified for the last time by Duke Pandolfo Testa di Ferro, who expanded his extensive control in the Mezzogiorno from his base in Benevento and Capua. Before his death (March 981), he had also gained the title of Duke of Spoleto from Emperor Otto I. However, both Benevento and Salerno rebelled to his son and heir, Pandulf II.

The first decades of the 11th century saw two more German-descended rulers in southern Italy: Henry II, conquered in 1022 both Capua and Benevento, but returned after the failed siege of Troia. Conrad II obtained similar results in 1038. In these years the three states (Benevento, Capua, and Salerno) were often engaged in local wars and disputes that favoured the rise of the Normans from mercenaries to ruler of the whole of Southern Italy. The greatest of them was Robert Guiscard, who captured Benevento in 1053 after the Emperor Henry III had first authorised its conquest in 1047 when Pandulf III and Landulf VI shut the gates to him. These princes were later expelled from the city and then recalled after the pope failed to defend it from Guiscard. The city fell to Normans in 1077. It was a papal city until after 1081.

=== Papal rule ===
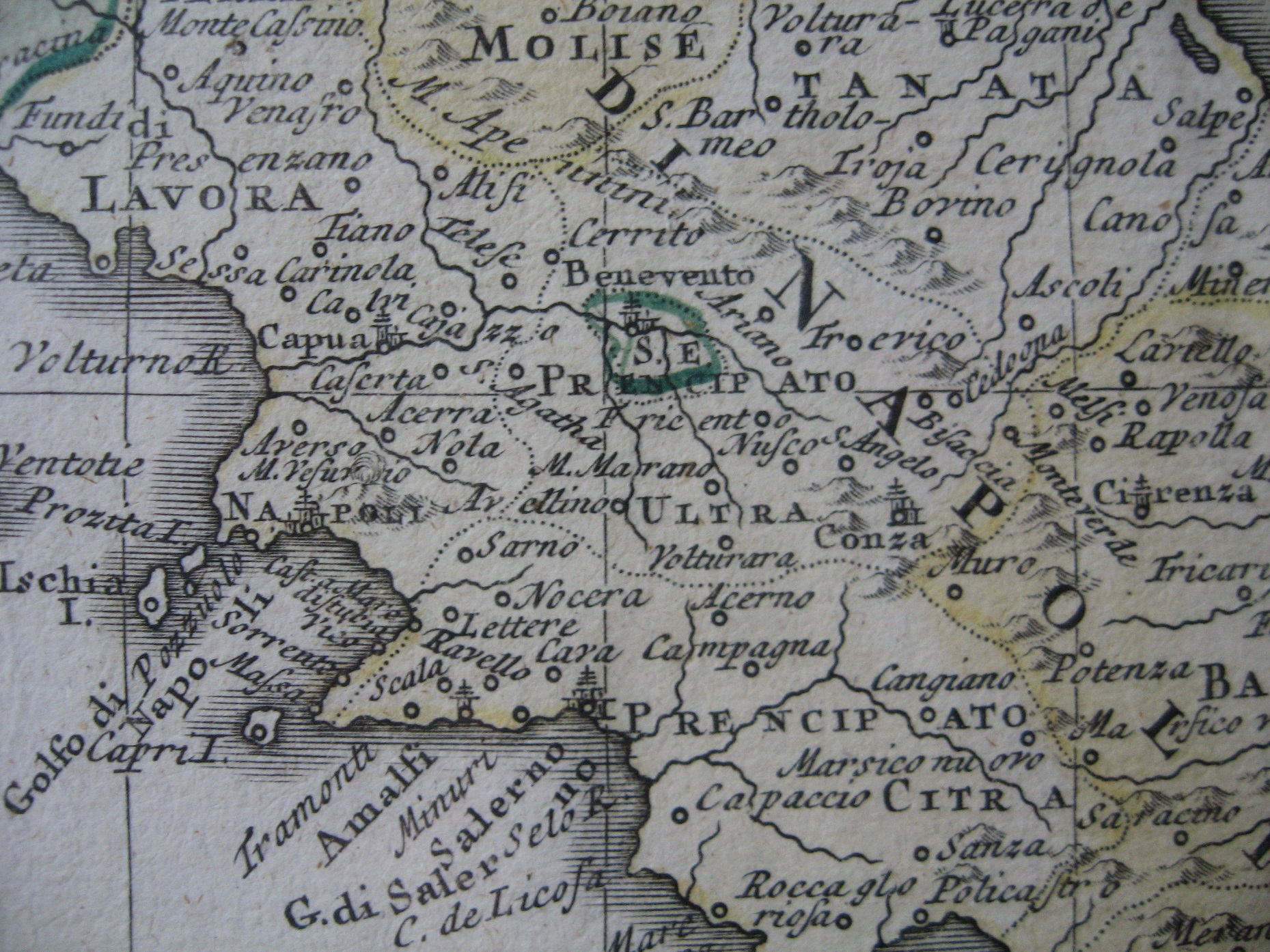
Papal Benevento on an 18th-century map

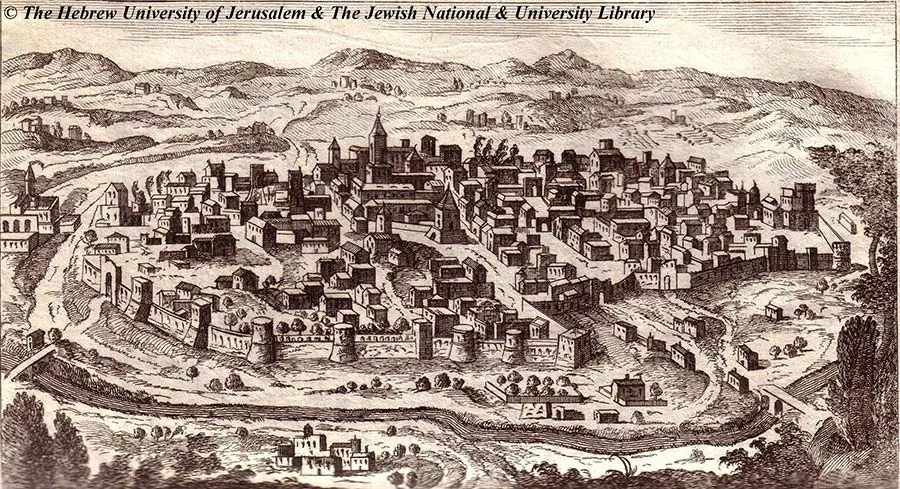
Benevento on medieval lithography

Benevento passed to the papacy peacefully when the emperor Henry III ceded it to Leo IX, in exchange for the pope's consent to the establishment of the Diocese of Bamberg (1053). Landulf II, Archbishop of Benevento, promoted reform, but also allied with the Normans. He was deposed for two years. Benevento was the cornerstone of the papacy's temporal powers in southern Italy. The papacy ruled it by appointed rectors, seated in a palace, and the principality continued to be a papal possession until 1806, when Napoleon granted it to his minister Talleyrand with the title of sovereign prince. Talleyrand was never to settle down and actually rule his new principality; in 1815 Benevento was returned to the papacy. It was united with Italy in 1860.

Several popes personally visited Benevento. In 1128 Honorius II tried inviting Roger II of Sicily into the city in order to discuss peace terms; however, Roger refused to enter the city, for he felt unsafe within the city. Thus the two instead met on a bridge near Benevento. Only a year later, the city revolted against the Papal rule and Honorius had to beg Roger for assistance.

In 1130, Anacletus II fled from Rome to the safety of Benevento after hearing that his rival Innocent II was gaining recognition in the north. When Anacletus created Roger the king of Sicily, he granted Roger the right to conscript the citizens of the city into military service, despite city itself remaining under Papal rule. The declaration was not well received, as the citizens became afraid that the city was about to be annexed into the newly found kingdom. Therefore, when Roger made his move against Robert of Capua and began the civil war, Benevento sided with Robert and ousted Anacletus's supporters from the city.

Manfred of Sicily lost his life in 1266 in battle with Charles of Anjou not far from the town, in the course of the Battle of Benevento.

==== Revolution and brief republican rule ====
In the 19th century, cultural developments in the city had caused the rise of an active bourgeoisie and contributed to the stagnation of the patrician class. This allowed liberal fervour in the Kingdom of the Two Sicilies, driven by the revolutionary organisation of the Carbonari, to spread to the region.

In the light of the 1820 unrest in the Two Sicilies, which had forced the kingdom to liberalise, the Carbonari stimulated the revolution in Benevento. The Republic of Benevento was declared in July 1820 and the progressive Spanish constitution was adopted by the new nation.

Benevento requested twice to be incorporated into the Two Sicilies, though these attempts were rejected both times as the nation refused to negotiate the affairs of Benevento except through the Pope, who they continued to recognise as sovereign over the area.

In the spring of 1821, the short-lived republic was militarily occupied by the forces of the Austrian Empire which intervened in south Italy to restore Benevento to Papal rule.

=== After the Italian unification ===
After the unification of Italy, Benevento was made provincial capital of the new Province of Benevento, comprising territories formerly belonging to the dissolved Kingdom of the Two Sicilies (Principato Ultra, Molise, Terra di Lavoro, Capitanata). In the following decades, the town saw considerable expansion and modernization; the local economy became increasingly diversified, with the traditional agricultural sector (especially the cultivation of tobacco and cereals) being joined by growing confectionery, mechanical, liquor, lumber and brickmaking industries.

During World War II, Benevento's key position in the railway communications between Rome and Apulia resulted in the town being heavily bombed by the Allied air forces in the summer of 1943. These raids caused 2,000 deaths and left 18,000 homeless out of a population of 40,000, and resulted in the destruction of half of the town. The railway and industrial districts were hit the hardest, but the old city centre also suffered heavily; the Cathedral was almost completely destroyed, and its reconstruction was only completed in the 1960s. After being briefly occupied by the Germans in the wake of the Armistice of Cassibile, Benevento was liberated by the Allies on 2 October 1943.

Four years after the war, on 2 October 1949, Benevento was hit hard by a flood of the Calore Irpino.

During the 1950s Benevento was mainly ruled by Monarchist or MSI mayors, and then for three decades (until the 1990s) by the Christian Democracy. Public sector grew considerably during this period, becoming a prime source of employment for many inhabitants of the province; the town also saw increasing demographic expansion, resulting in a somewhat incontrolled building boom. In recent years, several urban renewal projects have been carried out in the old city centre, and Benevento has become the seat of the University of Sannio and several research institutes.

=== Jewish history ===
Epigraphical evidence show that a Jewish community had existed in Benevento since at least the fifth century. In the 10th century, Jewish traveller Ahimaaz ben Paltiel described the Jewish community of Benevento, among other southern Italy towns. One of Paltiel's relatives established a Yeshiva in town, and a large part of his family resided in Benevento. In 1065, prince Landulf IV of Benevento forced a number of Jews to convert to Christianity, which was censured by Pope Alexander II. Jewish traveller Benjamin of Tudela, who visited Benevento in 1159 or 1165, described 200 Jewish families living in the city. Being under Papal rule (unlike the rest of southern Italy), the Jewish community of Benevento was not expelled, as most other southern Italy Jewish communities in 1541. Nevertheless, they were expelled from town later in 1569 under Pope Paul IV. In 1617 the Jewish community was given permission to resettle, though were expelled again 13 years later after being accused of well poisoning. There has been no organized Jewish community in Benevento since the expellation. However, an unorganized Jewish community has persisted. In recent years, a few Israeli Jews have faced occasional anti-semitic incidents.

== Geography ==
=== Climate ===
According to the Köppen climate classification, Benevento has a hot-summer Mediterranean climate (Csa).

Climate data for Benevento (2000–2020)
Month	Jan	Feb	Mar	Apr	May	Jun	Jul	Aug	Sep	Oct	Nov	Dec	Year
Mean daily maximum °C (°F)	11.3 (52.3)	12.7 (54.9)	16.0 (60.8)	20.2 (68.4)	24.4 (75.9)	29.2 (84.6)	32.2 (90.0)	32.6 (90.7)	27.1 (80.8)	22.7 (72.9)	17.0 (62.6)	12.4 (54.3)	21.5 (70.7)
Daily mean °C (°F)	6.5 (43.7)	7.4 (45.3)	10.2 (50.4)	13.5 (56.3)	17.5 (63.5)	21.8 (71.2)	24.2 (75.6)	24.5 (76.1)	20.2 (68.4)	16.2 (61.2)	11.7 (53.1)	7.5 (45.5)	15.1 (59.2)
Mean daily minimum °C (°F)	1.6 (34.9)	2.0 (35.6)	4.3 (39.7)	6.9 (44.4)	10.6 (51.1)	14.3 (57.7)	16.3 (61.3)	16.5 (61.7)	13.3 (55.9)	9.8 (49.6)	6.4 (43.5)	2.5 (36.5)	8.7 (47.7)
Average precipitation mm (inches)	85 (3.3)	80 (3.1)	80 (3.1)	45 (1.8)	75 (3.0)	45 (1.8)	40 (1.6)	40 (1.6)	50 (2.0)	95 (3.7)	110 (4.3)	75 (3.0)	820 (32.3)
Source: Climi e viaggi

== Demographics ==
Historical population

Year	Pop.	±%
1861	19,222	—
1871	20,339	+5.8%
1881	21,359	+5.0%
1901	24,137	+13.0%
1911	23,767	−1.5%
1921	26,790	+12.7%
1931	36,054	+34.6%
1936	37,865	+5.0%

Year	Pop.	±%
1951	47,604	+25.7%
1961	55,381	+16.3%
1971	59,009	+6.6%
1981	62,636	+6.1%
1991	62,561	−0.1%
2001	61,791	−1.2%
2011	61,489	−0.5%
2021	56,916	−7.4%

Source: ISTAT

== Main sights ==
=== Ancient remains ===
The Arch of Trajan

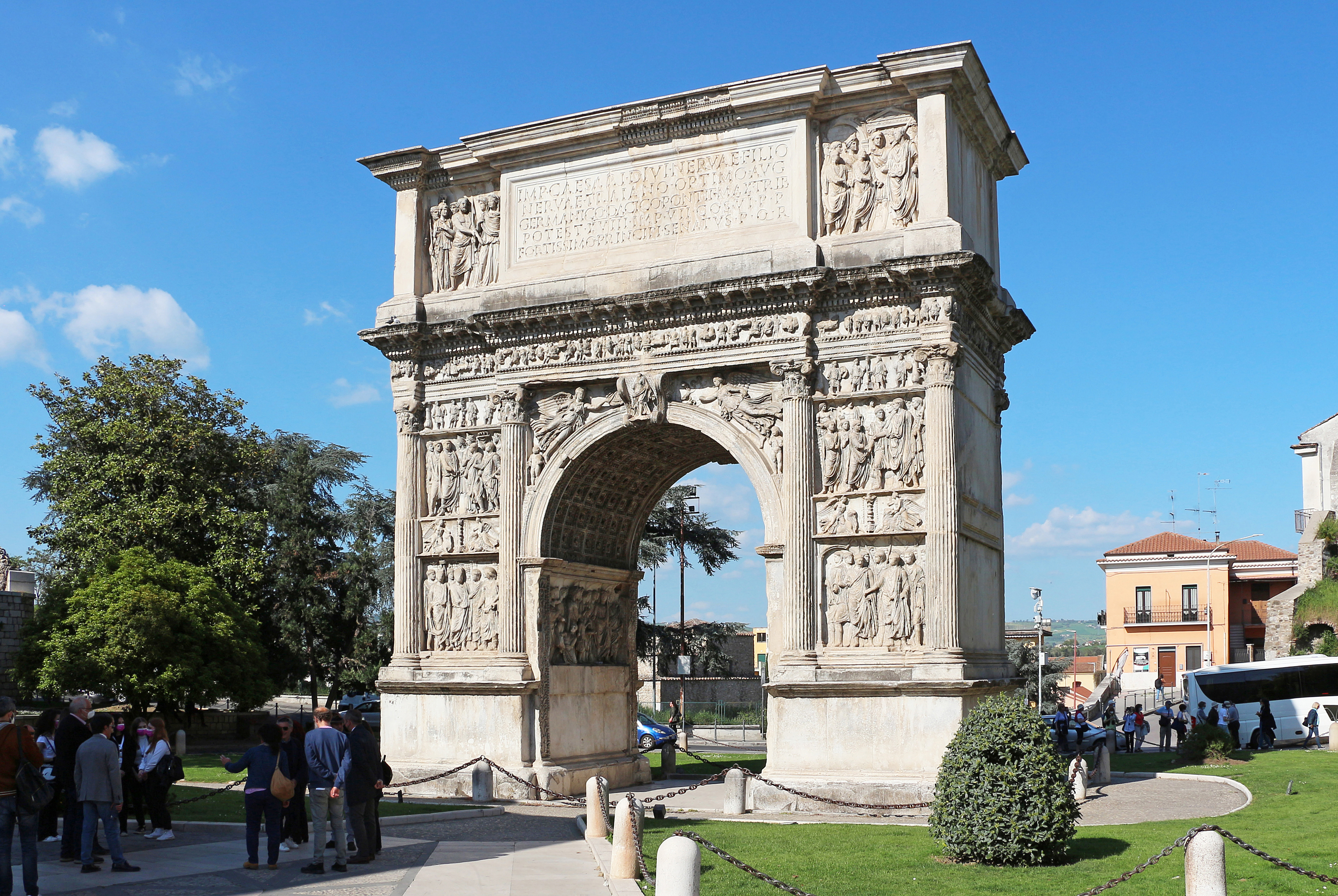
Arch of Trajan

The importance of Benevento in classical times is vouched for by the many remains of antiquity which it possesses, of which the most famous is the triumphal arch erected in honour of Trajan by the senate and people of Rome in 114, with important reliefs relating to its history. Enclosed in the walls, this construction marked the entrance in Benevento of the Via Traiana, the road built by the Spanish emperor to shorten the path from Rome to Brindisi. The reliefs show the civil and military deeds of Trajan. A great part of the arch is decorated with scenes in bas relief: particularly the pillars directed to the town represent scenes of peace and military scenes. The two faces of the Arch are identical in the arrangement of the reliefs. That the reliefs are for the most part not merely fanciful, nor chiefly conventional and decorative in theme and treatment, is also clear at first sight. They plainly refer to actual events and actions in the life of Trajan, whose effigy, sometimes decapitated, appears in all but two of them, one of which is the only one on all the Arch that is substantially defective. The height of the monument is of 15.6 metres (51 ft), with an arch of 8 m (26 ft), a structure composed of limestone rocks and a marble covering. The arch was put during the Middle Age in the fenced area of the town, in order to represent the Porta Aurea, on account of its fair proportions and the wealth and excellence of its sculptural adornments.

Other considerable remains

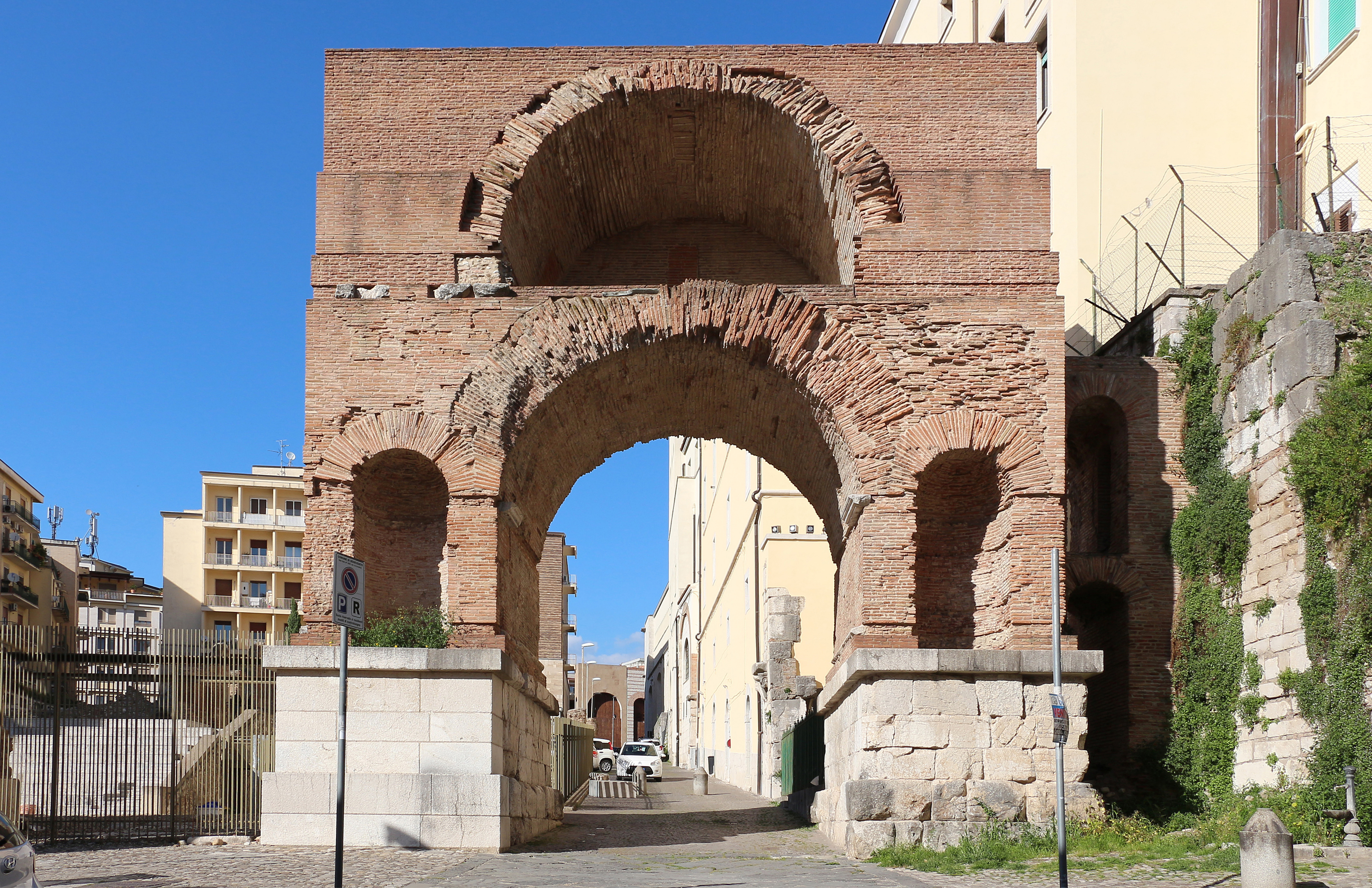
Arch of the Sacrament

There are other considerable remains from ancient era:

- The well-preserved ancient theatre, next to the Cathedral and the Port'Arsa gate. This grandiose building was erected by Hadrian, and later expanded by Caracalla. It is a testimony of the presence of different Hellenic tendencies, in opposition to the previous art of Traiano. The theater, oriented toward the Taburno, has a diameter of 90 m (300 ft) and could house up to 10,000 spectators; it was covered with polychrome marble decorated with plaster and mosaics. During the 18th century on one extremity of the hemicycle was built the church of Santa Maria della Verità. The archaeologist Almerico Meomartini at the end of the 19th century promised the restoration but the works ended only in 1957; from that moment the theater is used for theater, dance, and opera performances. But has been lost a part of the marble cover; until today have survived the cavea, the scenery and the first two arches.
- A large cryptoporticus 60 m (200 ft) long, known as the ruins of Santi Quaranta, and probably an emporium. According to Meomartini, the portion preserved is only a fraction of the whole, which once measured 520 m (1,710 ft) in length.
- A brick arch called Arco del Sacramento.
- The Ponte Leproso, a bridge on the Via Appia over the Sabato river, below the city center.
- Thermae along the road to Avellino.
- The Bue Apis, popularly known as Aufara ("buffalo"). It is a basement in the shape of an ox or bull coming from the Temple of Isis.

Many inscriptions and ancient fragments may be seen built into the old houses. In 1903 the foundations of the Temple of Isis were discovered close to the Arch of Trajan, and many fragments of fine sculptures in both the Egyptian and the Greco-Roman style belonging to it were found. They had apparently been used as the foundation of a portion of the city wall, reconstructed in 663 under the fear of an attack by the Byzantine emperor Constans II, the temple having been destroyed by order of the bishop, St Barbatus, to provide the necessary material (A. Meomartini, 0. Marucchi and L. Savignoni in Notizie degli Scavi, 1904, 107 sqq.).

=== Santa Sofia ===
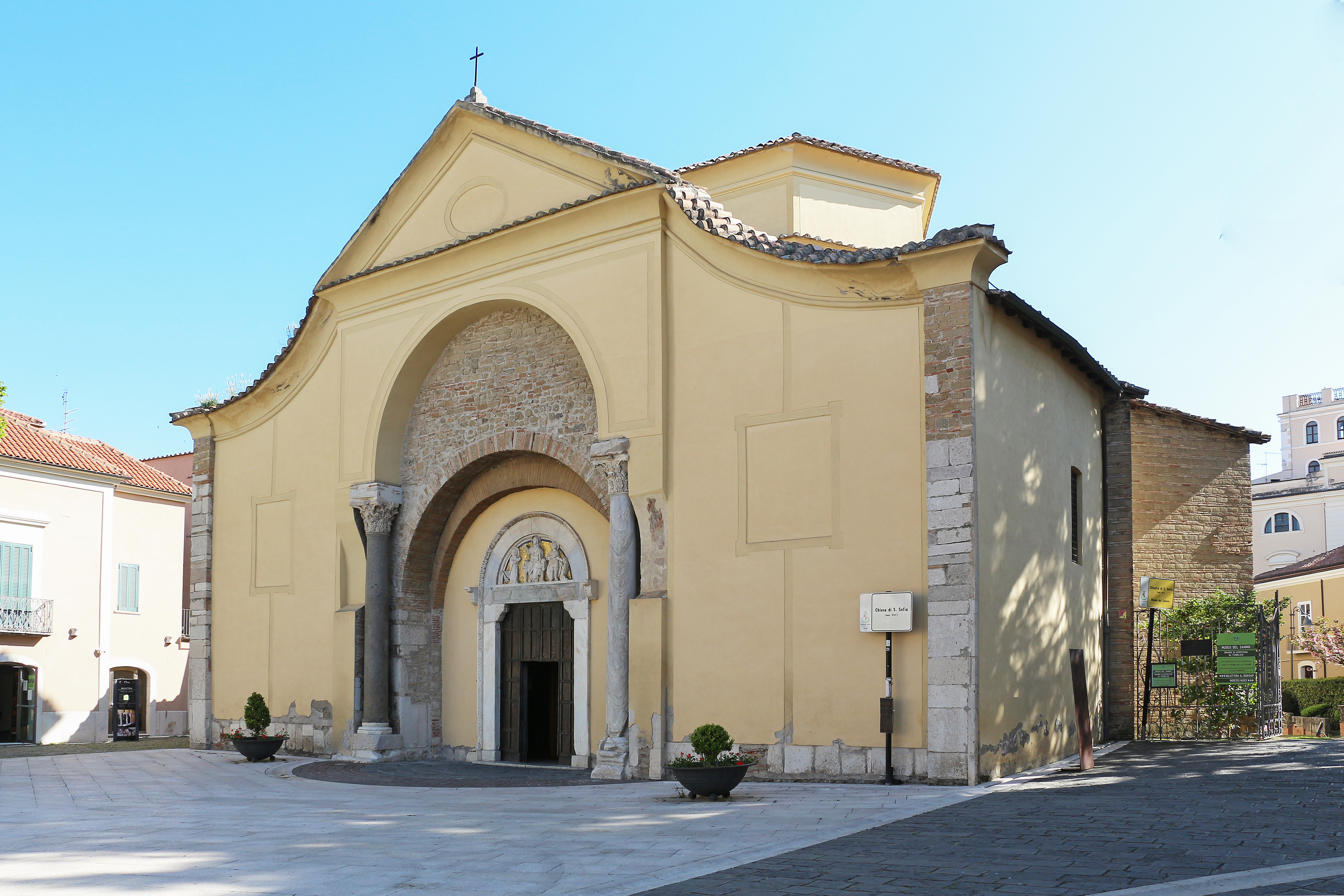
The church of Santa Sofia

The church of Santa Sofia is a circular Lombard edifice dating to c. 760, now modernized, of small proportions, and is one of the main examples of religious Lombard architecture. The plan consists of a central hexagon with, at each vertex, columns taken from the temple of Isis; these are connected by arches which support the cupola. The inner hexagon is in turn enclosed in a decagonal ring with eight white limestone pillars and two columns next to the entrance. The church has a fine cloister of the 12th century, constructed in part of fragments of earlier buildings. This cloister today is the location of the Museo del Sannio. The church interior was once totally frescoed by Byzantine artists: fragments of these paintings, portraying the Histories of Christ, can be still seen in the two side apses.

Santa Sofia was almost destroyed by the earthquake of 1688, and rebuilt in Baroque forms by commission of the then cardinal Orsini of Benevento (later Pope Benedict XIII). The original forms were hidden, and were recovered only after the discussed restoration of 1951.

In 2011, it became a UNESCO World Heritage Site as part of a group of seven inscribed as Longobards in Italy, Places of Power (568-774 A.D.).

=== The Cathedral ===
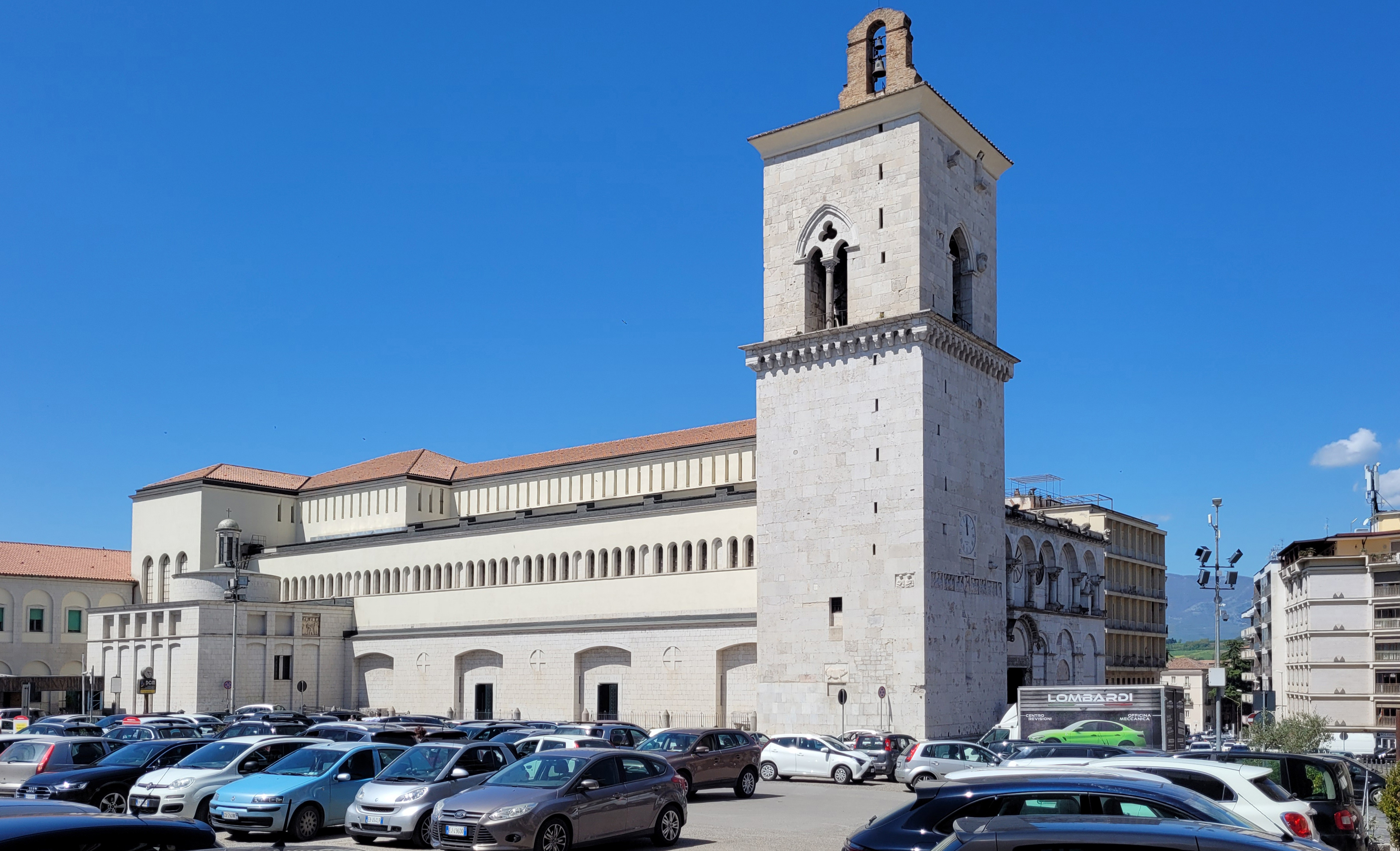
The cathedral

The Cathedral of Santa Maria Assunta, with its arcaded façade and incomplete square campanile (begun in 1279 by the archbishop Romano Capodiferro) dates from the 9th century. It was rebuilt in 1114, the façade inspired by the Pisan Gothic style. Its bronze doors, adorned with bas-reliefs, are notable example of Romanesque art which may belong to the beginning of the 13th century. The interior is in the form of a basilica, the double aisles carried on ancient columns. There are ambones resting on columns supported by lions, and decorated with reliefs and coloured marble mosaic, and a candelabrum of 1311. A marble statue of the apostle San Bartolomeo, by Nicola da Monteforte, is also from the 14th century. The cathedral also contains a statue of St. Giuseppe Moscati, a native of the area. The cathedral was completely destroyed in 1943 because of bombardments: what remained of the cathedral were just the bell tower, the façade and the crypt. Another testimony of the cathedral is the XII century bronze door, the Janua Major, composed of 72 tiles with bas relief, whose fragments were rebuilt after the Second World War. The current monument, with its modern aspect, was completed in 1965 and restored between 2005 and 2012.

=== Rocca dei Rettori ===
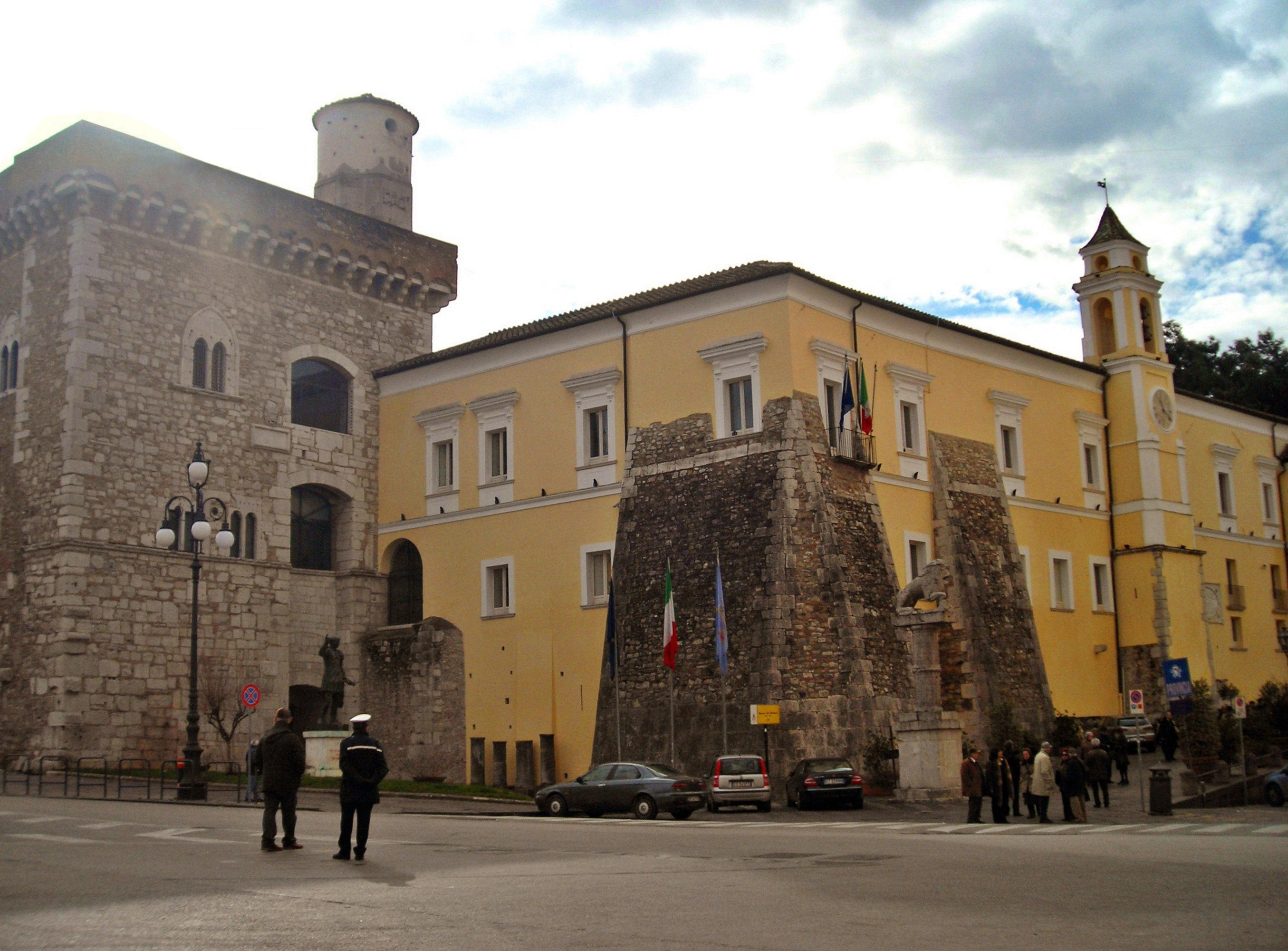
Rocca dei Rettori

The castle of Benevento, best known as Rocca dei Rettori or Rocca di Manfredi, stands at the highest point of the town, commanding the valley of the rivers Sabato and Calore, and the two main ancient roads Via Appia and Via Traiana. The site had been already used by the Samnites, who had constructed here a set of defensive terraces, and the Romans, with a thermal plant (Castellum aquae), whose remains can be still seen in the castle garden. The Benedictines had a monastery there. It received the current name in the Middle Ages, when it became the seat of the Papal governors, the Rettori.

The castle is in fact made by two distinct edifices: the Torrione ("Big Tower"), which was built by the Lombards starting from 871, and the Palazzo dei Governatori, built by the Popes from 1320.

=== Other sights ===
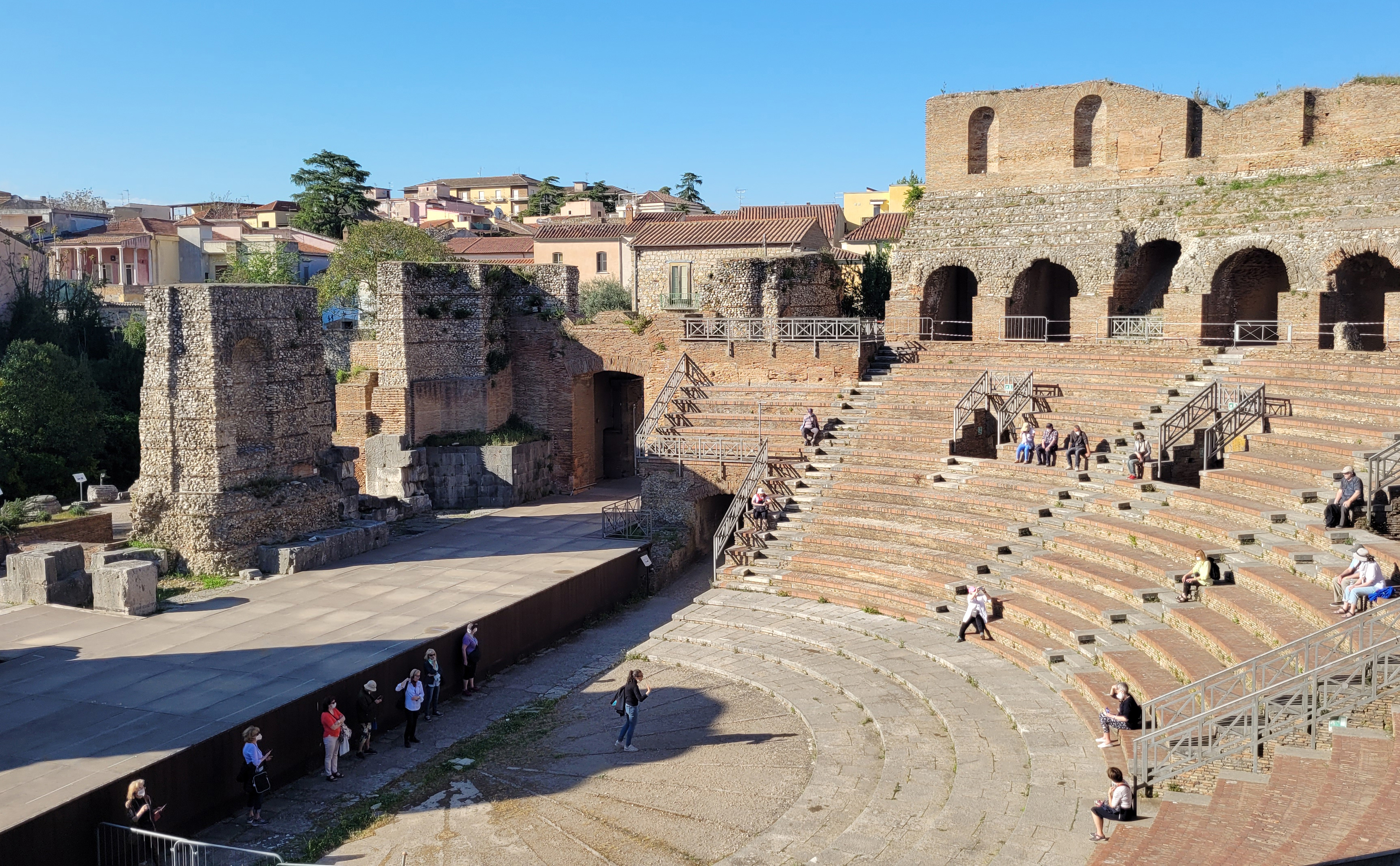
The Roman theatre

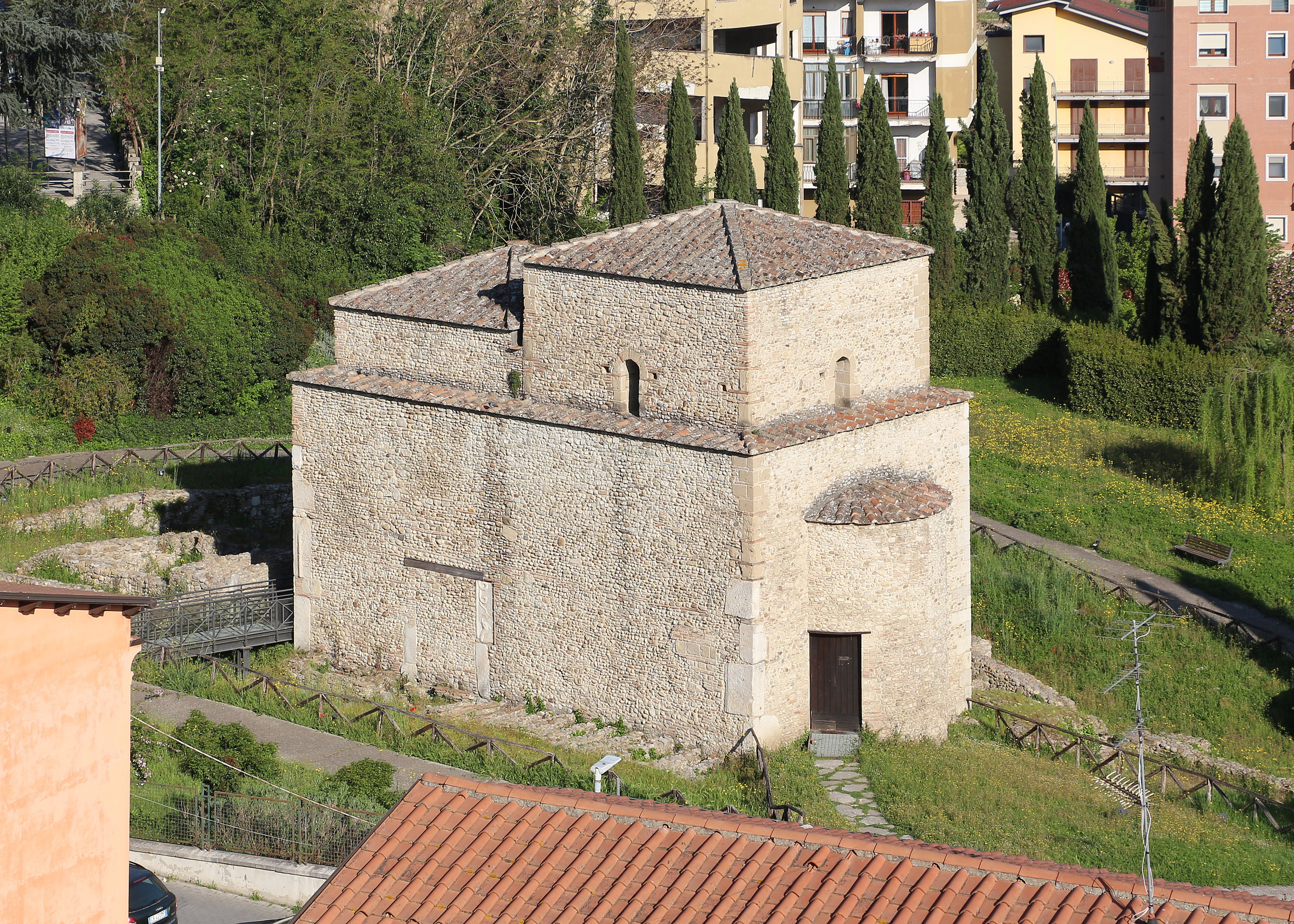
Chiesa di Sant'Ilario a Port' Aurea

- Roman theatre: begun during Hadrian's rule, completed under Caracalla between 200 and 210 A.D. The theater reflects the town's increasing importance after the opening of the Via Appia Traiana. It was located in the western sector of the ancient city, near the forum, and houses built atop the ruins aided in its conservation. Excavated and restored after the second world war, the original three-storey theater could house 20,000 people. Currently only the lower order of the building remains: the arches of the facade communicate with the interior through a series of corridors alternating with stairs.
- Sant'Ilario Church documented in the 12th-century Ecclesia Vocabolo Sancti Ylari", but excavations date part of the structure to 7th or 8th century. It is called Sant'Ilario a Port'Aurea, as it is built near the Arch of Trajan. The rectangular layout was erected on an artificial embankment. In late antiquity, the entire complex was abandoned. The church is composed of an apsed hall. The cover of the outside is formed by two separate tiburi. A monastery was once attached to the church. Devastated by the earthquake of 1688, in 1712 it was deconsecrated and used as a farmhouse. The restoration of the entire building was carried out in 2000.
- Palazzo di Paolo V (16th century).
- San Salvatore: Church dating from the High Middle Ages.
- San Francesco alla Dogana: Gothic-style church located north-east of Piazza del Duomo, incorporated between alleys and palaces in the heart of the historic center, there is Piazza Dogana with the church and convent of San Francesco. Here stood the papal customs, through which the goods passed and were taxed. The thirteenth-century church of San Francesco, that stands in the center of the square, is linked to the coming of the saint in the city, in 1222. It was built by incorporating the ancient church of San Costanzo, which in 1243 was donated to the religious from lords Stampalupo, Del Giudice and Cantalupo. After the earthquake of 1702, the architects Fontana rebuilt the high altar, which Archbishop Vincenzo Maria Orsini consecrated to the Immaculate Virgin. The facade is very simple, the interior, Gothic style, with a single nave with wooden ceiling. The apse has some frescoes and the church is flanked by two cloisters.
- Annunziata: A church at the site existed prior to 1500s, but entirely rebuilt in Baroque-style after the 1688 earthquake. The church has a single nave with three side chapels on each side.
  - San Bartolomeo: Baroque church dedicated to the patron apostle of the city. It was rebuilt after the 1688 and 1702 earthquakes, the prior basilica of San Bartolomeo had stood in the area of Piazza Orsini, adjacent to the cathedral. In 1705, a large baroque fountain was built at the prior site, but destroyed by bombings in 1943. The new basilica, located along Corso Garibaldi, was built between 1726 and 1729 and consecrated by Pope Benedict XIII. The present church, although partially using a primitive project by Fra Tommaso di Sangiovanni (prior of San Diodato), is in fact the work of Raguzzini to whom we owe not only some substantial planovolumetric modifications, but also the elegant stucco decorations and the two-tiered front overlapping on high plinth.
  - San Filippo: Baroque church

== Economy ==
The economy of Benevento area is traditionally agricultural. Main products include vine, olives and tobacco. The main industry is that of food processing (sweets and pasta), although textile, mechanics, and construction companies are present.

== Sports ==
The Stadio Ciro Vigorito is a multi-use stadium in Benevento, which is mostly used as the home venue of Serie C side Benevento Calcio.

== Transportation ==
Benevento is connected to Naples through the modern SS7 Appia state road, and then local roads starting from Arienzo. It is 17 kilometres (11 miles) from the Naples–Bari A16 motorway. The SS372 Telesina state road allows reaching the A1 Naples–Rome, leading to the latter in less than three hours.

Benevento railway station, on the Caserta-Foggia railway, has fast connections from Rome to Avellino, Bari and Lecce. Trains to Campobasso have been mostly replaced by bus services. The connection to Naples is ensured by three stations on the EAV inter-urban railway line.

Recently, in May 2021, the company Italo also inaugurated its new route that passes by Benevento and connects the city with Milan (in 5 hours and a half) and Rome (2 hours).

=== Airports ===
The nearest airports are:

- Salerno-Pontecagnano (QSR): 89 km (55 mi)
- Napoli-Capodichino (NAP): 91 km (57 mi)

== Notable people ==
- Saint Januarius, Bishop of Naples and martyr, possibly born in Benevento
- Alberto di Morra (c. 1100–1187), later Pope Gregory VIII>
- Antonio Sancho de Benevento, a silversmith artist of the Spanish Renaissance and monk of the Monastery of Sant Jeroni de Cotalba
- Saint Giuseppe Moscati (1880–1927), doctor and first modern physician designated a saint by the Catholic Church
- Menato Boffa (1930–1996), racing driver
- Carlotta Nobile (1988–2013), Art historian, violinist, blogger and Art Director of Santa Sophia Academy chamber Orchestra

== See also ==
- University of Sannio
- Lombard coinage of Benevento

== Sources ==
- von Falkenhausen, Vera (1983). "I Longobardi meridionali". In Giuseppe Galasso (ed.). Il Mezzogiorno dai Bizantini a Federico II. Turin: UTET. pp. 251–364.
- Cilento, Nicola (1971). Italia meridionale longobarda. Milan-Naples: Ricciardi.
