= Aequum Tuticum =

Roman vicus in Italy

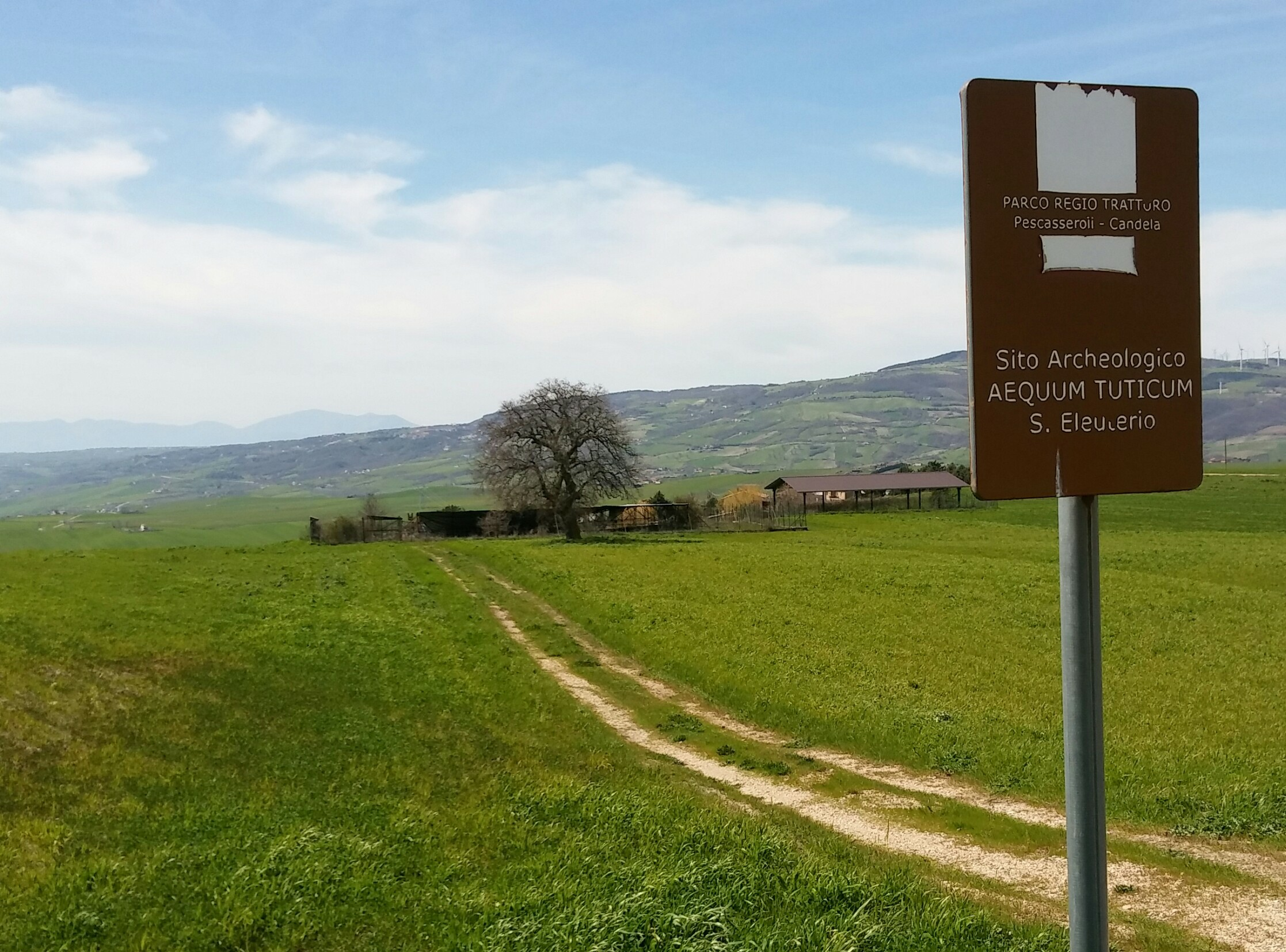

- Location within Italy
- 41°14′32.3″N 15°5′54.5″E
- Type: Settlement
- Periods: Roman Republic – Roman Empire
- Cultures: Samnites – Ancient Rome
- Location: Saint Eleuterio, Ariano Irpino
- Region: Campania

Site notes
- Elevation: 575 m (1,886 ft)
- Management: Superintendence for Archaeological Heritage of Salerno, Avellino, Benevento and Caserta

UNESCO World Heritage Site
- Part of: Via Appia. Regina Viarum
- Criteria: Cultural: iii, iv, vi
- Reference: 1708-016
- Inscription: 2024 (46th Session)

Aequum Tuticum was a Roman vicus in southern Italy, about 35 km east-northeast of Beneventum. The site lies beside Saint Eleuterio hamlet, overlooking Miscano Valley at an elevation of 575 m, about 15 km north of the modern Ariano Irpino, within Irpinia historical district. The vicus name is partly Latin (Aequum, meaning "plain", "flatland") and partly Oscan (Tuticum, "popular", "public").

Aequum Tuticum was founded near the intersection of two ancient Roman roads: Via Minucia (expressly cited by Ovidius) and Via Aemilia in Hirpinis, whose existence is attested by two 2nd century BC milestones (found in the nearby areas "Torre Amando" and "Camporeale Saint Lucia") showing the inscription "Marcus Aemilius Lepidus". The vicus was first mentioned by Marcus Tullius Cicero in a 50 b.C. letter addressed to his friend Titus Pomponius Atticus; he described the place (under the name of Equus Tuticus) as a regular stopping point along the route to Apulia.

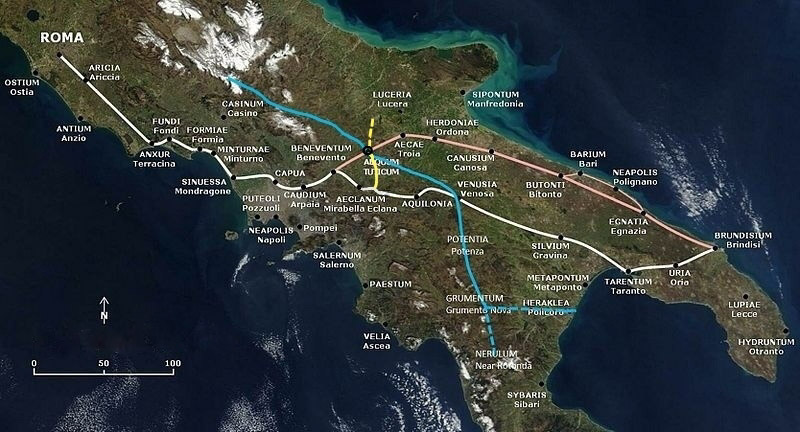
Aequum Tuticum at the crossroads between Via Aemilia in Hirpinis (yellow), Via Traiana (red) and Via Herculia (blue), three branches of ancient Via Appia (white)

At the time of Hadrian, when the vicus was a possession of the gens Seppia from Beneventum, it became a relevant road junction because the vicus lay at the crossroads between Via Traiana and Via Herculia.

Near Aequum Tuticum, just to the north, a stretch of Via Traiana has been discovered along Miscano torrent, whereas two sepulchral areas show up to the south and west; aerial photographs have also shown the route of Via Herculia.

Archaeological excavations, carried out between 1990 and 2000, found wall structures and evidence from the Roman era such as ceramics, inscriptions, funerary steles and coins. The oldest complex appears to be a thermal structure dating back to 1st century. The central compartment, named frigidarium, shows up a mosaic in black and white tiles. There are also a series of 2nd century rooms arranged in rows in (maybe rooms used as a warehouse or shop).

The settlement suffered damage from an earthquake in the second half of 4th century, but shortly afterwards a villa, showing a compartment decorated with a vast polychromatic mosaic, was installed above the older buildings.

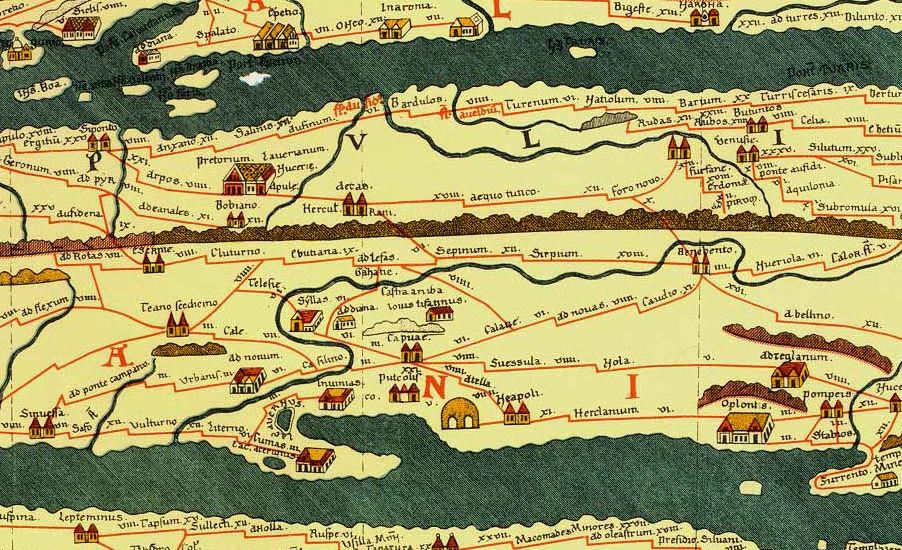
Aequum Tuticum at the center of Tabula Peutingeriana

Aequum Tuticum, mentioned in Tabula Peutingeriana and Itinerarium Antoninum, was then abandoned by 6th century, presumably due to Barbarian invasions. The high-medieval sources mention the locality (probably already uninhabited) as Saint Eleuterio, which is a name of Greek-Byzantine origin (at the end of 9th century Byzantine troops, coming from Apulia, had occupied Benevento, which they held for several years).

However, there are traces of a resettling in the Middle Ages (12th century), when the ancient Roman walls were incorporated into those of a building forming part of the new inhabited hamlet also called "Saint Eleuterio" (not to be confused with the nearby modern Contrada Saint Eleuterio), then in turn abandoned.

A collection of finds from Aequum Tuticum is kept in Ariano Irpino Archaeological Museum while several dozen inscriptions and architectural elements are collected in a lapidary inside the Villa comunale.
