= Benevento–Campobasso railway =

Italian regional railway

Benevento-Campobasso railway
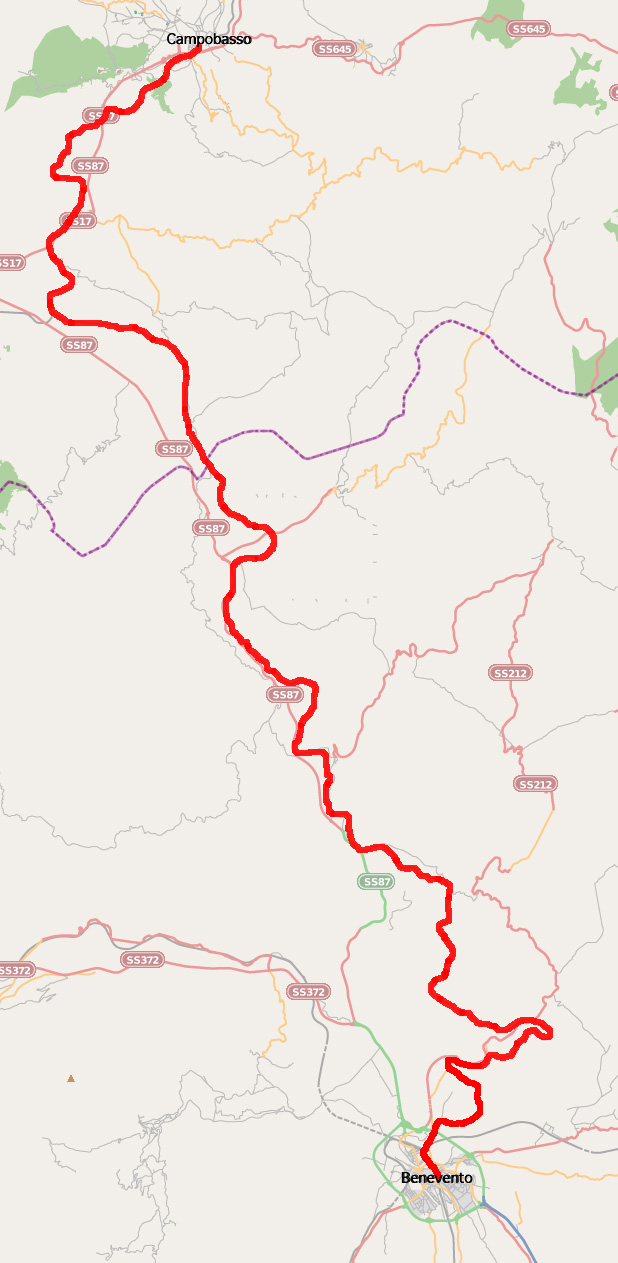
- The Benevento-Campobasso railway map

Overview
- Termini: Benevento; Campobasso

History
- Opened: 1881
- Closed: 2013 (re-opened in 2017 as a heritage railway)

Technical
- Line length: 84 km (52 mi)
- Number of tracks: 1
- Track gauge: 1,435 mm (4 ft 8 1/2 in) standard gauge
- Electrification: no
- Operating speed: 70 km/h (43 mph)

The Benevento–Campobasso railway (also known as the Samnium railway) is a secondary Italian railway line in Campania and Molise connecting Benevento with Campobasso of Samnium. Planned as an alternative to the Naples–Foggia railway to connect the Tyrrhenian Sea to the Adriatic Sea, but later deemed very slow and therefore uncompetitive, it has never been affected by large volumes of traffic.

The main interchange centres with other lines are the two terminuses; at the Bosco Redole railway station there is also the junction to Isernia, but this station has been closed.

== History ==
The line was provided for by the Baccarini Law and realised between 1879 and 1883, with regular service starting on 21 September 1883. Initially, the line had 11 stations and 4 stops. As early as 1892, a report by the municipality of Campobasso criticised the timetables on the line, the few connections with other lines and the tortuous route. Initially, in fact, there were only three daily steam runs and no direct connections with Naples. In 1894, the Bosco Redole junction was opened, where the line to Isernia arrived.

With the advent of the first diesel railcars, frequency and journey times improved on the line, which did not suffer any major damage during World War II, as it was far from strategically important locations, and thus resumed operation immediately after the war.

In the 1960s and 1970s, 10 daily runs were achieved, in addition to the establishment of a direct Naples-Campobasso train, called the "Arrow of Molise" (in Italian: Freccia del Molise) and routed at Benevento on the Cancello-Benevento railway, and one or two direct Benevento-Termoli runs, but the Naples-Termoli connection via Benevento and Campobasso never really worked due to the high journey times and the type of route to be covered, still relegating the line to local importance.

In the 1980s the line dwindled to eight daily runs, of which only a few served the stops at Sassinoro, Santa Maria Colle di Serra, Cese and Benevento Acquafredda. In the 1990s, the line, which also suffered from competition from buses on the Benevento-Campobasso state road, was reduced to the essential, with the elimination of the sidings at the stations of San Giuliano del Sannio, Campolattaro and Pescosannita – Fragneto L'Abate, the elimination of the Benevento Acquafredda stop and the elimination of the service on public holidays. All stations except the terminuses and the Bosco Redole station, which acted as a junction, were made unstaffed, and the weekday service was reduced first to 5, then 3 and finally 2 pairs of daily trains, in addition to the direct route to Naples, which was however routed via Caserta, increasing the journey time and thus depriving it of the name "Freccia del Molise", which was taken over by another train via Isernia-Vairano.

From 2000 to 2005 there were also special trains from Naples to Pietrelcina, supplemented by a shuttle bus from the station to the town, for religious events linked to the shrine of Saint Pio of Pietrelcina. Between 2006 and 2013, however, there were only connections between Benevento and Campobasso: first three pairs a day, then two and, finally, one. In 2008, the Santa Maria Colle di Serra and Campolattaro stops were also discontinued.

=== Suppression of service ===
From 13 February 2013 the line was interrupted between the stations of Bosco Redole and Benevento due to infrastructure problems (landslides in the area of Santa Croce del Sannio). Only one pair of trains remained in circulation at the time of the suspension of regular service.

=== Reactivation as a heritage railway ===
The line was partially reactivated on 23 September 2017 for tourism, as a heritage railway (the "Sannio Express" tourist train organised by the Campania region and the FS Foundation runs on it) on the occasion of the opening of the Pietrelcina station. Subsequently, other direct runs from Naples and Salerno to Pietrelcina were made with FS ALn 663 railcars in double traction.

On 23 September there was a train on the Naples-Pietrelcina line and on 10 October one on the Benevento-Morcone line, for the filming of the final scene of Paolo Sorrentino's "The Hand of God".

Since 2022 the line has been traversed by several heritage and historical trains, including those on the Napoli Centrale – Fragneto Monforte route, with a stop in Pietrelcina, in connection with the annual hot-air balloon festival held in the latter municipality.

As of 2024 there are eight substitute buses daily on the Benevento–Campobasso route, but with intermediate stops only in Fragneto Monforte (only for some journeys), Pontelandolfo, Morcone and Sepino (only for some journeys).

== The route ==
The line is a 1435 mm standard-gauge railway, with a single-track, not electrified, with a winding route that makes it uncompetitive with the journey times of road transport; many towns are at a considerable distance from their stations. The maximum gradient is 26 per thousand. Along the railway are centres of tourist attraction such as Morcone, Sepino and Pietrelcina.

== Rolling stock ==
FS 625 steam locomotives and FS ALn 556 2200 series railcars ran on the line until the 1970s, later replaced mainly by FS ALn 668.1800 series railcars until 2013; FS ALn 663 1100 series railcars were also used during that period, and diesel Minuettos began running from 2006. On the other hand, FS D.343 and FS D.345 diesel locomotives were the predominant locomotives of the rare freight trains on the line.
