= Aversa railway station =

Railway station in Italy

Aversa
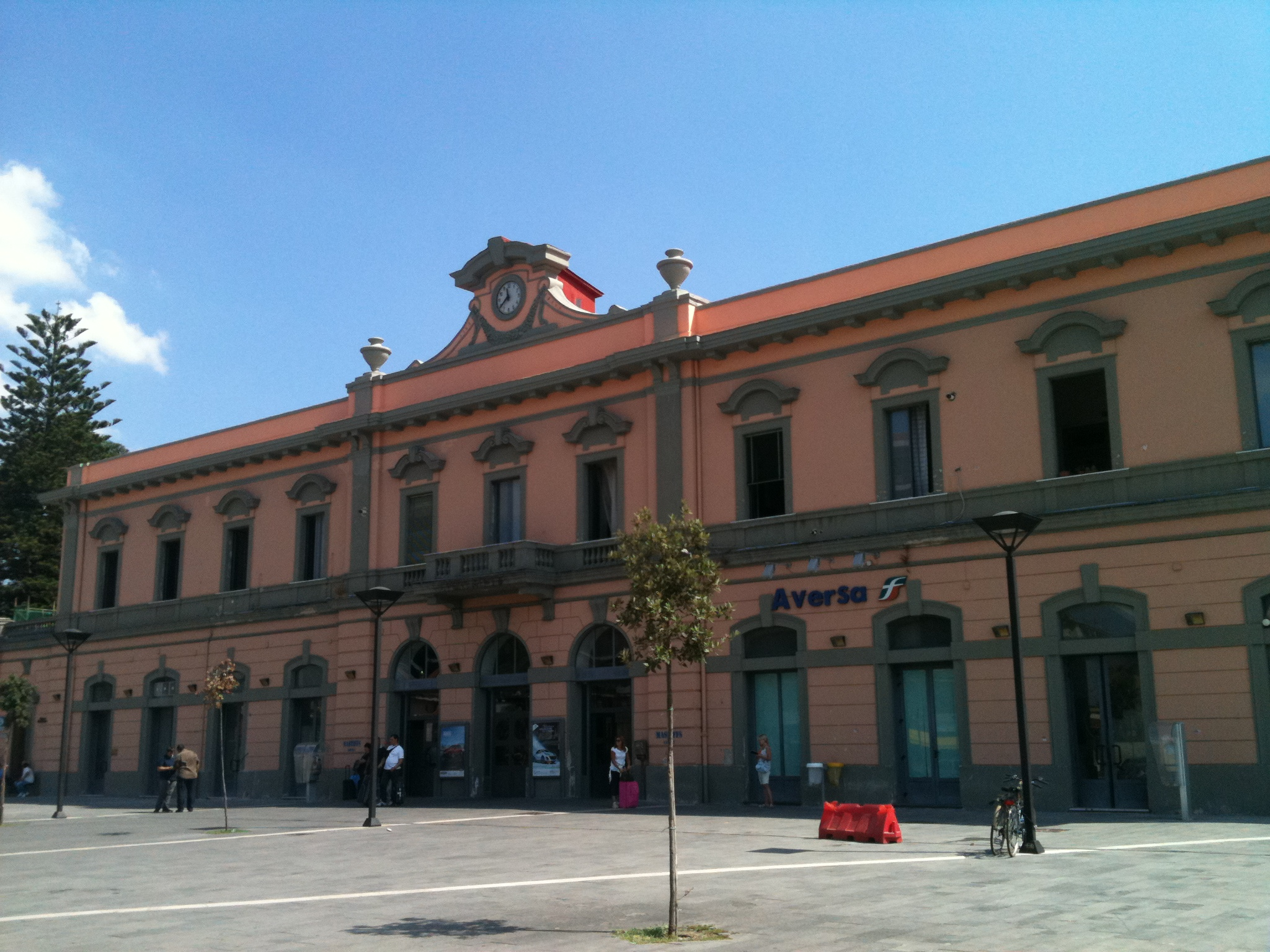
- The passenger building from outside.

General information
- Location: Piazza Giuseppe Mazzini; 81031 Aversa CE; Aversa, Caserta, Campania; Italy
- Coordinates: 40°58′28″N 14°13′04″E
- Operator: Rete Ferroviaria Italiana
- Lines: Rome–Formia–Naples; Naples–Foggia
- Distance: 178.320 km (110.803 mi) from Foggia
- Train operators: Trenitalia
- Connections: Naples Metro; Local buses

Other information
- Classification: Gold

History
- Opened: 7 May 1867; 159 years ago
Location
- Location within Campania Location within Italy

Aversa railway station (Italian: Stazione di Aversa) serves the town and comune of Aversa, in the region of Campania, southern Italy. Opened in 1867, it forms the junction between the Rome–Formia–Naples railway and the Naples–Foggia railway.

The station is currently managed by Rete Ferroviaria Italiana (RFI). Most train services are operated by Trenitalia. Each of these companies is a subsidiary of Ferrovie dello Stato (FS), Italy's state-owned rail company.

== Location ==
Aversa railway station is situated at Piazza Giuseppe Mazzini, at the eastern edge of the town centre.

== History ==
The station was opened on 7 May 1867, upon the inauguration of the Naples–Caserta section of the Naples–Foggia railway.

== Train services ==
The station is served by the following services (incomplete):

- Intercity services Rome - Naples - Salerno - Lamezia Terme - Messina - Palermo
- Intercity services Rome - Naples - Salerno - Lamezia Terme - Messina - Siracusa
- Intercity services Rome - Naples - Salerno - Lamezia Terme - Reggio di Calabria
- Intercity services Rome - Naples - Salerno - Taranto
- Intercity services Turin - Genoa - La Spezia - Pisa - Livorno - Rome - Naples - Salerno
- Night train (Intercity Notte) Rome - Naples - Messina - Siracusa
- Night train (Intercity Notte) Turin - Genoa - La Spezia - Pisa - Livorno - Rome - Naples - Salerno
- Regional services (Treno Regionale) Rome - Pomezia - Latina - Formia - Minturno - Naples

== Features ==
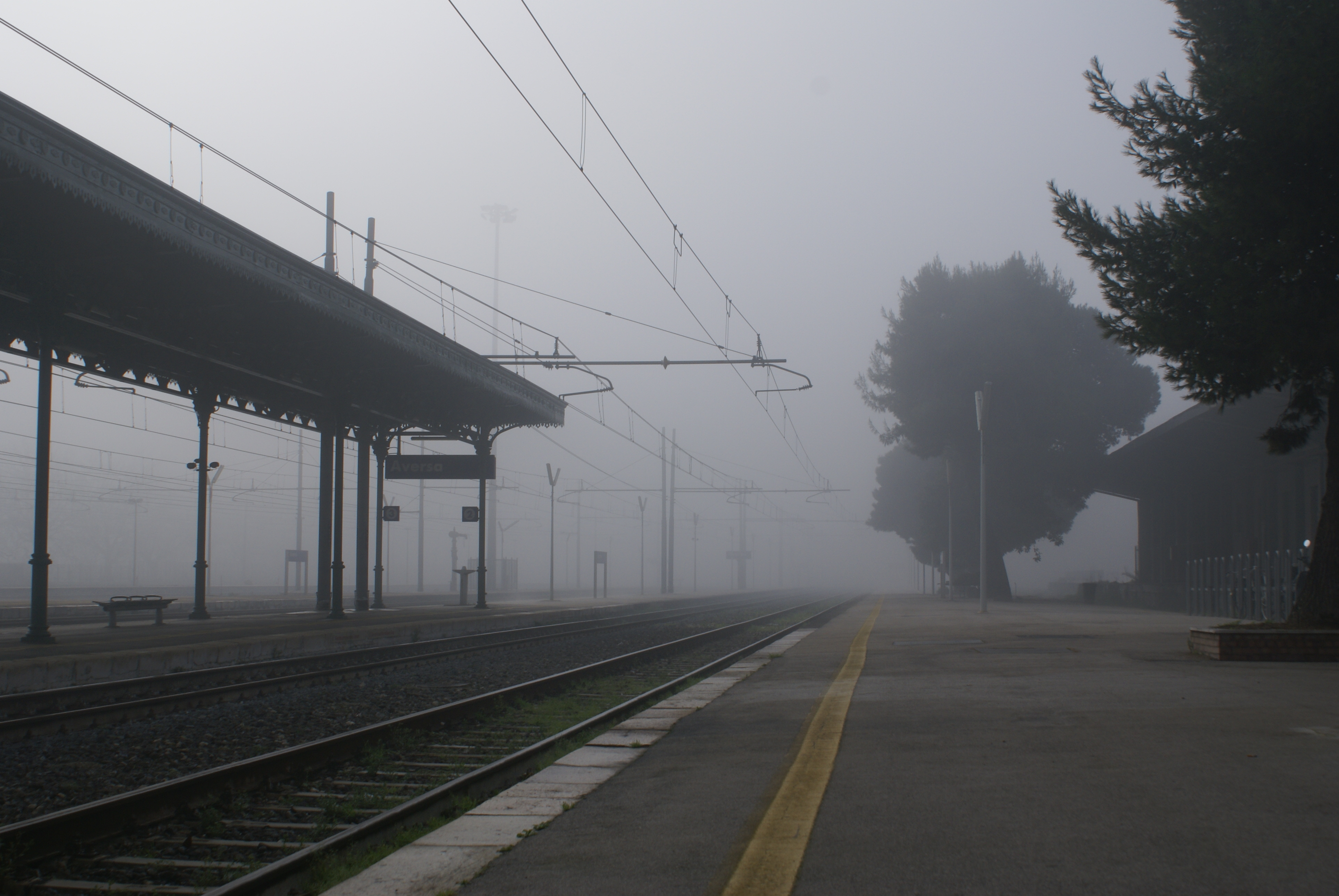
View of the station yard, June 2007.

The passenger building is a rectangular, two-level structure. It hosts several services, including ticketing, a bar, and the office of the railway police.

In the station yard, there are seven tracks used for passenger services. The tracks are equipped with platforms, which are connected with each other by a pedestrian underpass.

== Management ==
To systematize the objective parameters of all Italian railway stations, and better manage the various types of interventions (upgrading, automation, and restyling), RFI has created a classification system allocating every one of its stations to one of four categories - platinum, gold, silver, bronze. The categories take into account such factors as the number of visitors, the services offered to the railway companies, the importance of the urban context.

Aversa railway station is classified gold under this system. By 2016, it will have been upgraded, as part of the PEGASUS project (Italian: Programma Evoluto per la Gestione di Aree di Stazioni Ubicate nel Sud Italia) (English: Advanced Program for Management of Areas of Stations located in South Italy), which was launched in 2004 and aimed at the improvement and enhancement of 101 stations located in southern regions.

== Passenger and train movements ==
The station is one of the busiest in Campania. Its passenger flow is high and remains constant throughout the year.

Many types of trains stop at the station, including regional, express, InterCity and InterCity Night trains. The station handles 156 trains per day as per the official timetable in force since December 13, 2009.

There are numerous daily connections to Naples and Caserta, and Rome.

== Eurostar Italia High Speed ==
With the inauguration of the Rome–Naples high-speed railway on 19 December 2005, and more specifically the section between Roma Salon and Gricignano di Aversa it was necessary to divert the Eurostar Italia high-speed trains onto the traditional line to reach the capital of Campania inbound and outbound.

In more recent times, since the completion of the remaining 18 km separating Gricignano di Aversa from Napoli Centrale on December 13, 2009, it has no longer been necessary for the Eurostar Italia high speed trains to pass through the station.

== Interchange ==
There is a bus terminus at the station.

== See also ==
- History of rail transport in Italy
- List of railway stations in Campania
- Rail transport in Italy
- Railway stations in Italy
