= Benevento railway station =

Railway station in Benevento, Campania, Italy

Benevento
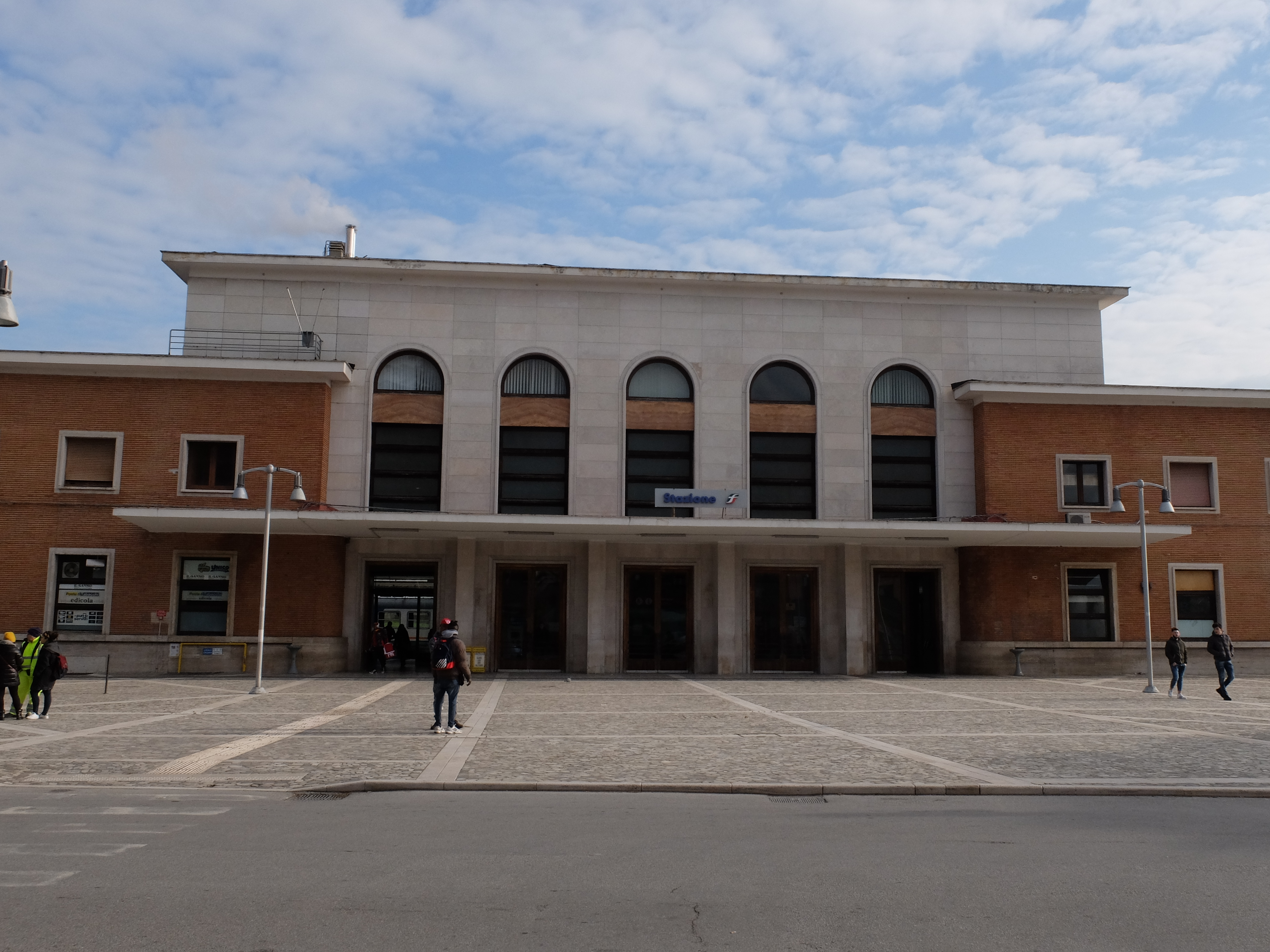
- View of the passenger building.

General information
- Location: Piazza Vittoria Colonna; 82100 Benevento BN; Benevento, Benevento, Campania; Italy
- Coordinates: 41°08′31″N 14°46′11″E
- Operator: Rete Ferroviaria Italiana; Centostazioni
- Lines: Naples–Foggia; Benevento–Campobasso; Cancello–Benevento; Benevento–Cancello (EAV)
- Distance: 100.859 km (62.671 mi) from Foggia
- Train operators: Trenitalia; Italo Nuovo Trasporto Viaggiatori
- Connections: City buses

Other information
- Classification: Gold

History
- Opened: 18 April 1868; 158 years ago
Location
- Location within Campania Location within Italy

Benevento railway station (Italian: Stazione di Benevento) is the main station serving the city and comune of Benevento, in the region of Campania, southern Italy. Opened in 1868, it forms part of the Naples–Foggia railway, and is also a terminus of three secondary railways, linking Benevento with Campobasso, Avellino, and Cancello, respectively.

The station is currently managed by Rete Ferroviaria Italiana (RFI). However, the commercial area of the passenger building is managed by Centostazioni. Train services on all lines other than the Cancello line are operated by Trenitalia. Each of these companies is a subsidiary of Ferrovie dello Stato (FS), Italy's state-owned rail company.

Train services on the Cancello line are operated by Ente Autonomo Volturno, which is owned by the Consorzio UnicoCampania group.

== Location ==
Benevento railway station is situated at Piazza Vittoria Colonna, northwest of the city centre.

== History ==
The station was opened on 18 April 1868, upon the inauguration of the Casalduni–Benevento section of the Naples–Foggia railway.

On 1 August 1868, the station became a through station, when the next section of the Naples–Foggia railway was completed, between Benevento and Montecalvo Irpino. Over the years, several other lines converged on the station.

During its life, the station has undergone several changes, such as the construction of a new passenger building, and the restructuring of its underpasses. At the start of 2007, it was completely automated.

== Features ==
The current passenger building is a two-storey structure that was built during the late 1960s. It is formed of a central section featuring five large arched windows, and two lateral wings. At ground floor level, there are services for passengers, while the first floor houses Trenitalia offices. There is also an office of the railway police.

In the station yard, there are five through tracks used for passenger services. The station yard also has three platforms equipped with shelters and joined via a pedestrian underpass. Additionally, there are some dock platforms for terminating trains to and from Naples.

The station also has a goods yard with several tracks, and a locomotive shed for diesel locomotives.

== Train services ==
The station has about 800,000 passenger movements each year. In recent years, the number of passenger movements has fallen appreciably, due to poor patronage on some of the converging lines.

All passenger trains passing through the station stop there, including Eurostar Italia and InterCity trains.

The station is also the terminus of regional trains Sannio Express to and from Campobasso, regional from and to Caserta, closed regional rail from and to Salerno (served by buses), regional rail to and from Napoli Centrale, closed regional rail to and from Avellino (served by buses) and closed regional rail from and to Foggia.

The station is served by the following services (incomplete):

- High speed trains (Frecciarossa) Naples - Caserta - Benevento - Foggia - Bari
- High speed services (Frecciargento) Rome - Foggia - Bari - Brindisi - Lecce
- High speed trains (Italo) Milan - Reggio Emilia - Bologna - Firenze - Rome - Benevento - Foggia - Bari
- Intercity services Rome - Caserta - Benevento - Foggia - Bari
- Intercity services Rome - Caserta - Benevento - Foggia - Bari - Taranto
- Night train (Intercity Night) Rome - Benevento - Foggia - Bari - Brindisi - Lecce
- Regional trains (Treno regionale) Naples - Aversa - Caserta - Benevento
- Regional trains (Treno regionale) Campobasso - Benevento - Avellino - Salerno (served by buses)

== Interchange ==
The station has a city bus terminal for buses operated by AMTS, the local bus service.

== See also ==
- History of rail transport in Italy
- List of railway stations in Campania
- Rail transport in Italy
- Railway stations in Italy
