= Trolleybuses in Avellino =

Public transit network in Avellino, Italy

Avellino trolleybus system
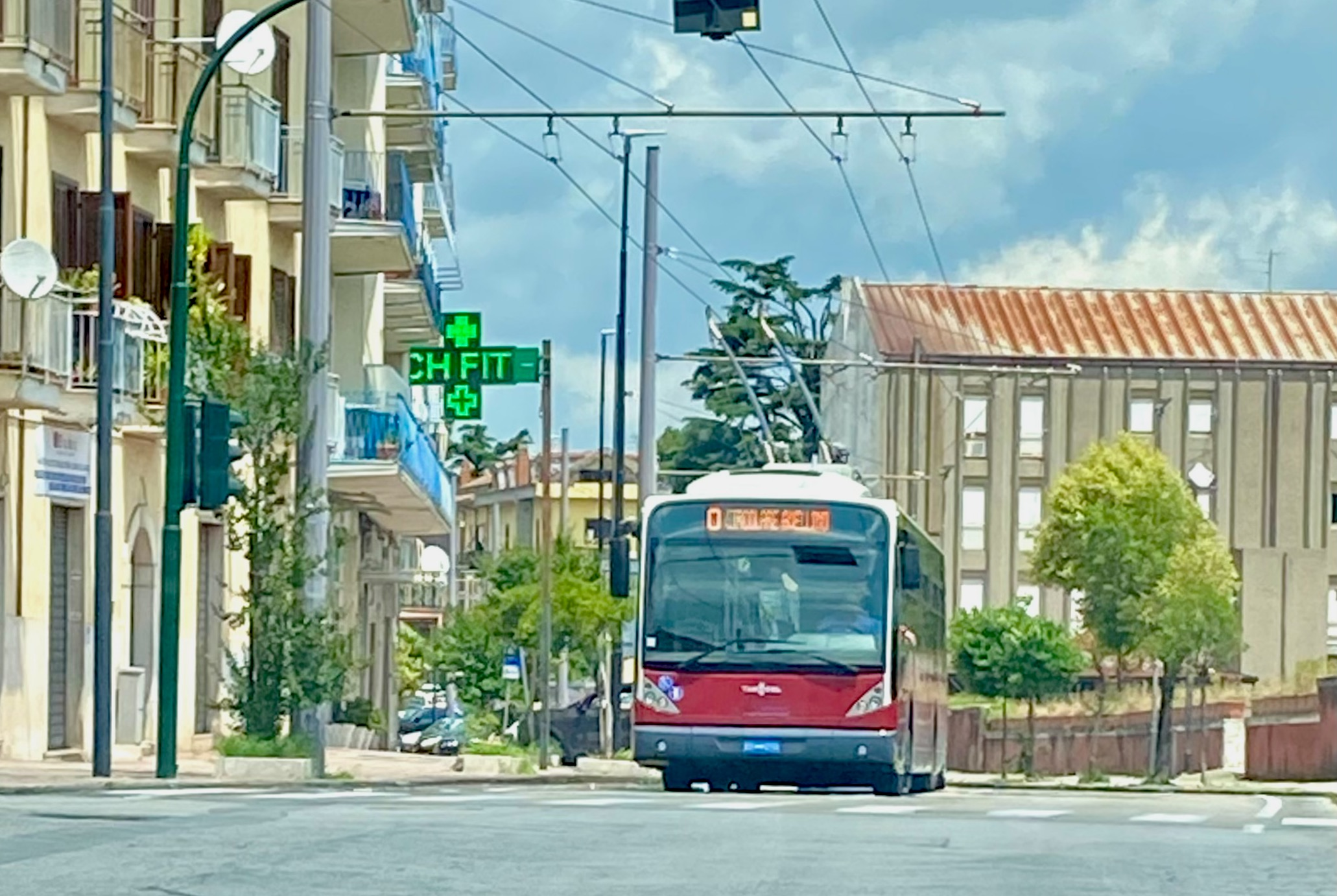
- A trolleybus southbound in Via Tedesco near the railway station in July 2023

Operation
- Locale: Avellino, Italy

Statistics
First era: 1947–1973
- Status: Closed
- Routes: 2
- Operator: 1947–1973: Società Filoviaria Irpina
- Electrification: 600 Volts DC
- Route length: 13.44 km (8.35 mi) (1960)
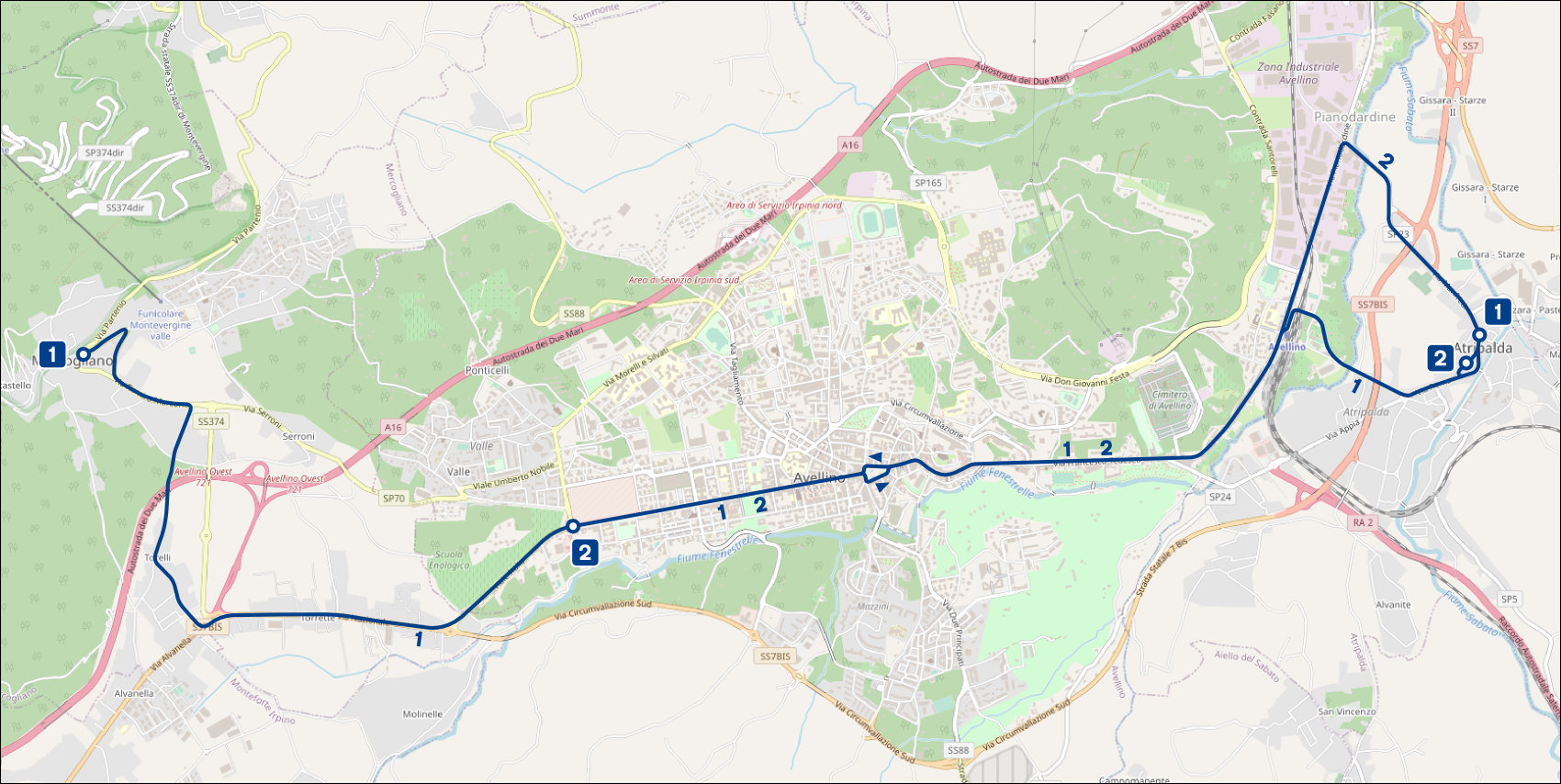
Current era: Since 2023
- Status: Service suspended indefinitely (since 6 July 2023); reopening planned, by 2026
- Routes: 1
- Owner: Comune di Avellino
- Operator: AIR Campania
- Electrification: 750 V DC
- Route length: Approx. 5.5 km (3.4 mi)
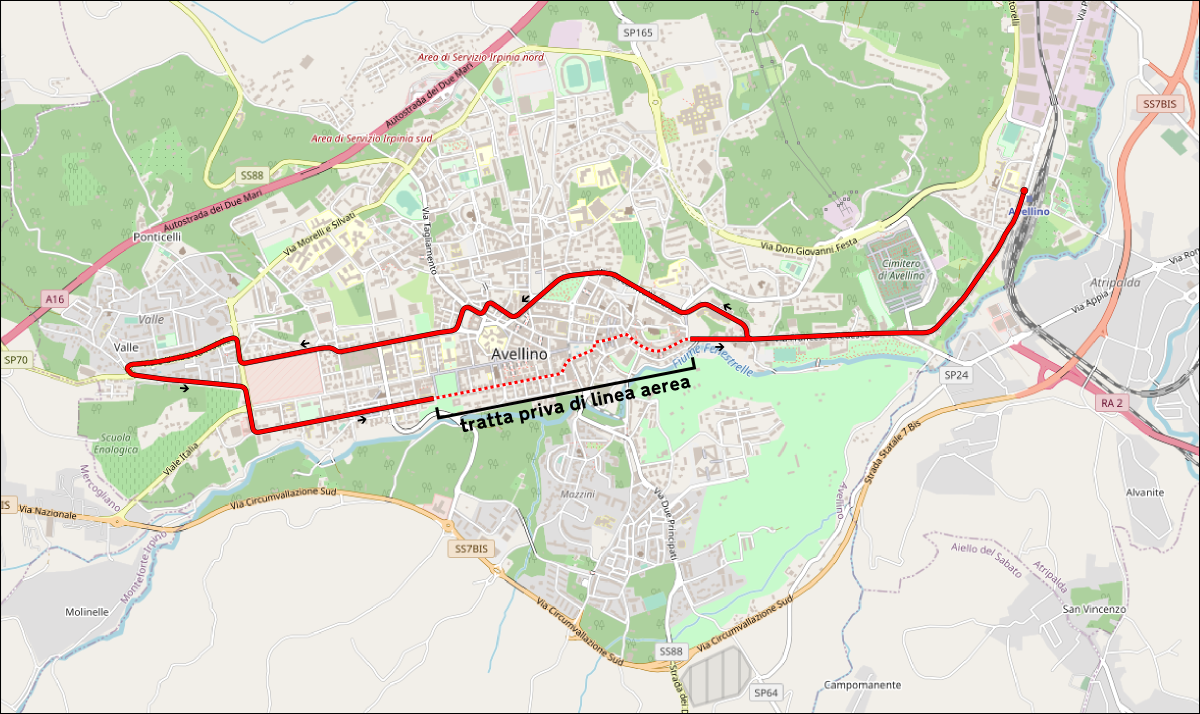

The Avellino trolleybus system (Italian: Rete filoviaria di Avellino) forms part of the public transport network of the city of Avellino and the province of Avellino, in the region of Campania. Trolleybuses originally served the city from 1947 to 1973, on a route that also extended outside the city to the neighbouring towns of Atripalda and (from 1956) Mercogliano, and then the system closed. However, in the 2000s work to build a new trolleybus system got under way and new vehicles were purchased for it in 2007, and were delivered in 2014. The project experienced several delays after the start of construction in 2009, but most issues had been resolved by 2020 and construction was largely completed by 2021. Throughout its planning and construction, it was inaccurately referred to as the "metropolitana leggera" (light metro, or light rail), when in fact it was never planned to be a rail line, and always planned to be a trolleybus line. The last round of testing took place in December 2022 and January 2023. The new trolleybus system opened for service on 3 April 2023, but service was suspended only three months later and is not expected to resume until 2026.

== First system ==
=== History ===
The first trolleybus line in Avellino opened for service on 16 September 1947, a 9-kilometre-long (5.6 mi) (round trip) route connecting the city centre with the railway station and the directly adjacent town of Atripalda. It was constructed by the Compagnia Generale di Elettricità (General Electric Power Company) but managed by the Società Filoviaria Irpina. In 1956, the route was extended from the city centre to the neighbouring town of Mercogliano, making it an interurban route and increasing the entire system's length of overhead wiring to 13.44 kilometres (8.35 miles) (including two alternative routings between Avellino and Atripalda). There were then two routes, with route 1 running through to Mercogliano and route 2 ending at Viale Italia west of the city centre in Avellino. The two routes followed different routings on their easternmost sections, between the railway station and Atripalda. The end-to-end length of route 1, Atripalda–Avellino–Mercogliano, was around 10.7 km (6.6 mi) in length, and the section of route 2 that was not also included in route 1 was around 2.5 km (1.6 mi) long.

By 1959, the company was already operating at a loss, and in 1971 it was placed in receivership. The trolleybus system closed on 1 November 1973, initially caused by a major breakdown of the substation but made permanent when, in June 1974, the Commissione Amministratrice del Consorzio Trasporti Irpini (Administrative Commission of the Irpini Transport Consortium, established in May 1973) gave permission for the permanent replacement of trolleybuses by motorbuses.

=== Fleet ===
The all-time fleet of the original system consisted of the following trolleybuses:

- 5 Fiat 668F with Cansa bodies (Nos. 01–05), built 1947.
- 1 Fiat 2401FM with Cansa body (No. 06), built 1953.
- 3 Fiat 668F with Cansa bodies (Nos. 07–09), built 1945; acquired secondhand from the Salerno trolleybus system and placed in service in Avellino in 1966.
- 1 Alfa Romeo 140AF three-axle vehicle with Pistoiesi body (No. 183), built 1955; acquired secondhand from Salerno and placed in service in Avellino in 1956.
- 1 Alfa Romeo 140AF three-axle vehicle with Cansa body (No. 184), built 1955.

At the end of service, only Nos. 02, 03, 05, and 08 were serviceable.

== Second system ==
=== History ===
In the late 1990s, local officials began considering bringing trolleybus operation back to Avellino. In December 2003, the national government's Committee for Economic Planning gave its approval to a plan to build an "11 km" (5.5 km each direction) trolleybus line between the railway station and Valle.

In 2007, an order was placed with Van Hool for eleven A330T trolleybuses for the planned new system. On 4 February 2008, the contract for construction of the line was signed. Locally, the planned line was inaccurately named the "metropolitana leggera" (light metro, or light rail), when in fact it was never planned to be a rail line. That inaccurate name, or the shorter version "metro leggera", continued to be in use throughout the project's subsequent construction.

Construction work began in April 2009, at which time the system was projected to open in 2010. The eleven trolleybuses were completed by fall 2010, but were being stored at the Van Hool factory, not shipped, because construction of the infrastructure in Avellino was still not complete. The first trolleybus was received in Avellino in April 2014 and all others had arrived by the end of the year.

However, construction work on the new system encountered delays and was suspended for some lengthy periods, including from 2011 to spring 2013 and progress was also only limited during 2015. The first test trip by a trolleybus powered from the overhead trolley wires took place in June 2016, but by August 2017 still only about half of the 5.5-kilometre-long (3.4 mi) route had been equipped with overhead wires. Construction was mostly completed by October 2018, but Trolleybus Magazine reported that "the opening of the system continues to be deferred because of disagreements between the Campania Region, the local bus company AIR Avellino, and the city council concerning the financing of the final completion of the system, including staff training, and the funding of the operation of the system once it has opened." By 2020, most of those issues had been resolved.

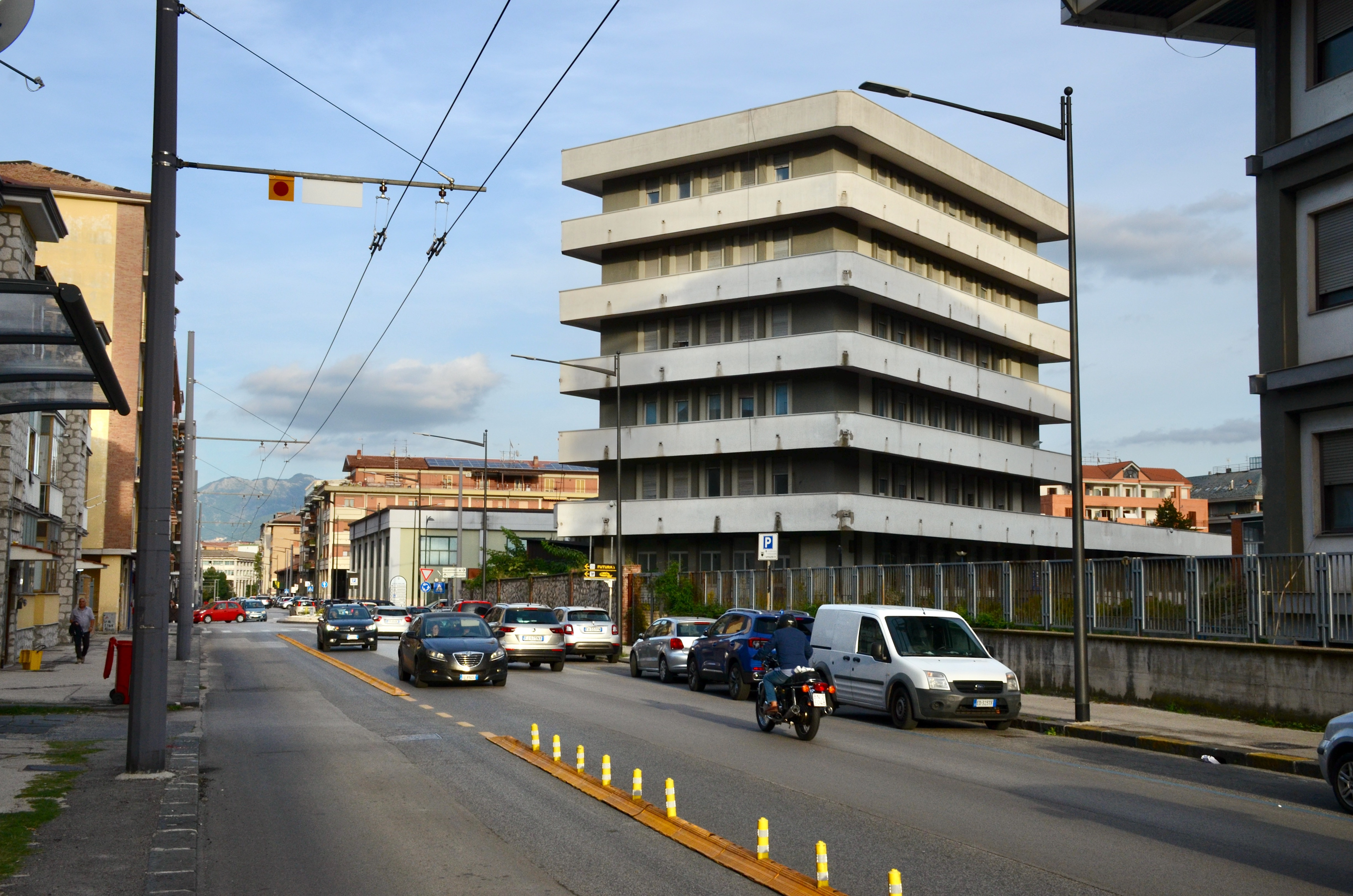
Via Cristoforo Colombo in September 2022, with trolleybus overhead wires and a then-new bus lane

By 2021, construction had finally been completed, but testing did not resume and the system still did not open. In November, national transport officials advised the city and regional governments that they would be required to return €20 million of European Union funding if the trolleybus system did not open by July 2022. In February, the city hired ANM, the operator of the Naples trolleybus system, to consult on the remaining preparations needed to open the system.

Longstanding plans to create new bus-only lanes along the route (through removal of parking) only began to be implemented in June 2022, and vehicle testing finally resumed in July 2022. Subsequently, predicted opening dates for the start of passenger service continued to go unmet. At the end of November, an agreement was signed transferring the fleet of trolleybuses, which are owned by the City of Avellino, to operator AIR Campania on a free-loan basis, and the final pre-opening operation – simulated service (without passengers) – for six days was scheduled to begin on 5 December 2022, with opening of the new system to the public predicted for 12 December. However, while the pre-opening operation did begin on 5 December, using four trolleybuses, the system did not open on 12 December as had been planned. The newspaper Il Mattino reported on 12 December that no new opening date had been set, and that the introduction of passenger service now might not occur before Christmas. It was then announced that testing had been suspended and would resume in January 2023. The national regulatory authority ANSFISA (the National Agency for the Safety of Railways and Road and Highway Infrastructure) had yet to give its final approval to open the system. That approval was granted in March, and the opening date was announced for 3 April.

==== Opening and suspension ====
The new trolleybus system opened on 3 April 2023, with service running half-hourly, Mondays to Saturdays from 7:30 am until only 4:55 pm, (or approximately 7:00 am to 5:40 pm according to the full timetable). The route had a round-trip length of 11 km (6.8 mi) and an end-to-end length of 5.5 km (3.4 mi), with 15 stops.

However, service was suspended after just three months of operation and is not expected to resume before 2026. The suspension began on 7 July 2023, with disruptions from road works in the city centre being given as the reason. City officials originally said that the suspension was expected to last only until mid-September 2023, but in November it was announced that the line would not reopen in its current form but would be extended over the full corridor that had been served by the city's first trolleybus system, Atripalda–Avellino–Mercogliano. Initially, it was unclear whether trolleybuses would still be used, but in September 2024 the mayor indicated that the planned extended route would use trolleybuses. However, both planned route extensions – west to Mercogliano and east to Atripalda – would not be equipped with overhead wires. Although the current fleet of 2010-built Van Hool trolleybuses have diesel engines for limited "off-wire" operation, the engines are not sufficiently powerful for such expanded use, and consequently the extension plans will require either the retrofitting of the existing fleet with newer equipment for greater off-wire operation or their replacement with new vehicles. A choice between those two options remains to be made. A consultant was hired to undertake additional studies of the extension project, and in the meantime trolleybus service is expected to remain suspended until at least 2026.

=== Route ===
The service that operated briefly in 2023 was along a route that connected the railway station with Via Fraternita della Misericordia, in the western part of the town. The route is 5.5 km (3.4 mi) long, of which about 3 km is along separate streets in opposite directions. Around 1.3 kilometres (0.81 mi) of the eastbound route is not equipped with overhead wiring, and the trolleybuses covered that section using their diesel engines.

=== Fleet ===
The fleet of the current system comprises eleven two-axle, 12-metre (40 ft) vehicles, with auxiliary diesel engines enabling them to operate away from the overhead wires to a limited extent:

- 11 Van Hool A330T (with Vossloh Kiepe electrical equipment), low-floor vehicles built in 2010 and delivered in 2014, but then placed in storage locally for several years until the route's infrastructure was completed. They returned to storage in July 2023, when the new system ceased operation indefinitely.

== See also ==
- List of trolleybus systems in Italy
