= Avellino railway station =

Railway station in Italy

Avellino
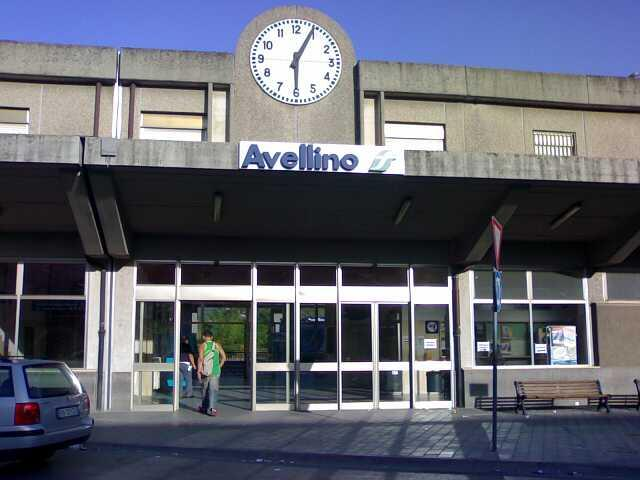
- View of the station building

General information
- Location: Via Francesco Tedesco, 646; 83100 Avellino AV; Avellino, Avellino, Campania; Italy
- Coordinates: 40°55′17.04″N 14°49′13.62″E
- Operator: Rete Ferroviaria Italiana
- Lines: Cancello–Benevento (served by buses); Avellino-Lioni-Rocchetta
- Distance: 82 km (51 mi) from Napoli Centrale
- Platforms: 3 (5 tracks)
- Train operators: Trenitalia
- Connections: Urban and suburban buses

Other information
- Classification: Silver

History
- Opened: 1879; 147 years ago
Location
- Location within Campania Location within Italy

Avellino is the main railway station of the Italian city of Avellino, in the region of Campania. It is owned by the Ferrovie dello Stato, the national rail company of Italy, and is classified Silver.

== Geography ==
Situated in the western suburb of Avellino, 2.5 km from the city centre, the station also serves the town of Atripalda, whose territory borders with it. The end track of the RA2 motorway from Salerno is located 500 m south of the station.

== History ==
The station was opened in 1879, as the northern terminal of the line from Mercato San Severino, extended to Benevento in 1891. The line to Lioni and Rocchetta Sant'Antonio followed in 1895.

== Structure and transport ==
Avellino station has a large two-floor building. It counts five tracks for passenger service and three for goods wagons, with a shed located in front of the main building. North of the station is a brief line serving the industrial park of Pianodardine. Both lines, Cancello–Benevento and Avellino-Rocchetta Sant'Antonio, are not electrified and have a single track.

The station is a hub for regional transport of Campania and is served by regional trains, principally to Benevento and Salerno. Periodically it is also served by some trains to Nocera Inferiore and Napoli Centrale (Naples). Once per day it is linked to Roma Termini (Rome) by an interregional train via Caserta and Cassino. From the end of the 1990s to the first half of the 2000s, Avellino was the terminal of a night express train to Milano Centrale (Milan); that linked it also with the cities of Rome, Florence and Bologna.

The line to Rocchetta Sant'Antonio-Lacedonia was closed in December 2010. An FS-owned bus link, Avellino-Lioni, is the remaining service on this line.

== See also ==
- Railway stations in Italy
- List of railway stations in Campania
- Rail transport in Italy
- History of rail transport in Italy
