= Atripalda =

- Comune
- Comune di Atripalda
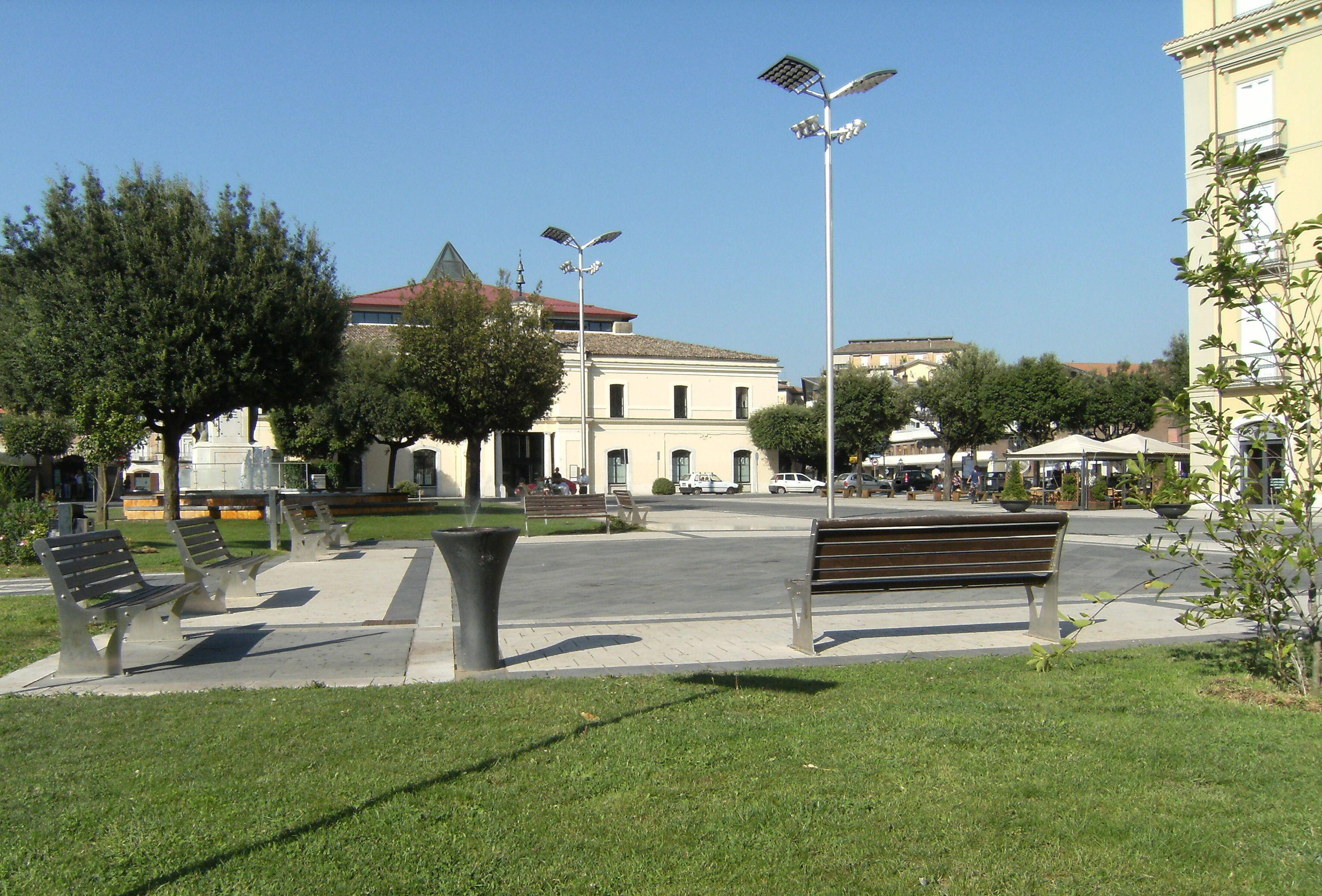
- The central "Piazza Umberto I"

- Coat of arms

- Location of Atripalda in Italy Atripalda (Campania)
- Coordinates: 40°55′0″N 14°49′32″E
- Country: Italy
- Region: Campania
- Province: Avellino (AV)

Government
  - Mayor: Paolo Spagnuolo

Area
  - Total: 8.59 km^{2} (3.32 sq mi)
- Elevation: 294 m (965 ft)

Population (31 December 2017)
  - Total: 10,968
  - Density: 1,280/km^{2} (3,310/sq mi)
- Demonym: Atripaldesi
- Time zone: UTC+1 (CET)
  - Summer (DST): UTC+2 (CEST)
- Postal code: 83042
- Dialing code: 0825
- Patron saint: St. Sabino of Avellino
- Saint day: February 9
- Website: Official website

Atripalda is a town and comune in the province of Avellino, Campania, southern Italy.

== History ==
The town is the home of the ruins of Abellinum, the Ancient Roman Avellino. A large than life-size Roman marble statue of a veiled priestess from Atripalda can be found in the British Museum's collection.

== Geography ==
Part of the urban area of Avellino, Atripalda is bordered by the municipalities of Aiello del Sabato, Avellino, Cesinali, Manocalzati, San Potito Ultra, Santo Stefano del Sole and Sorbo Serpico.

== Transport ==
The final exit "Avellino" of the RA02 motorway from Salerno is located in west of Atripalda, and the A16 exit "Avellino Est", near its eastern suburb. A dual carriageway from Mercogliano and Avellino links both the motorways and crosses Atripalda. The town is also crossed by the state highway SS7 Via Appia.

As for rail transport, Atripalda's southern suburb is widely crossed by the Avellino-Lioni-Rocchetta line without a station. This is mainly because Avellino railway station is situated close to its municipal borders.

== Notable people ==
- Vincenzo Della Pietra (born 2002) - footballer

== See also ==
- Lords of Atripalda
- Mastroberardino
- Trolleybuses in Avellino
