= Vincenzo Della Pietra =

Italian footballer (born 2002)

Personal information
- Full name: Vincenzo Paolino Della Pietra
- Date of birth: 22 June 2002 (age 24)
- Place of birth: Atripalda, Italy
- Height: 1.82 m (6 ft 0 in)
- Position: Forward

Team information
- Current team: Pompei
- Number: 32

Youth career
- –2018: Napoli
- 2019: Benevento
- 2019–2020: Juve Stabia
- 2020–2021: → Genoa (loan)

Senior career*
Years	Team	Apps	(Gls)
2020–2023	Juve Stabia	36	(2)
2020–2021	→ Genoa (loan)	0	(0)
2023	→ Monterosi (loan)	15	(1)
2023–2024	Aglianese	16	(4)
2024	Chieti	0	(0)
2024–	Pompei	11	(1)
- * Club domestic league appearances and goals as of 22 December 2023

Vincenzo Paolino Della Pietra (born 22 June 2002) is an Italian footballer who plays as a forward for Serie D club Pompei.

== Career ==
He made his Serie B debut for Juve Stabia on 13 July 2020 in a game against Frosinone.

On 5 October 2020, he joined Genoa on loan. He spent the season with their Under-19 squad, not receiving any call-ups to the senior team.

On 3 January 2023, Della Pietra was loaned by Monterosi, with an option to buy.

== Club statistics ==
As of match played 24 April 2022.

Club	Season	League			Cup		Other		Total	
Club	Season	Division	Apps	Goals	Apps	Goals	Apps	Goals	Apps	Goals
Juve Stabia	2019–20	Serie B	1	0	0	0	—		1	0
Juve Stabia	2020–21	Serie C	2	0	2	0	—		4	0
Juve Stabia	2021–22	Serie C	27	2	—		—		27	2
Juve Stabia	Total		30	2	2	0	0	0	32	2
Career total			30	2	2	0	0	0	32	2
