= Lords of Atripalda =

The Lords of Atripalda were titled signore (lord) and conte (count).

== List ==
Governor	Period	Notes
Orso Orsini (d. July 5, 1479)		Grandson of Bertoldo Orsini (d. 1417)
Giovanni Paolo Orsini	1486	
Giovan Battista Lomellino
Camillo Orsini (l. 1492–1559)		
Alfonso (Branai Kastrioti) (d. 1544)		
Antonio (Branai Kastrioti)	after 1544	
Domizio
