= Benevento–Cancello railway =

Railway line in Italy

Overview
- Status: in use
- Owner: Campania Regional Government
- Locale: Campania, Italy
- Termini: Benevento; Cancello

Service
- Type: Heavy rail
- Operator: Ente Autonomo Volturno

History
- Opened: 10 July 1913

Technical
- Line length: 47.9 km (29.8 mi)
- Number of tracks: 2
- Track gauge: 1,435 mm (4 ft 8 1/2 in) standard gauge
- Electrification: 3 kV DC

The Benevento–Cancello railway, also called Valle Caudina railway, is a railway line in Campania, Italy.

== History ==
The idea of building a railway line to connect Benevento with Naples through the Valle Caudina (Caudina Valley) was already being discussed a few decades after the construction of the coastal railway between Naples and Castellammare di Stabia, when a British company proposed its construction. However, the project failed to materialize because Benevento was then part of the Papal States, which constituted a major political obstacle.

Later, Benevento was connected to Naples via Caserta by a route built by the Società Italiana per le Strade Ferrate Meridionali; this alignment, however, was more than 30 km longer, and alternative proposals continued to be put forward. In 1905, the French company Régie Générale de Chemins de Fer et Travaux Publics (RGCF) signed a concession agreement with the Italian government, and the project was approved on 20 November 1906. Nevertheless, construction did not begin, and in 1907 the project was taken over by the Società Anonima Strade Ferrate Sovvenzionate (SFS), with the participation of the Milan-based company L'Ausiliare .

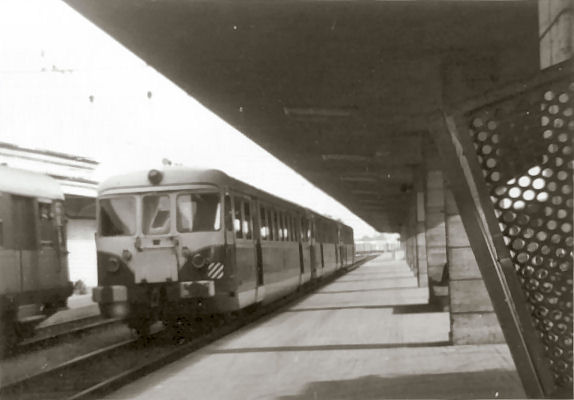
TIBB/Stanga electric multiple units and trailer coaches of the Valle Caudina railway departing from Naples Centrale on 30 April 1971.

These companies controlled a group of railway concessionaires that also operated the Massa Marittima–Follonica, Poggibonsi–Colle Val d'Elsa, and L'Aquila–Capitignano railways.

In 1910, the westernmost section between the newly built Cancello station and San Martino Valle Caudina was opened to traffic. In the same year, an agreement was signed with the Italian State Railways (FS) for through ticketing, requiring passengers bound for Naples to transfer at Cancello. In July 1911, the line was extended to San Vito–Cretazzo, which served as a temporary terminus, from where passengers could continue to Benevento by stagecoach.

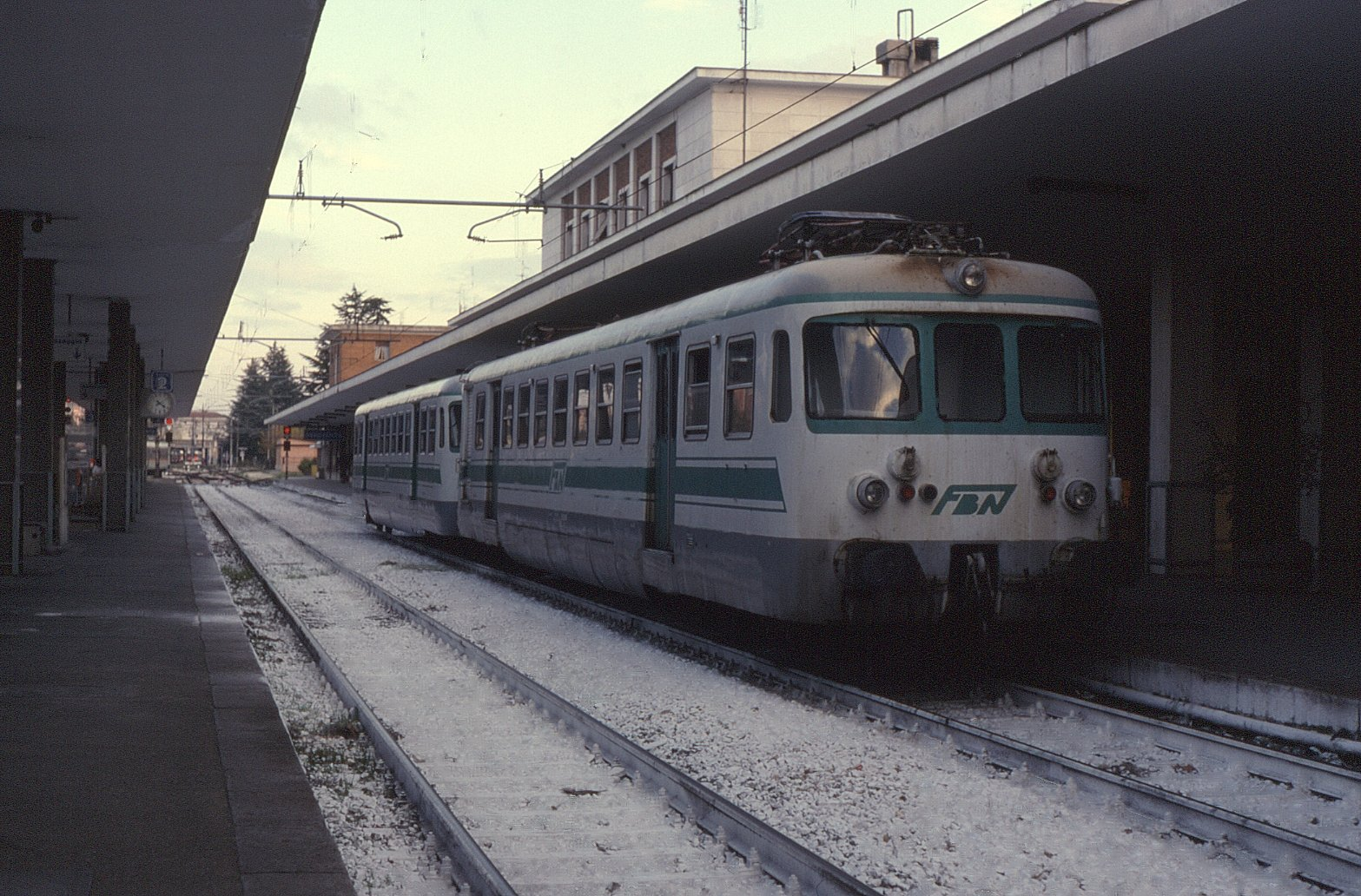
E.502 electric multiple unit with trailer coach of the Benevento–Naples railway (FBN) standing at Benevento.

The final section to the FS station of Benevento was inaugurated on 10 July 1913. The longer construction time for this section was due to the need to build two major bridges over the Calore and Sabato rivers, as well as a tunnel. Operations were initially carried out with steam locomotives and open-platform passenger coaches between the termini of Benevento and Cancello. Only in 1927 did an agreement with FS finally allow shared use of the Cancello–Naples section, eliminating the inconvenient transfer.

During the 1930s, the railway acquired German-built railcars manufactured by Stanga/MAN, enabling faster services. The Benevento Appia locomotive depot was also opened during this period.

The line suffered severe damage during World War II; in 1943, retreating German troops rendered much of the infrastructure unusable. Reconstruction began in 1947.

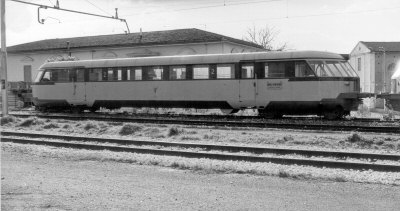
Breda ALn 56.401 railcar at Benevento Appia station in November 1972.

Between the late 1940s and early 1950s, seven ALb 56 Breda railcars damaged during the war were acquired from FS. During reconstruction, these units were fitted with diesel engines and reclassified as ALn 56.401–407.

In 1955, electrification works began using 3,000 V DC, which were completed in 1959; simplified telephone block signalling was subsequently installed. From that year, the line was also used by the “Freccia del Molise” service on the Naples–Campobasso route, which ran until 2005.

In 1971, the railway was placed under governmental commissarial administration. Second-hand electric rolling stock was acquired from other Italian railway administrations, including SEPSA of Naples, which transferred former ACIT vehicles from the Pisa–Tirrenia–Livorno railway (trainsets EP201+RP021, EP202+RP022, EP203+RP023, and trailer coaches RP024 and RP025).

The 1980 Irpinia earthquake damaged the passenger building at Benevento Appia station and several other structures along the line; the station was rebuilt in 1987. In 1984, trainset EP202+RP022 was equipped with a new electronic traction control system. In 1994, a short 700-metre route deviation was opened between the former Apollosa–San Leucio halt and Pontecorvo, bypassing an unstable section by means of a viaduct.

In 2003, the Benevento Pontecorvo–Castelpoto halt was opened; it was later closed in 2018. Following the reorganization of railway services in line with European Union directives, the line became part of the MetroCampania NordEst network in 2005, while train operations continued to rely on telephone block signalling.

From 2011, railway services on public holidays were suspended and replaced by buses.

On 27 December 2012, MetroCampania NordEst, together with SEPSA and Circumvesuviana SpA, was merged into the Ente Autonomo Volturno (EAV), which assumed management of the line.

On 9 February 2018, a landslide affecting the track infrastructure led to the suspension of rail services between San Martino Valle Caudina and Benevento, which were replaced by buses. Train services resumed on 19 November 2018. On 16 March 2020, services were again suspended following two derailments occurring within a few days during regular operation; the line reopened on 23 November 2020.

Since 8 March 2021, rail services have been suspended and replaced by buses to allow for modernisation and extraordinary maintenance works on the line.

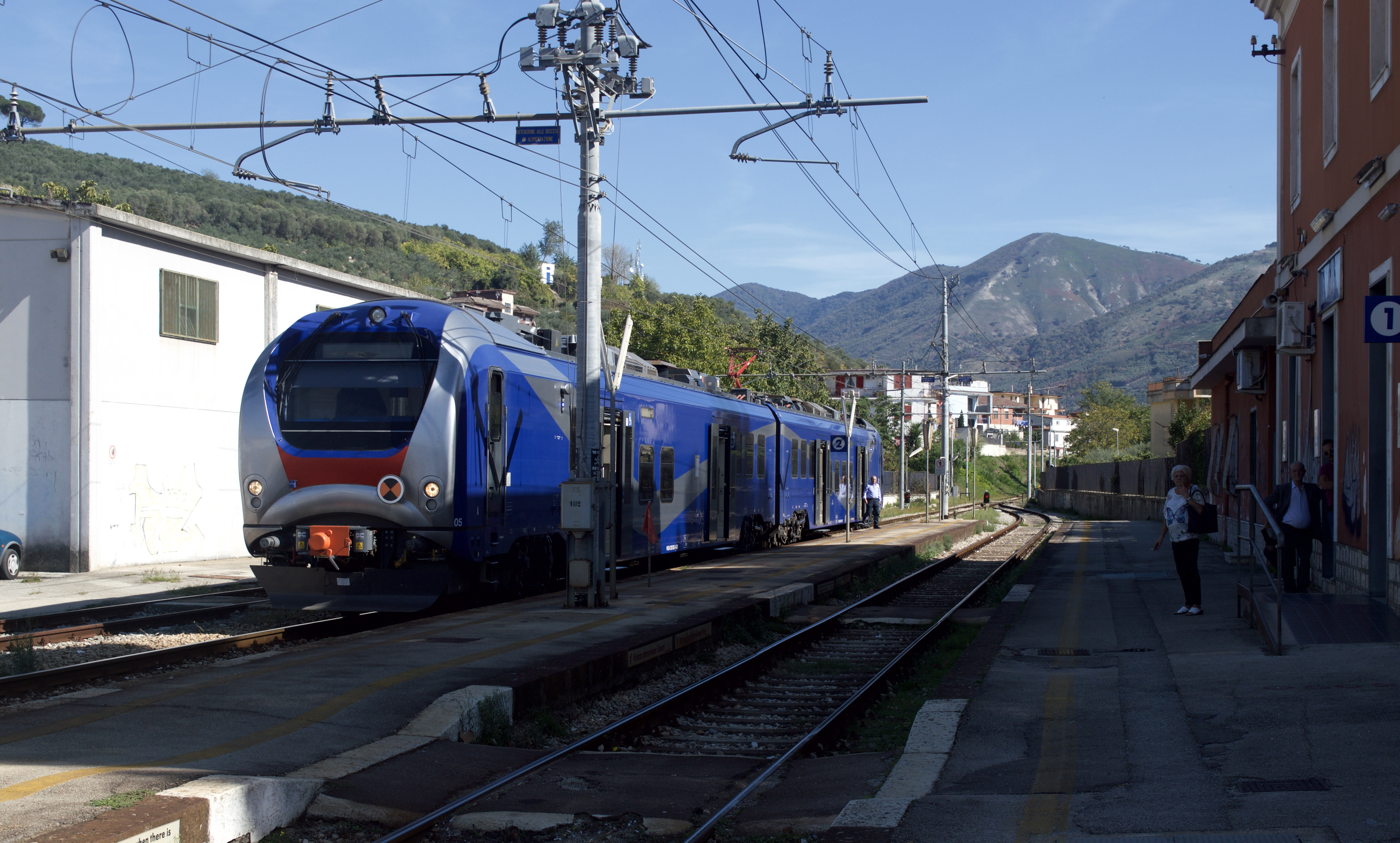
Alfa 2 at Santa Maria a Vico station.

== See also ==
- List of railway lines in Italy

== Sources ==
- Atlante ferroviario d'Italia e Slovenia [Railway atlas of Italy and Slovenia] (in Italian). Cologne: Schweers + Wall. 2010. ISBN 978-3-89494-129-1.
