= Casalduni =

- Comune
- Comune di Casalduni
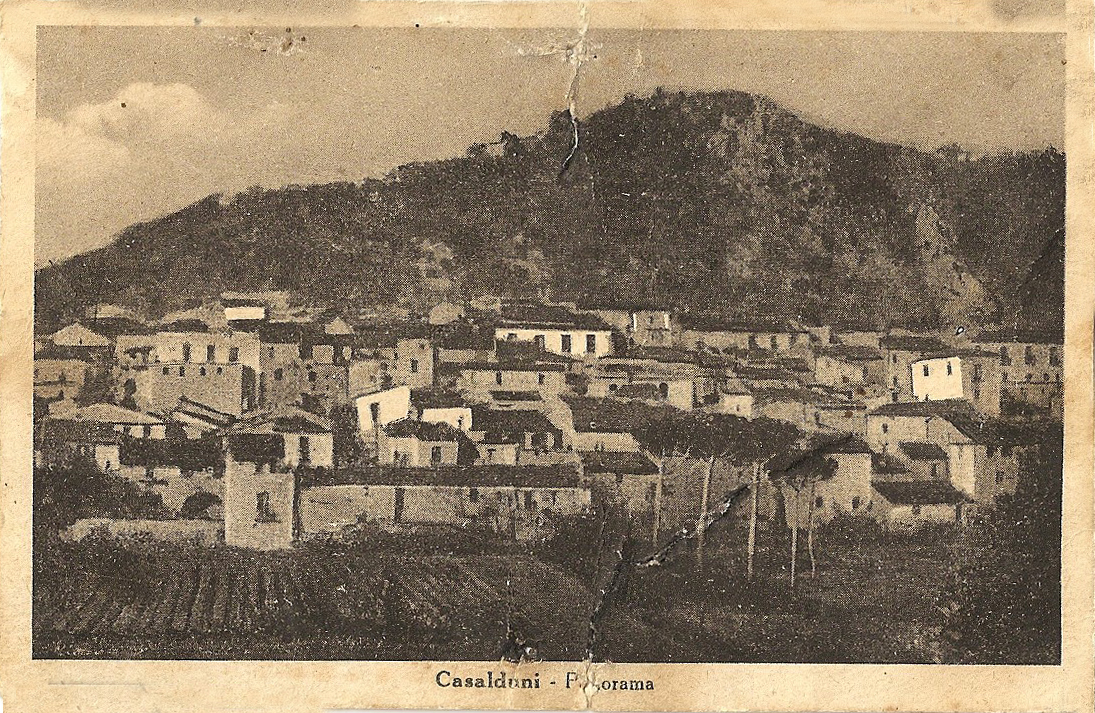
- The skyline of Casalduni in 1944

- Coat of arms

- Location within Italy Location within Campania
- Country: Italy
- Region: Campania
- Province: Benevento (BN)
- Frazioni: Acquaro, Brendice, Capitorto, Casale, Cerconi, Collemarino, Collemastarzo, Crocella, Cuolli, Ferrarisi, Gentile, Lanzate, Macella, Pescomandarino, Pezzalonga, Piana, Prato, San Fortunato, Santa Maria, Tacceto, Vado della Lota, Vaglie, Zingolella

Area
  - Total: 23.2 km^{2} (9.0 sq mi)
- Elevation: 300 m (980 ft)

Population (1 January 2020)
  - Total: 1,293
  - Density: 55.7/km^{2} (144/sq mi)
- Demonym: Casaldunesi
- Time zone: UTC+1 (CET)
  - Summer (DST): UTC+2 (CEST)
- Postal code: 82030
- Dialing code: 0824
- ISTAT code: 062015
- Patron saint: Our Lady of Mount Carmel
- Saint day: 16 July
- Website: Official website

Casalduni is a comune (municipality) in the Province of Benevento in the Italian region Campania, located about 60 km northeast of Naples and about 15 km northwest of Benevento, on the slopes of Monte Cicco on the right of the Tammaro river.

== History ==
Casalduni is mostly remembered as the location, along with Pontelandolfo, of a massacre of largely civilian population by the Piedmontese occupation troops in 1861.

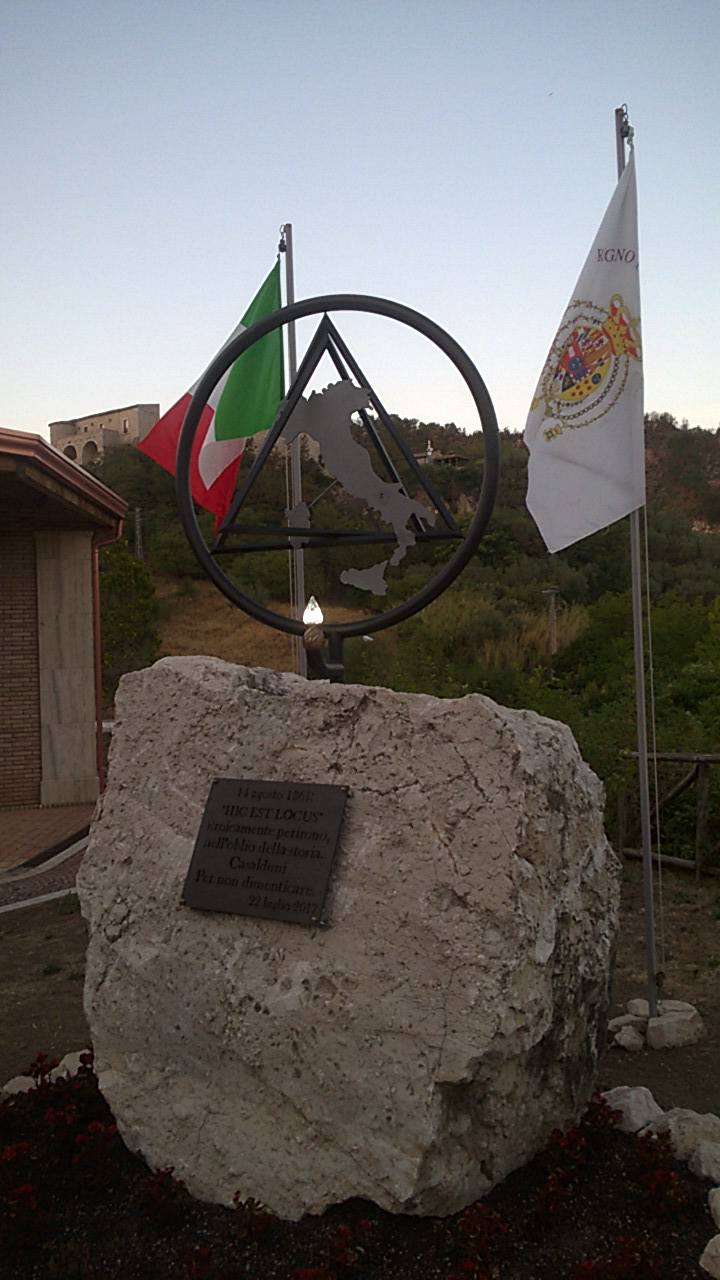
Memorial remembering the Casalduni and Pontelandoldo massacre (1861)
