= Pontelandolfo =

- Comune
- Comune di Pontelandolfo
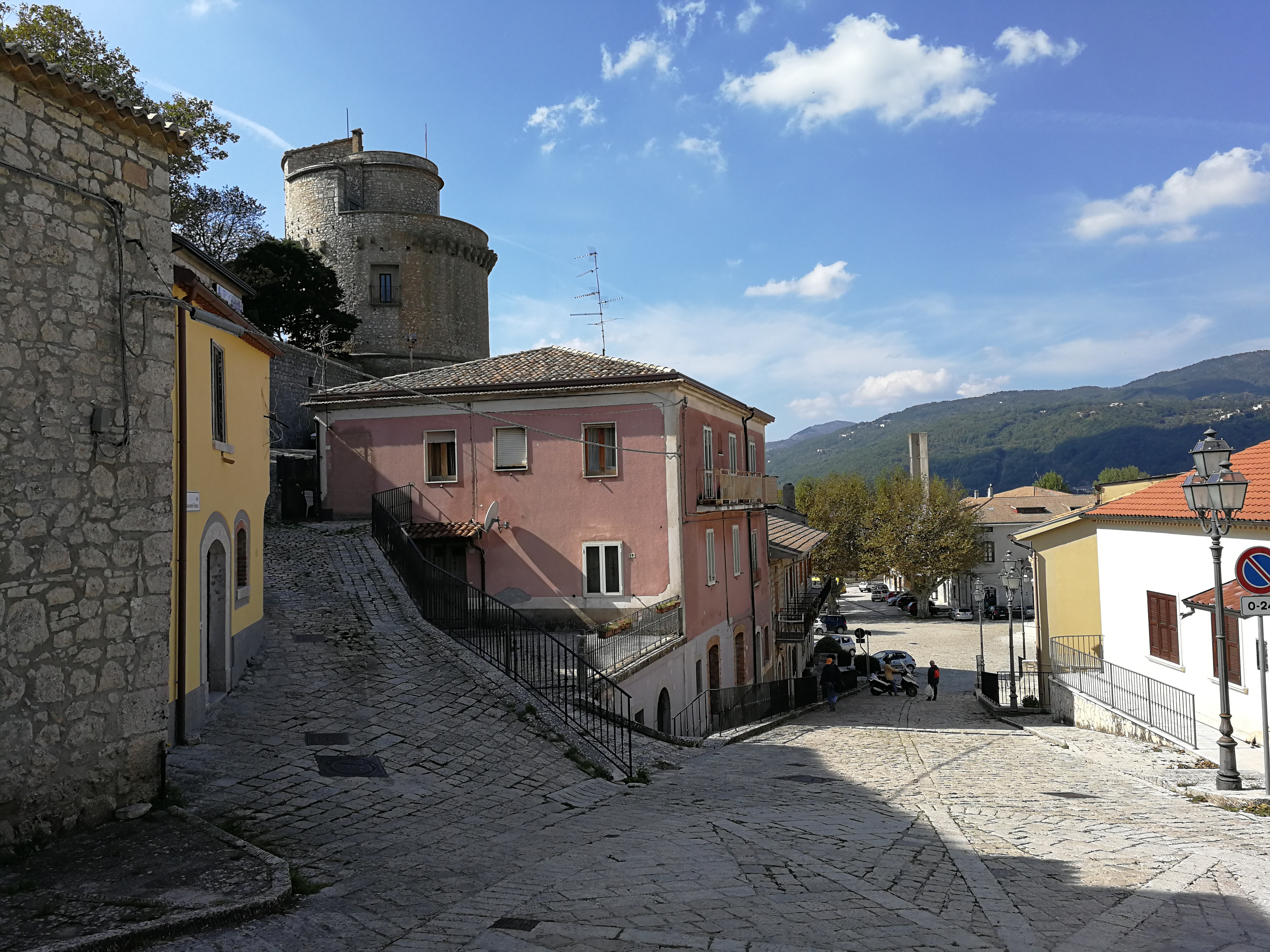

- Flag

- Location within Italy Location within Campania
- Coordinates: 41°17′N 14°41′E
- Country: Italy
- Region: Campania
- Province: Benevento (BN)
- Frazioni: Acqua del Campo, Carluni, Ciccotto, Giallonardo, Grotte, Guitto, Lena, Malepara, Marziello, Pianelle, Pontelandolfo Scalo, Pontenuovo, Santa Caterina, Santillo, Sorgenza

Government
  - Mayor: Gianfranco Rinaldi

Area
  - Total: 28 km^{2} (11 sq mi)
- Elevation: 510 m (1,670 ft)

Population (1 January 2022)
  - Total: 1,989
  - Density: 71/km^{2} (180/sq mi)
- Demonym: Pontelandolfesi
- Time zone: UTC+1 (CET)
  - Summer (DST): UTC+2 (CEST)
- Postal code: 82027
- Dialing code: 0824
- ISTAT code: 062054
- Patron saint: Saint Donato and Saint Anthony
- Saint day: 7 August and 13 June
- Website: Official website

Pontelandolfo is an Italian town and comune in the Sannio Hills in the province of Benevento, approximately halfway between Naples and Campobasso.

== Geography ==
Pontelandolfo is located in a mountainous area of Italy. The area that surrounds Pontelandolfo has a wide range of altitudes (400-1,017 meters), with the centre of population situated at 525 metres.

There are three prominent mountains that surround Pontelandolfo. These include Mount Calvello, which has an altitude of 1,017 metres, Toppo Mangialardo (917 m) and Mount Forgioso (850 m).

== History ==
A legend holds that the town was founded by the Samnites in honor of Hercules, and that it lived in prosperity until the Roman conquest in the 3rd century BC. The name of the village comes from the legendary Pontis Landulphi, or the "Bridge of Landolfo". According to one tradition, it was named after a soldier who died defending the bridge against the Romans while the villagers fled to safety, an event memorialized in the village's crest. Alternatively, Landolfo was a Lombard bishop who built the bridge in the early medieval period. The bridge is believed to have spanned the Alenta Creek, whose source is the Calore Irpino.

According to local ancient folklore, the regional surname Guerrera, derived from the Latin spelling Gverrera meaning warrior or man of war, is said to have origins dating back to the soldier who died defending the bridge against the Romans. The Guerrera clan for centuries inhabited the fertile lands south of the Alenta Creek stretching between San Lupo and Pontelandolfo centred in and around the current village of Giallonardo.

In 862, Pontelandolfo suffered an attack by Arab raiders. In 1138, it was besieged by the Normans, which caused a destructive fire. The Aragonese besieged the town in 1461. Earthquakes affected the town in 1349, 1456, and 1688. In 1806, the town was attacked by French forces.

Pontelandolfo was a part of the Duchy of Benevento, a Papal-controlled enclave within the territory of the Kingdom of the Two Sicilies, until the Two Sicilies were annexed to the new Italian kingdom with the plebiscite of 21 October 1860.

=== 1861 massacre ===
On 7 August 1861, a large number of the town's inhabitants, encouraged by the presence of a bandit group, ordered the town priest to sing a Te Deum dedicated to the deposed Bourbon king. They then ransacked the local headquarters of the National Guard, freed prisoners from the local jail, and destroyed the registers of birth in the town hall to disrupt conscription. They then looted the homes of rich landowners, who had all left the previous day. A tax collector and a man suspected of being a Piedmontese "spy" were lynched. A detachment of bersaglieri was sent to investigate the situation and entered the town, but they were forced out the angry townspeople. While trying to reach San Lupo, the bersaglieri were attacked by armed peasants in the vicinity of Casalduni, and 41 of them were killed. The attack is suspected to have been organised by the influential landowner Achille Iacobelli, ostensibly to create a chaotic situation and "pose as the guardian of law and order."

A force led by the officer Carlo Melegari and Colonel Pier Eleonoro Negri was sent to reduce Pontelandolfo and Casalduni to "a heap of rubble". As the people of Casalduni had been warned about the coming attack, only three people were present in the settlement, all of whom were killed by Melegari's soldiers. Negri's troops attacked Pontelandolfo on the morning of 14 August 1861 with orders to shoot everyone except women, children, and the sick, although the violence became indiscriminate. Negri's men were also encouraged to plunder at will. Some estimate the number of people killed as between 100 and 200; other estimates are higher. In the subsequent months, many people from Casalduni and Pontelandolfo who had avoided the massacre were arrested; 573 were tried, of whom 146 received sentences of hard labour or life imprisonment. Casalduni and Pontelandolfo were effectively destroyed, leaving about 3,000 people homeless.

The Italian press mostly emphasised the initial attack on Italian troops and justified the punitive attacks on the two towns. Giuseppe Ferrari, a member of parliament from Milan, visited the town and reported some of his findings in parliament. He was shouted down by other members of parliament when he described the events in southern Italy as amounting to "civil war"; he was told that the violence in the south was solely a result of "brigandage". In 1973, a street in Pontelandolfo was named in Ferrari's honour.

=== Emigration ===
Many villagers emigrated to the United States, with a large community settling in and around Waterbury, Connecticut, where they founded the Pontelandolfo Community Club. A large number also moved to Canada, specifically to the city of Montreal. A significant number also emigrated to Australia from the end of World War II to the early 1970s and settled predominantly on Sydney's North Shore and Eastern Suburbs area, and whose family surnames include: Guerrera; Orsini; Mucciacciaro; Rubbo; and Mancini. A small number also settled in and around Melbourne. The early Australian emigrants worked in the Queensland sugar cane fields before moving to Sydney, where they settled and were later joined by their extended families.

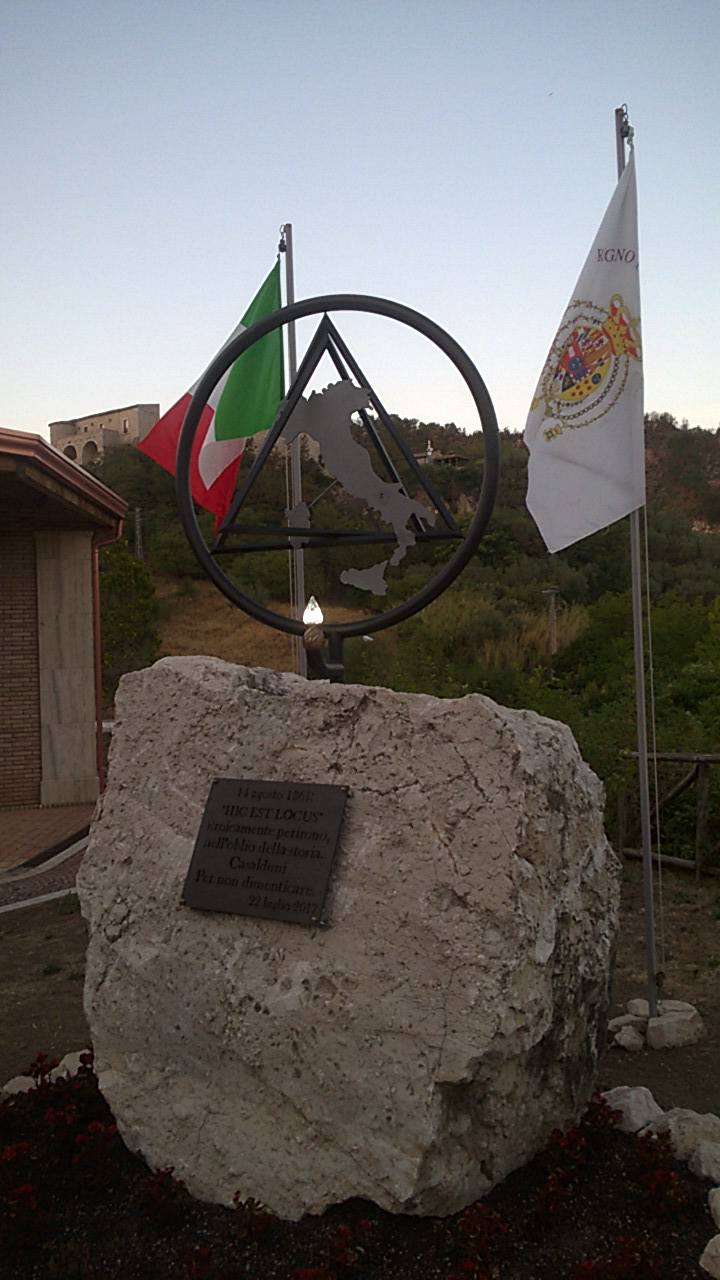
Memorial remembering the Pontelandolfo and Casalduni massacre (1861)

== Main sights ==
- Medieval tower (12th century)
- Church of Annunziata Antica (15th century)
- Chapel of San Rocco (17th-18th centuries)

== Economy ==
Much of the surrounding area of Pontelandolfo (14.91 km^{2}) is used for agriculture thanks to the fertility of the ground, which was already well known by the ancient Greeks. The primary use of the land is for olive-tree orchards, pastures and for the culture of cereals.

== Twin towns ==
Pontelandolfo is twinned with:

- (United States) Waterbury, USA
