= Monte Ricco =

Mountain in Italy

Coordinates: 45°15′15″N 11°44′33″E

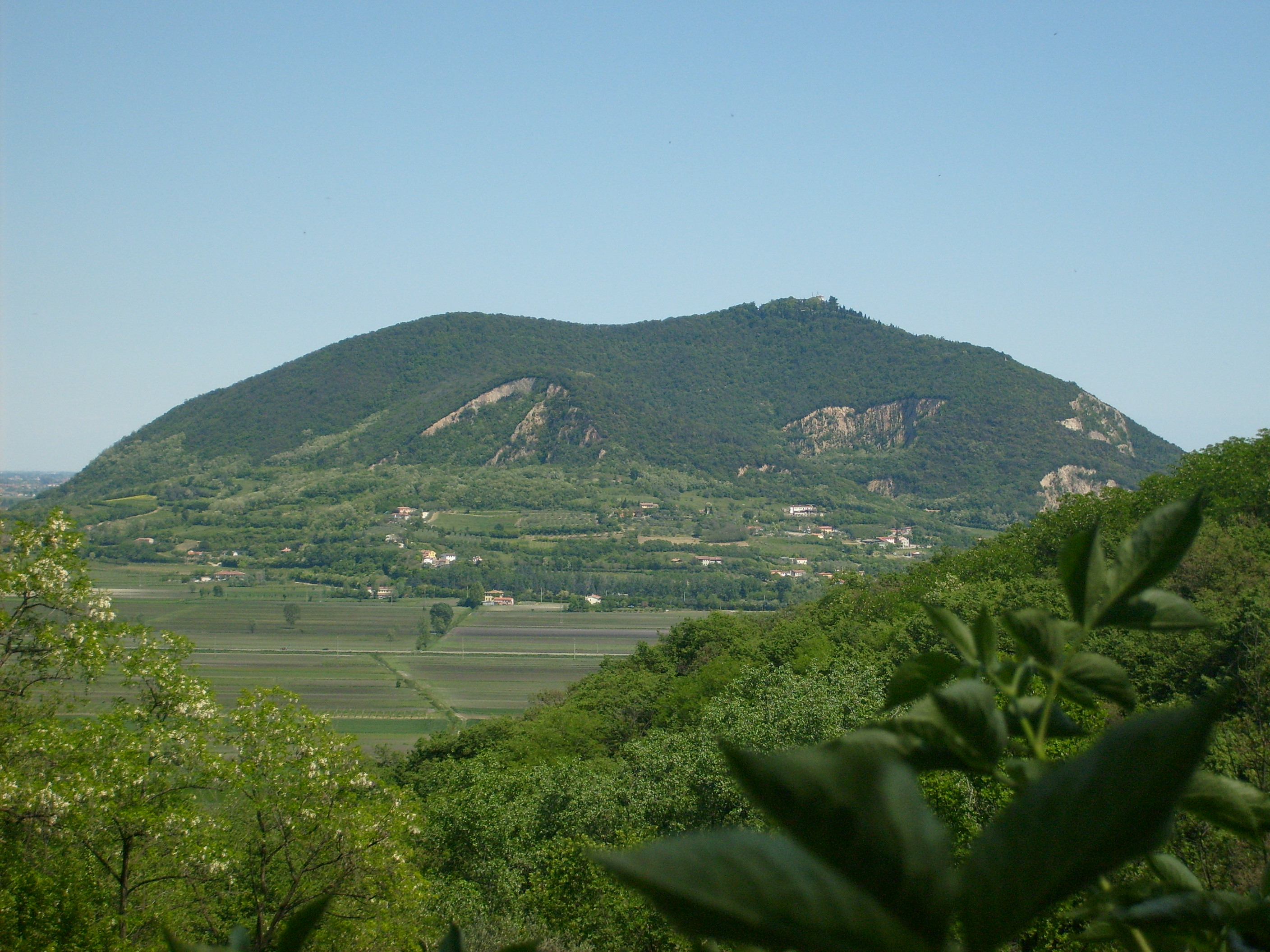

Highest point
- Elevation: 330 m (1,080 ft)

Geography
- Location: Veneto, Italy

Monte Ricco is a mountain of the Veneto region of Italy. It has an elevation of 330 metres.

Monte Ricci is a popular destination for day hiking.
