= Naples–Foggia railway =

Railway line in Italy

Overview
- Owner: RFI
- Locale: Apulia, Campania, Italy
- Termini: Napoli Centrale; Foggia

Service
- Operator: Trenitalia

History
- Opened: 1867

Technical
- Line length: 194 km (121 mi)
- Track gauge: 1,435 mm (4 ft 8 1/2 in) standard gauge
- Electrification: 3000 V DC

The Naples–Foggia railway is an Italian railway line connecting Naples, in Campania, with Foggia, in Apulia, crossing the Apennines at the saddle of Ariano through a series of tunnels.

The railway infrastructure is managed by the Rete Ferroviaria Italiana, which classifies it as one of its primary lines. It is part of a westward extension of Pan-European Corridor VIII.

It is being developed as a line with features of high-speed rail with the doubling of single-track sections and the raising of line speeds to between 180 km/h and 200 km/h. These improvements are intended to allow connections between Naples and Bari in two hours and between Rome and Bari in three hours in 2026.

== History ==
=== Construction ===
Section	Opened
Bovino–Foggia	27 January 1867
Naples–Caserta	7 May 1867
Caserta–Casalduni	15 March 1868
Casalduni–Benevento	18 April 1868
Benevento–Santo Spirito	1 August 1868
Savignano–Bovino	1 August 1868
Starza–Pianerottolo	25 January 1869
Savignano–Pianerottolo	12 June 1869
Santo Spirito–Starza	26 May 1870
Telese–Telese Bagni branch	15 July 1883

The Società per le Strade Ferrate Meridionali ("Company for the Southern Railways") obtained a concession for the construction and operation of a railway that linked the Adriatic to the Tyrrhenian Sea, connecting Foggia to Naples, under the "Bastogi" law of 1862 that enabled the foundation of the company (law no. 763).

In the previous decade, a railway project to connect Caserta with Foggia, taking advantage of the just completed Rome–Cassino–Naples railway, had been proposed to the government of the Kingdom of the Two Sicilies. The project subsequently collapsed due to political and financial problems. However the Società Meridionali preferred to resume that project rather than build a new line that started from Naples and crossed the Valle Caudina. Work began at both ends of the line.

The first section to be opened for operation was between Bovino and Foggia, on 27 January 1867, followed by several sections in the following year: Caserta–Casalduni (15 March), Casalduni–Benevento (18 April), Savignano–Bovino and Benevento–Santo Spirito (1 August). In 1869, these were followed by the sections between Starza and Pianerottolo (25 January) and between Pianerottolo and Savignano (12 June). The line was completed on 26 May 1870 with the opening of the section between Santo Spirito and Starza.

On the night of 29–30 September 1889 the line was the site of the Pianerottolo d'Ariano accident which caused two deaths and seven serious injuries due to a head-on collision between two trains inside the Ariano tunnel.

The Ferrovie dello Stato took over the operation of the line following the nationalisation of the railways, including the lines built by the Società Meridionale, in 1906.

=== Electrification ===
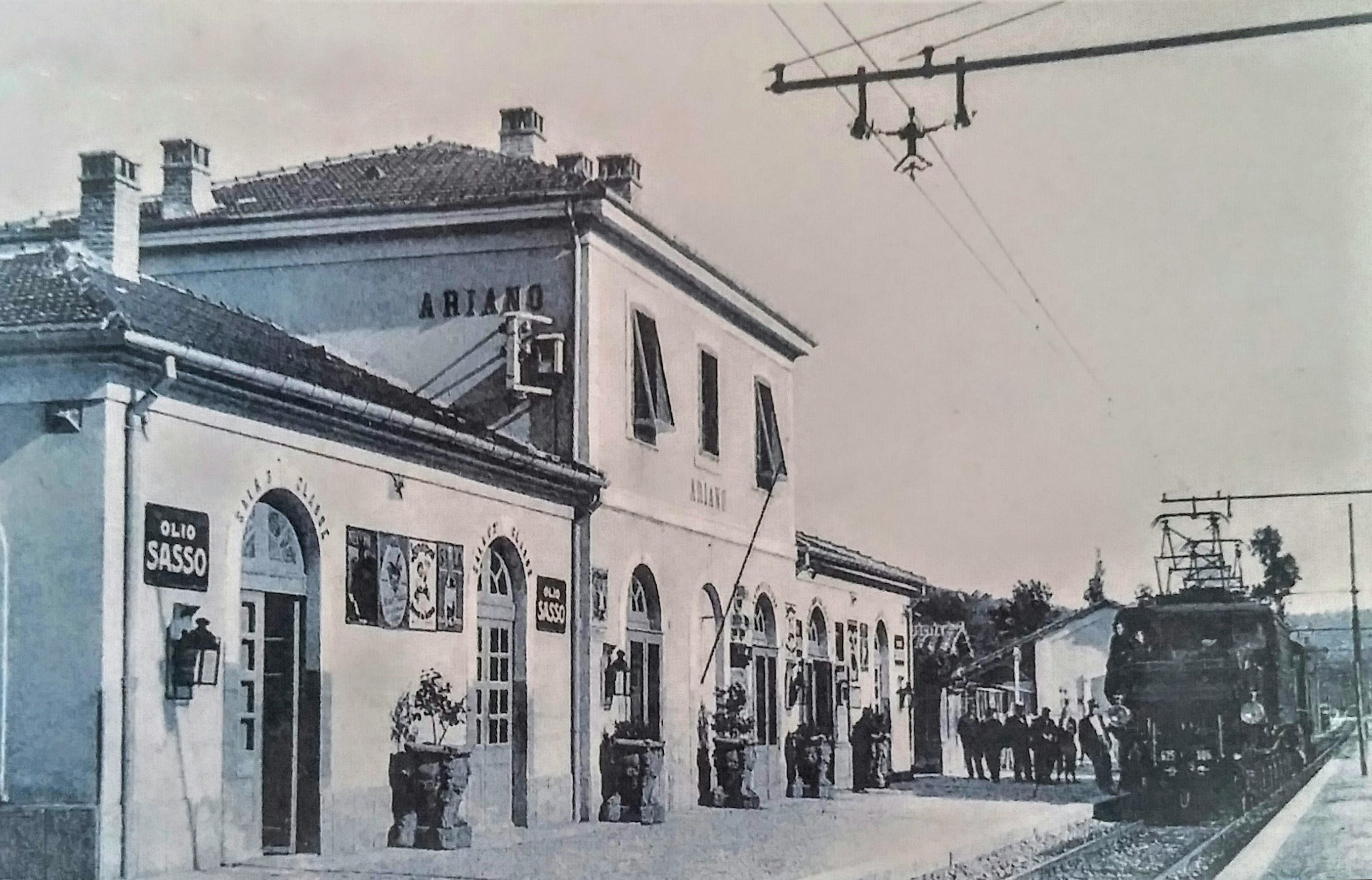
The newly electrified Ariano Irpino station

The Benevento–Foggia section was the first line to be electrified at 3000 volts DC. The piling and the catenary were installed between 1926 and 1928. Test runs began in September 1927, with trains pulled by FS Class E.626 electric locomotives. Regular electric operations began on 1 March 1928. (Note: According to some sources, the tests began on 29 September 1927.) Electrification was extended to Caserta and Naples in 1931.

=== Track duplication ===
Duplication of the line began in the 1990s. The new section between Vitulano and Apice was opened on 3 December 1997, replacing a more tortuous route. On the same day, the old Vitulano station, which was on the old route, was closed and replaced by the new Vitulano station, which has also since closed.

Adaptation of the whole line to "high capacity" (Alta Capacità) standards by 2026 is under way on several sections.

In July 2015, a link was activated that allows a direct connect to the Adriatic railway without reversal in Foggia.

In addition, a deviation was opened that connects Bovino with Foggia without passing through Cervaro station, which is now only used as a crossing loop. Work on the first segment (18.5 km) was completed in December 2012, while the entire section (23 km) was completed in 2016 and opened on 28 June 2017.

On 15 September 2025, the single-track section between Caserta and Frasso Telesino was decommissioned, bringing an end to train services passing beneath the scenic Aqueduct of Vanvitelli. At the same time, a new double-track section between Cancello and Frasso Telesino was brought into service, eliminating the need for trains travelling between Naples and Foggia and back to reverse at Caserta station. Following the opening of the first track on 27 September, the second track was activated on 15 February 2026.

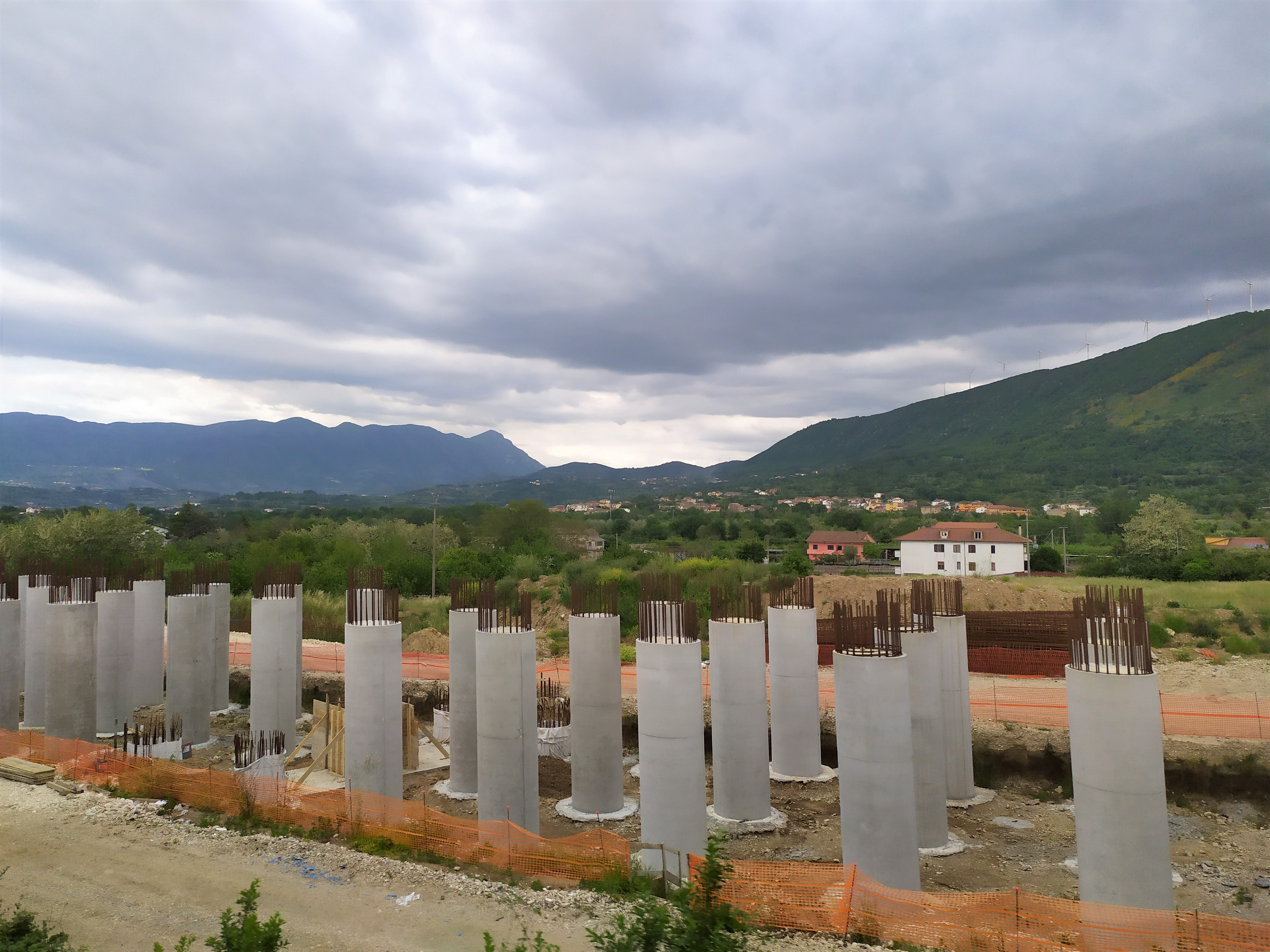
Construction works near Valle di Maddaloni in 2020

Further work is planned as follows:

- the doubling of the existing section between Frasso Telesino and Vitulano, together with any changes to the track necessary to achieve the "high capacity" standard;
- the adaptation of the already double-track section between Vitulano and Apice to the "high capacity" standard;
- the construction of a double-track deviation passing south of the current line. The new route will start from the now closed Apice station and will go up the Ufita river to the Santa Sofia plain (in the municipal area of Ariano Irpino) where a new station called "Hirpinia" will be built, serving the district and the industrial area of the Ufita valley. The line will continue north, crossing the Apennine watershed through an approximately 25 km-long tunnel: it will come to the surface in the Cervaro valley near Montaguto and then rejoin the current line near Orsara di Puglia station;
- the construction of a new double-track line parallel to the current one between Orsara di Puglia and Bovino;
- the adaptation to the "high capacity" standard of the Cervaro–Foggia section which, like the Vitulano–Apice section (to be adapted for higher speeds) and the Bovino–Cervaro section (already completed), already has two tracks.

== Standards ==
The railway is single track with the exception of the Naples–Frasso Telesino, Vitulano–Benevento–Apice and Bovino–Foggia sections. The line is electrified at 3000 volts DC.

=== Traffic control ===
Railway traffic on the section between Naples/Caserta and Cervaro is regulated by an operations centre manager (Dirigente Centrale Operativo) based in Napoli Centrale, while between Cervaro and Foggia, operations are entrusted to local station masters.

== Rail traffic ==
Most passenger traffic is carried by medium to long distance trains, with 10 ETR 1000 and 2 ETR 600 Frecciarossa services serving Caserta, Benevento and Foggia, two ETR 485 Frecciargento services serving Caserta and Benevento, and four InterCity services that also stop in Telese-Cerreto and Ariano Irpino.

Regional traffic between Caserta and Benevento is modest and was initially operated by Aln 663 and 668 railcars, and by low-floor carriages hauled by E.464 locomotives, with the addition of the Minuetto diesel multiple units in 2004. In 2015 a pair of Jazz electric multiple units entered service on the Naples–Benevento section, together with a pair of Swing diesel multiple units on the Benevento–Caserta–Campobasso route.

The Benevento–Foggia section has had no local services since 2010, therefore all the stations on the section (with the exception of Ariano Irpino, which are served by four InterCity services) still exist but are unused.
