= Caserta railway station =

Railway station in Caserta, Campania, Italy

Caserta
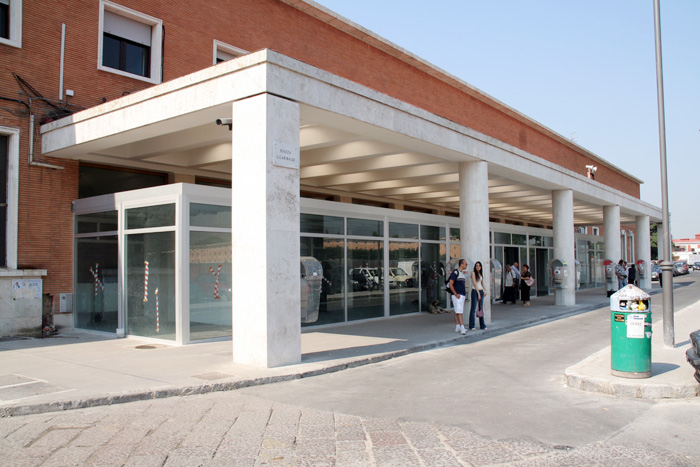
- View of the passenger building.

General information
- Location: Piazza Giuseppe Garibaldi; 81100 Caserta CE; Caserta, Caserta, Campania; Italy
- Coordinates: 41°04′08″N 14°19′40″E
- Operator: Rete Ferroviaria Italiana; Centostazioni
- Lines: Rome–Cassino–Naples; Naples–Foggia
- Distance: 163.400 km (101.532 mi) from Foggia
- Train operators: Trenitalia
- Connections: Urban and suburban buses

Other information
- IATA code: CTJ
- Classification: Gold

History
- Opened: 20 December 1843; 182 years ago
Location
- Location within Campania Location within Italy

Caserta railway station (IATA: CTJ) (Italian: Stazione di Caserta) serves the city and comune of Caserta, in the region of Campania, southern Italy. Opened in 1843, it forms the junction between the Rome–Cassino–Naples railway and the Naples–Foggia railway.

The station is currently managed by Rete Ferroviaria Italiana (RFI). However, the commercial area of the passenger building is managed by Centostazioni. Train services are operated by Trenitalia. Each of these companies is a subsidiary of Ferrovie dello Stato (FS), Italy's state-owned rail company.

== Location ==
Caserta railway station is situated at Piazza Giuseppe Garibaldi, to the south west of the city centre.

== History ==
The station was opened on 20 December 1843, upon the inauguration of the Naples–Caserta section of the Rome–Cassino–Naples railway. It was built just opposite the Royal Palace of Caserta, to allow the sovereign to reach it more easily.

On 26 May 1844, the station became a through station, when the next section of the Rome–Cassino–Naples railway was completed, between Caserta and Capua.

From the very beginning, the station played a key role in local and national transport, both for passenger and freight traffic. For a time, it was also served by a connector line (now disused) direct to the industrial area of the city.

In recent years, there has been major modernisation work, including the deletion of a level crossing near the end of the platforms and the opening of an underpass. In addition, a huge underground car park was built at the nearby Piazza Carlo III.

== Features ==
The passenger building is now a modern, two-level structure with a wide entrance and many windows. It hosts several services, all in large rooms, including ticketing, a bar, luggage storage and the office of the railway police.

In the station yard, there are six through tracks used for passenger services, of which one is reserved for light rail service. The tracks are equipped with platforms and attached benches and shelters. The platforms are connected with each other by a pedestrian underpass.

The station also has a goods shed served by several tracks, even though there is no longer any goods service.

Elsewhere in the station yard, there is a locomotive workshop.

== Gallery ==
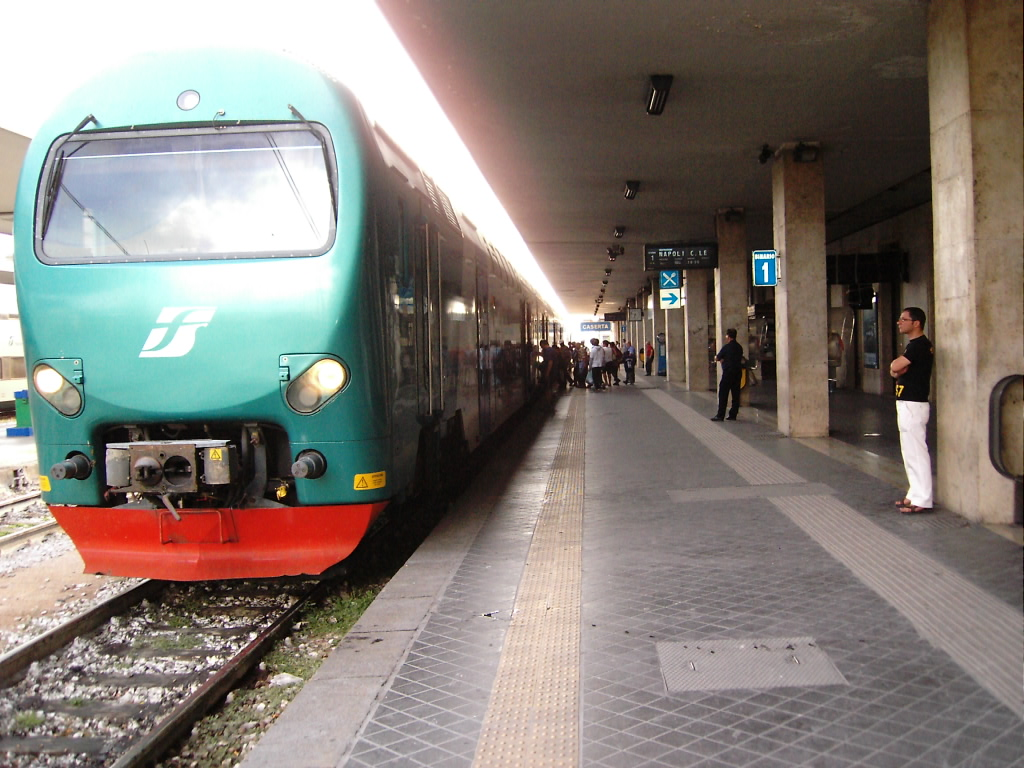
Station yard, view of platform 1 looking towards Naples.

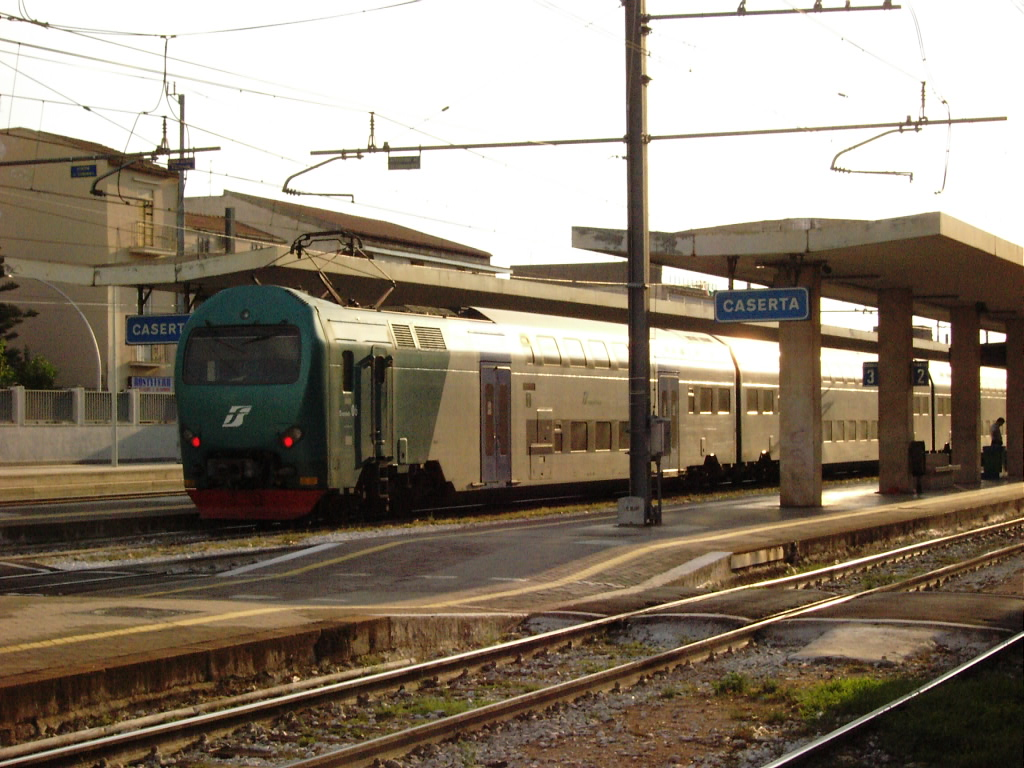
Station yard, platforms 4 and 3.

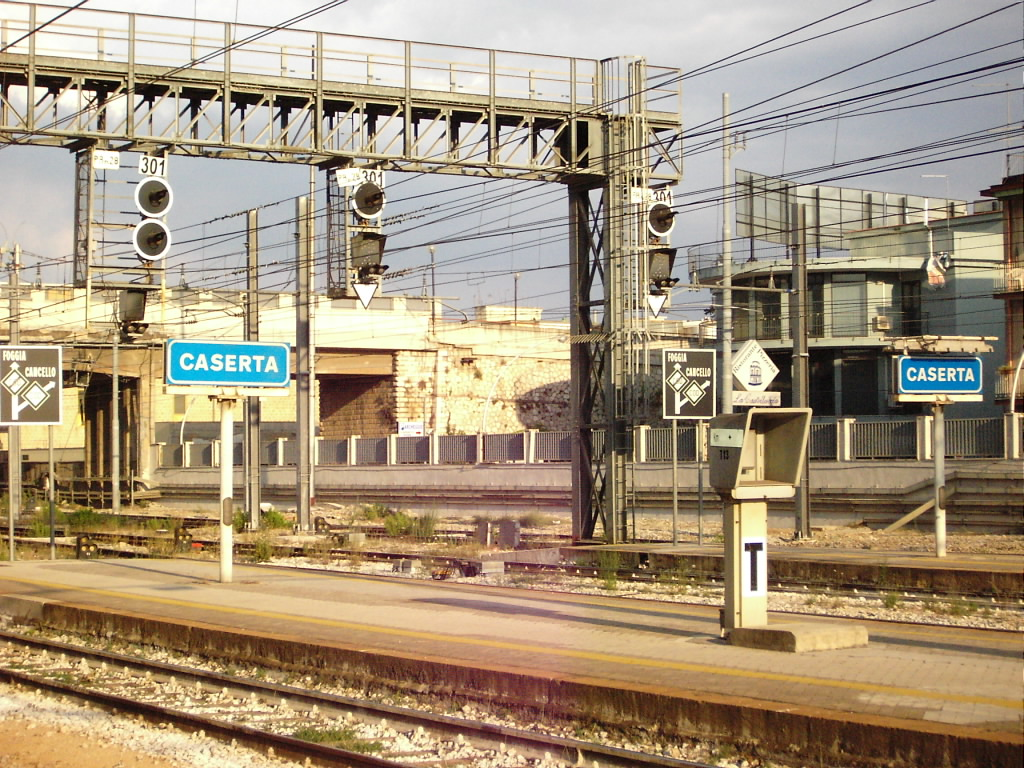
Looking towards Foggia and Cancello.

== Train services ==
The station has about 5.4 million passenger movements each year. These movements are made up mostly of commuters, especially workers and students, but also of tourists who come to see the area, including the Palace, which has been a UNESCO World Heritage Site since 1997.

All passenger trains passing through the station stop there, including Eurostar Italia and InterCity trains.

The station is also the terminus of many regional trains to and from Napoli Centrale, Benevento and Piedimonte Matese. In the immediate future, some trains will be able to reach Napoli Campi Flegrei using the Villa Literno–Napoli Gianturco railway.

The station is served by the following services (incomplete):

- High speed services (Eurostar Frecciargento) Rome - Foggia - Bari - Brindisi - Lecce
- Intercity services Rome - Foggia - Bari (- Taranto)
- Night train (Intercity Night) Rome - Foggia - Bari - Brindisi - Lecce

== Interchange ==
From the bus station at the nearby underground car park, many buses leave for neighboring destinations such as Capodrise, Portico di Caserta, Curti, Capua, Santa Maria Capua Vetere and many others.

== See also ==
- History of rail transport in Italy
- List of railway stations in Campania
- Rail transport in Italy
- Railway stations in Italy
