= Cancello–Benevento railway =

Railway line in Italy

Overview
- Status: in use
- Owner: Rete Ferroviaria Italiana
- Locale: Campania, Italy
- Termini: Cancello; Benevento

Service
- Type: Heavy rail
- Operator(s): Trenitalia

History
- Opened: 9 March 1891

Technical
- Line length: 103 km (64 mi)
- Number of tracks: 2 (Cancello–Sarno), otherwise 1
- Track gauge: 1,435 mm (4 ft 8 1/2 in) standard gauge
- Electrification: 3 kV DC (Cancello–Codola)

The Cancello–Benevento railway is a railway line in Campania, Italy.

== History ==
The line was opened in several sections as it follows:

- Cancello–Nola on 3 June 1846
- Nola–Sarno on 17 January 1856
- Sarno–Mercato San Severino on 17 February 1861
- Mercato San Severino–Montoro on 1 August 1869
- Montoro–Avellino on 31 March 1879
- Avellino–Prata on 2 September 1886
- Prata–Benevento on 9 March 1891

== See also ==
- List of railway lines in Italy
