= Foggia railway station =

Railway station in Foggia, Italy

Foggia
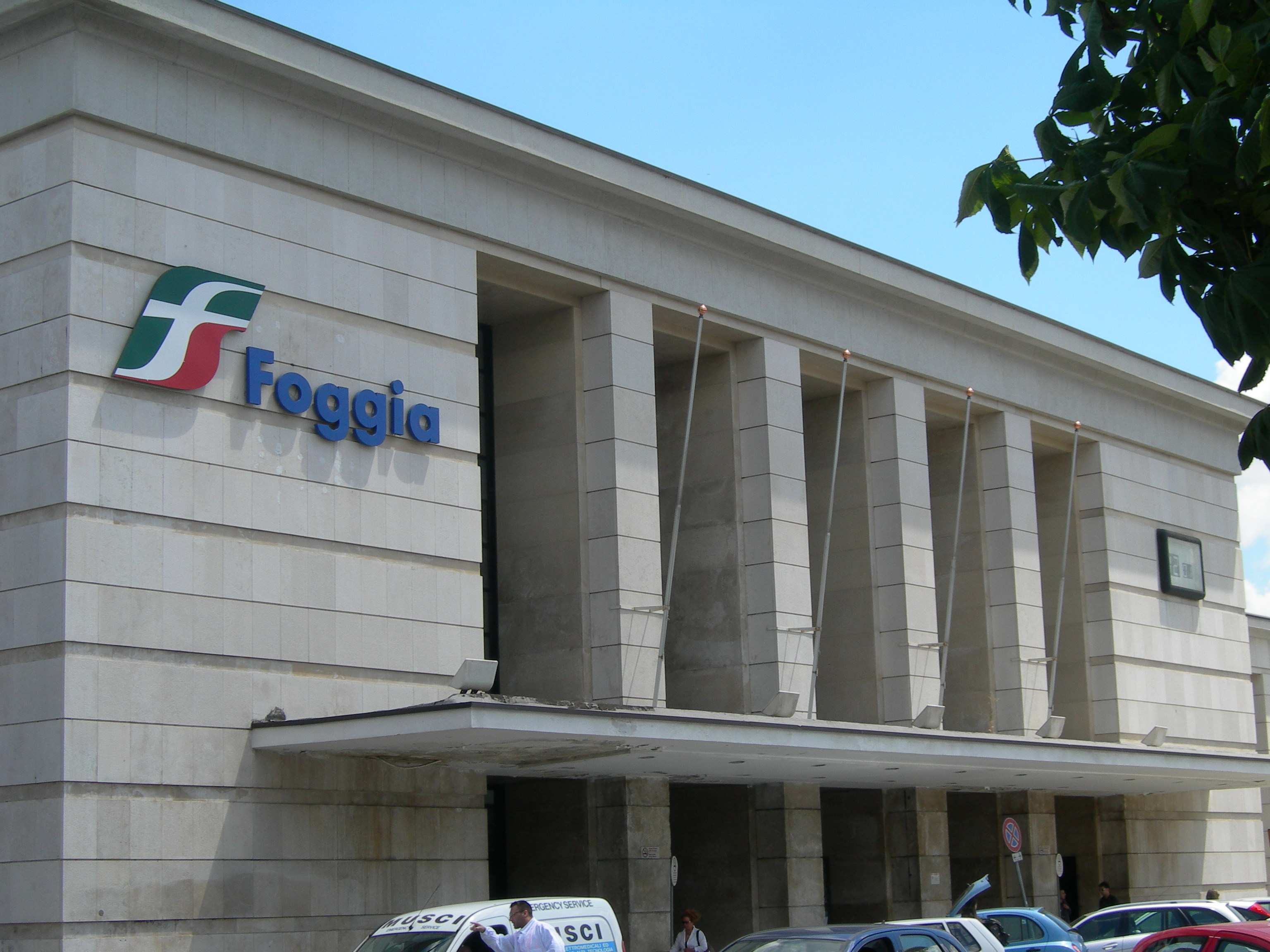
- The passenger building.

General information
- Location: 71121 Foggia; Italy
- Coordinates: 41°27′56″N 15°33′22″E
- Operator: Trenitalia; Ferrovie del Gargano
- Lines: Naples–Foggia; Ancona–Lecce; Foggia–Manfredonia; Lucera–Foggia; Foggia–Potenza
- Distance: 526.027 km (326.858 mi) from Bologna Centrale

Construction
- Architect: Roberto Narducci

Other information
- IATA code: FOI
- Classification: Gold

History
- Opened: 25 April 1864

Services
Location
- Location within Apulia Location within Italy

Foggia railway station (Italian: Stazione di Foggia) (IATA: FOI) serves the city and comune of Foggia, in the region of Apulia, Southern Italy. Opened in 1864, it forms part of the Adriatic Railway (Ancona–Lecce), and is the terminus of the Naples–Foggia railway. It is also a junction for several other, secondary lines, namely the Foggia–Manfredonia, Lucera–Foggia and Foggia–Potenza railways.

The station is currently managed by Rete Ferroviaria Italiana (RFI). However, the commercial area of the passenger building is managed by Centostazioni. Train services are operated by Trenitalia. Each of these companies is a subsidiary of Ferrovie dello Stato (FS), Italy's state-owned rail company.

== Location ==
Foggia railway station is situated at Piazzale Vittorio Veneto, at the north eastern edge of the city centre.

== History ==
The station was opened on 25 April 1864, upon the inauguration of the Ortona–Foggia section of the Adriatic Railway. Just under four months later, on 11 August 1864, the Adriatic Railway was extended from Brindisi to Trani.

On 30 December 1886, Foggia became a junction station, when the first two sections of the Naples–Foggia railway were opened, between Bovino-Deliceto and Foggia via Cervaro. The number of lines terminating at Foggia was expanded on 12 July 1885, with the opening of the Foggia–Manfredonia railway, and again on 2 August 1887, upon the completion of the Lucera–Foggia railway.

On 18 September 1897, a line branching from the Naples–Foggia railway at Cervaro was completed to form a link between Foggia and Potenza. By the end of the nineteenth century, the station had therefore become a crucial junction between the lines that running between the north and south of Italy and those linking the Adriatic and Tyrrhenian seas.

During World War II, the passenger building was severely damaged. It was rebuilt in 1951, as a project of the architect Roberto Narducci.

== Features ==
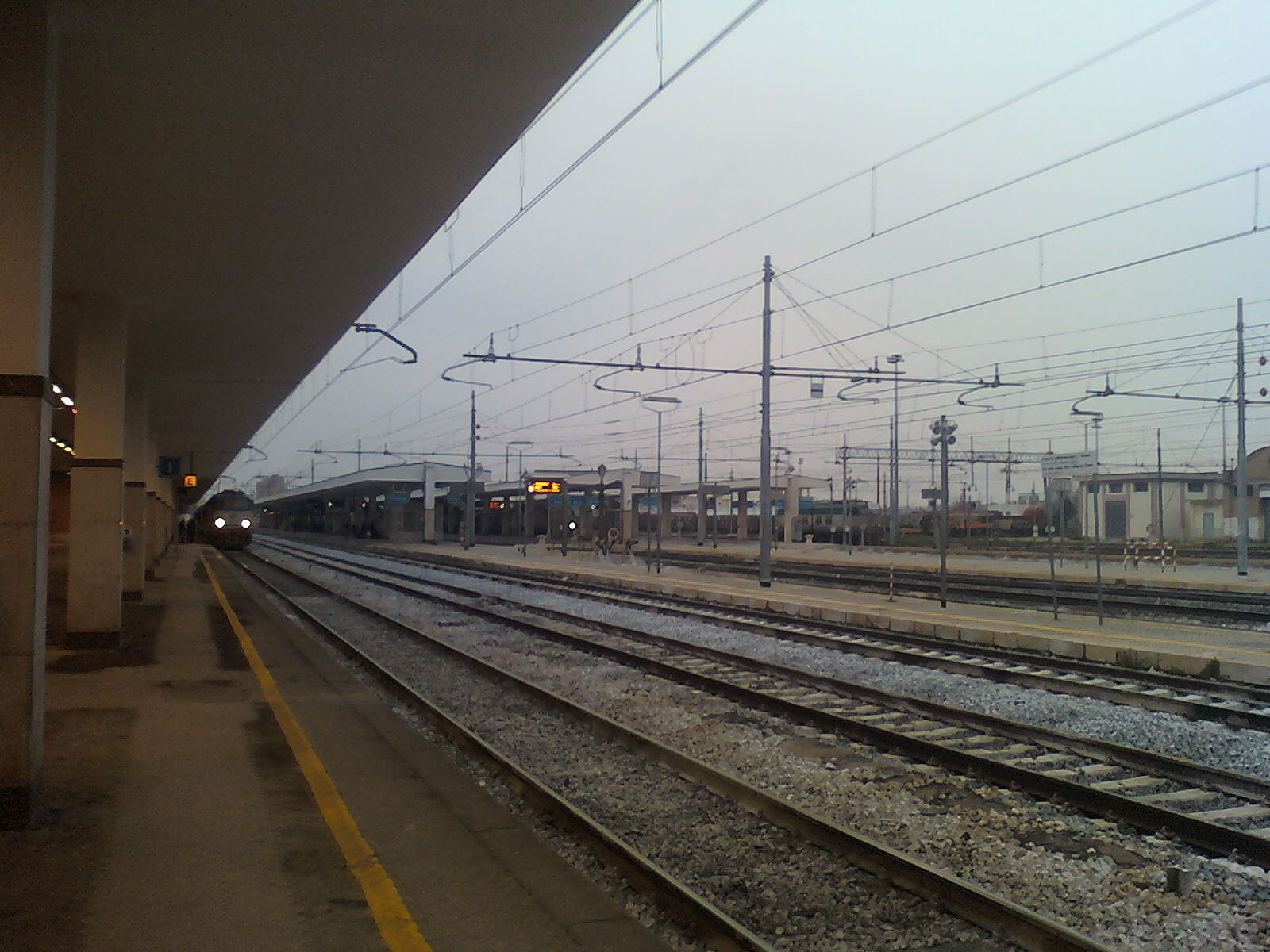
View of the station yard.

The passenger building looks impressive in combination with the piazza in which it stands. It consists of a central section housing the main entrance, and two wings a little set back from it. On the ground floor are passenger services such as ticketing and bar and the office of traffic management and the headquarters of the Railway Police, while the upper floors are occupied by offices of Trenitalia.

In the station yard, there are eight through tracks, interspersed with four platforms equipped with shelters and linked by a subway. Additionally, there are several dock platforms used for passenger traffic.

The station is also equipped with a large goods yard with adjoining buildings and several through tracks used for overtaking.

== Train services ==
The station has about four million passenger movements each year, due mainly to passenger interchanges between different lines. It is therefore the second busiest station in Apulia after Bari Centrale.

The next busiest Apulian stations are Barletta, Brindisi, Lecce and Taranto, respectively.

The station is served by the following services (incomplete):

- High speed services (Frecciargento) Rome - Foggia - Bari - Brindisi - Lecce
- High speed services (Frecciabianca) Milan - Parma - Bologna - Ancona - Pescara - Foggia - Bari - Brindisi - Lecce
- High speed services (Frecciarossa) Milan - Bologna - Ancona - Pescara - Foggia – Bari
- High speed services (Frecciabianca) Milan - Parma - Bologna - Ancona - Pescara - Foggia - Bari - Taranto
- High speed services (Frecciabianca) Turin - Parma - Bologna - Ancona - Pescara - Foggia - Bari - Brindisi - Lecce
- High speed services (Frecciabianca) Venice - Padua - Bologna - Ancona - Pescara - Foggia - Bari - Brindisi - Lecce
- Intercity services Rome - Foggia - Bari (- Taranto)
- Intercity services Bologna - Rimini - Ancona - Pescara - Foggia - Bari - Brindisi - Lecce
- Intercity services Bologna - Rimini - Ancona - Pescara - Foggia - Bari - Taranto
- Night train (Intercity Notte) Rome - Foggia - Bari - Brindisi - Lecce
- Night train (Intercity Notte) Milan - Parma - Bolgona - Ancona - Pescara - Foggia - Bari - Brindisi - Lecce
- Night train (Intercity Notte) Milan - Ancona - Pescara - Foggia - Bari - Taranto - Brindisi - Lecce
- Night train (Intercity Notte) Turin - Alessandria - Bolgona - Ancona - Pescara - Foggia - Bari - Brindisi - Lecce
- Regional services (Treno regionale) Foggia - Barletta - Bari
- Regional services (Treno regionale) Foggia - Melfi - Potenza
- Local services (Treno regionale) San Severo - Foggia
- Local services (Treno regionale) Foggia - Lucera
- Local services (Treno regionale) Foggia - Manfredonia

== See also ==
- History of rail transport in Italy
- List of railway stations in Apulia
- Rail transport in Italy
- Railway stations in Italy
