= Pecorino di Carmasciano =

Italian hard cheese from the Campania region

- Other names: Carmasciano
- Country of origin: Italy
- Region: Campania
- Town: Guardia Lombardi; Rocca San Felice; Frigento
- Source of milk: Laticauda sheep
- Pasteurized: No
- Texture: Hard
- Dimensions: Diameter: 15–20 cm (5.9–7.9 in); Height: 10–12 cm (3.9–4.7 in)
- Weight: 1.5–2 kg (3.3–4.4 lb)
- Aging time: 3–4 months, up to 24 months
- Certification: PAT: 2009

Pecorino di Carmasciano, or simply Carmasciano, is an Italian cheese of the pecorino family of cheeses made from sheep milk. It has been recognized since 2009 by the Italian Ministry of Agricultural, Food and Forestry Policies as a prodotto agroalimentare tradizionale (PAT). Pecorino di Carmasciano was featured at Expo 2015 in Milan.

== Place of origin ==
Carmasciano cheese is produced in the area known as Carmasciano, which is constituted by the towns of Guardia Lombardi, Rocca San Felice, and Frigento, in the mountains of Alta Irpinia, in the Italian province of Avellino of the Campania region. The general area known as Carmasciano dates back to the Roman period and was documented by Virgil as the area between Guardia Lombardi and Rocca San Felice. The area is named after a Roman soldier who was given the land by the emperor for his success in war. The cheese may occasionally be made in Sant'Angelo dei Lombardi, Torella dei Lombardi, Villamaina, and Morra De Sanctis.

It is made from the unpasteurized milk of the Laticauda breed of sheep. The name Laticauda literally means "broad-tailed", as the sheep is of the fat-tailed type. The Laticauda sheep are present only in the Campanian Apennines, with their numbers estimated to be around 50,000. For this reason, Carmasciano is produced only in limited quantities on small, family-owned farms and is expensive. A 2015 survey indicated that only five farms currently produce around 2,000 wheels of Carmasciano each year.

== Production ==
The characteristics of the cheese are influenced by the conditions of the sheep. In the Ansanto Valley, the sheep graze on alfalfa and sainfoin herbs near a fumarole (sulfurous fissure). This fissure, known as Mefite, is named after the Samnite goddess Mefitis (hence also the English word mephitic, meaning 'sulfurous'). It is located within Rocca San Felice. The fumarole emits gaseous carbon dioxide and sulfuric acid, which is carried by the wind and influences the formation of the cheese.

The wheels of Carmasciano are usually 15–20 cm (5.9–7.9 in) in diameter and 10–12 cm (3.9–4.7 in) in height, weighing 1.5–2 kg (3.3–4.4 lb). They are produced in cylindrical form. The unpasteurized milk is put into a tinned copper boiler called a caccavo that is placed over a wood-burning fire, where it is heated to 40–45 °C (104–113 °F). It is continually mixed with a ruotolo, a wooden utensil with a rounded tip. The cheese is then coagulated with rennet from lamb or calf and left to rest for 15 minutes. The curds are worked by hand and chopped to the size of a grain of rice and are left to settle on the bottom of the caccavo. The paste is left to rest for 48 hours, then collected and placed in a wicker basket and blanched in hot whey. Once dry, after 5 to 10 days, the cheese is salted, washed with wine, and massaged every other day with olive oil, white wine, and vinegar. Finally, the cheese matures on wooden boards in a cool room, where its rind is sprinkled with chili pepper to keep insects away. It is aged for at least 3 to 4 months, although sometimes it is aged for up to 24 months.

Carmasciano is a hard cheese that has a brown, hard, wrinkled, and unctuous rind. It has a medium to medium-high aroma and can become spicy, although is not typically pungent. It is a natural antioxidant. Carmasciano is eaten as a table cheese and is usually paired with red wine, and the most seasoned wheels are used to season pasta dishes.

== See also ==
- List of Italian cheeses
- List of sheep milk cheeses
