= Mefite =

Mefite may refer to:

- Mefite, alternative name for Mefitis, goddess of foul-smelling gasses from the earth
- A member of MetaFilter, a community weblog
- Mefite of Rocca San Felice, archaeological site in Rocca San Felice
