= Guardia Lombardi =

Guardia Lombardi La Uàrdia (Neapolitan)
- Comune
- Comune di Guardia Lombardi
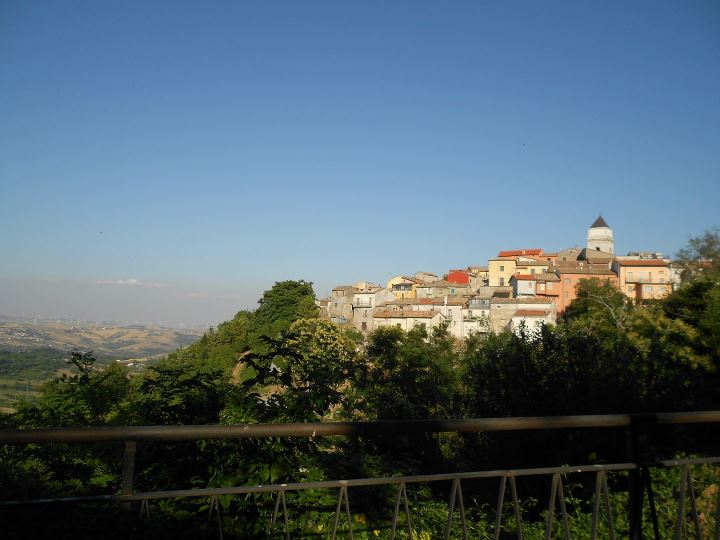
- View of the center of the town

- Coat of arms
- Nicknames: Guardia, La Uàrdia
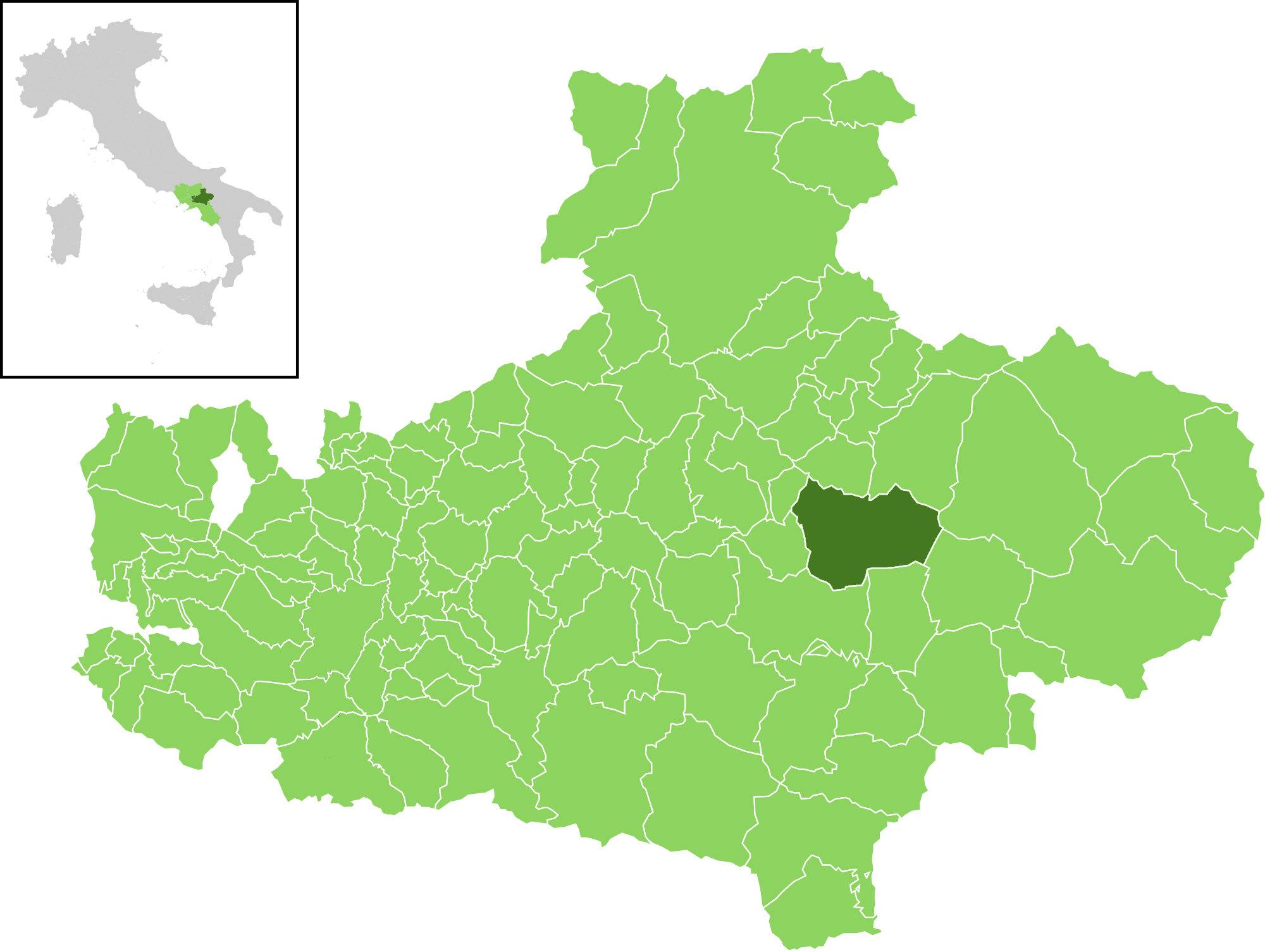
- Location of Guardia Lombardi in the Province of Avellino

- Location within Italy Location within Campania Location within Europe
- Coordinates: 40°57′17″N 15°12′35″E
- Country: Italy
- Region: Campania
- Province: Avellino (AV)
- Founded: Between AD 571 and 591
- Frazioni: Borgo Le Taverne, Guardia Lombardi, Case Siconolfi, Masseria Maiorano, Pietri di Sopra, Rione Forche, Rione Fornace, Rione Montemarano, Santa Maria Manganelli

Government
  - Mayor: Dott. Francescantonio Siconolfi

Area
  - Total: 55.77 km^{2} (21.53 sq mi)
- Elevation: 998 m (3,274 ft)

Population (1 January 2017)
  - Total: 1,698
  - Density: 30.45/km^{2} (78.86/sq mi)
- Demonym: Guardiesi (sing. guardiese)
- Time zone: UTC+1 (CET)
  - Summer (DST): UTC+2 (CEST)
- Postal code: 83040
- Dialing code: 0827
- ISTAT code: 064040
- Patron saint: Pope Leo IX
- Saint day: 19 April
- Website: Official website

Guardia Lombardi (Italian: [ˈɡwardja lomˈbardi]; Irpinian dialect: La Uàrdia [la ˈwardjə]) is a small town and comune (municipality) in the Province of Avellino in Campania, Italy. At an elevation of 998 metres (3,274 ft), it is located in Irpinia in the Apennine Mountains of Southern Italy. It has experienced a number of major earthquakes throughout its history that have devastated the town, and is considered within zone 1 of the Protezione Civile's seismic classification index, indicating very high seismicity.

The town was first settled by the Lombards in the late sixth century as a defensive outpost, giving rise to its name. As of 2017, it is home to 1,698 inhabitants.

== Geography ==
=== Territory ===
Situated 998 metres (3,274 ft) above sea level, ranging from a low of 433 metres (1,421 ft) in the Ufita Valley to a high of 1,024 metres (3,360 ft) in Monte Cerreto, Guardia Lombardi is the second highest municipality in Campania, after Trevico. The territory spans an area of 55.77 km^{2} (21.53 mi^{2}) and, as of 1 January 2017, has a population of 1,698, giving it a population density of 30 inhabitants per square kilometer. The territory is part of the Alta Irpina mountain community. Its neighboring municipalities are Andretta, Bisaccia, Carife, Frigento, Morra De Sanctis, Rocca San Felice, Sant'Angelo dei Lombardi, and Vallata.

It is located 36 kilometres (22 mi) from Avellino, the capital of the province of the same name, and 80 kilometres (50 mi) from Naples, the capital of the region of Campania. The town was one of many impacted by the violent Irpinia earthquake on 23 November 1980.

==== Topography ====
Positioned between the Ufita Valley and the Ofanto Valley, north of Monte Cerreto, in eastern Irpinia, Guardia Lombardi is surrounded by woods and countryside characterized by typical rural buildings.

From the bell tower of the town's mother church and from Monte Cerreto, a few meters from the central Piazza Vittoria, it is possible to see four neighboring regions (Basilicata, Campania, Molise, and Apulia) and ten provinces (Avellino, Benevento, Caserta, Salerno, Campobasso, Isernia, Bari, Barletta-Andria-Trani, Foggia, and Potenza), as well as the Adriatic Sea on clear days.

==== Hydrology ====
The area is rich in natural fountains and springs. One of the most important gives rise to the Frédane stream, a tributary of the Calore Irpino.

=== Earthquakes ===
Throughout its history, Guardia Lombardi has experienced numerous earthquakes. Several of the major earthquakes resulted in almost complete destruction of the town. For this reason, Guardia is classified as within zone 1 of the seismic classification index by the Protezione Civile, indicating very high seismicity.

Among the most significant earthquakes that were particularly devastating for Guardia were the 1694 Irpinia–Basilicata earthquake, which killed 280 Guardiesi, the 1732 Irpinia earthquake, the 1930 Irpinia earthquake, and the 1980 Irpinia earthquake, in which more than 50% of all buildings were destroyed.

=== Climate ===
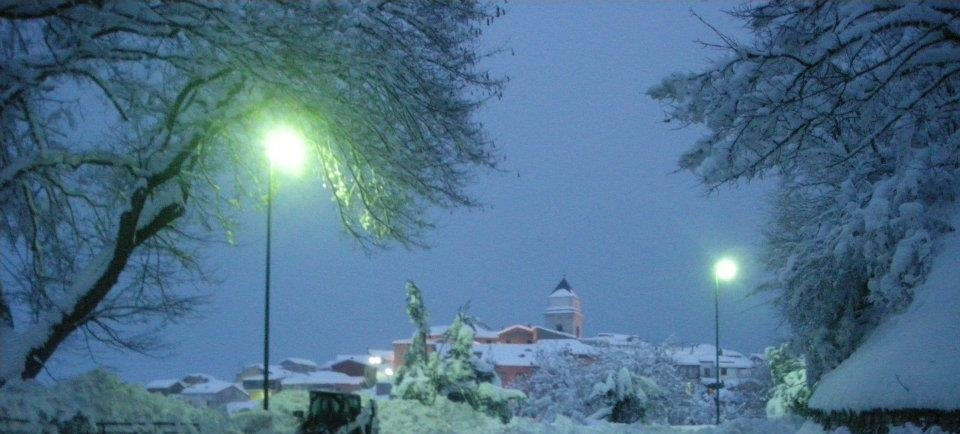
Center of town seen from Villa Comunale during heavy snowfall in 2012

According to the Köppen climate classification, Guardia belongs to the Csa range (warm temperate climate, steppe-type precipitation, hot summer). It is within the temperate zone of the middle latitudes, but its climate is affected by its altitude and topography. In particular, the winter is characterized by frequent rains and heavy snowfall relative to its region. The temperature often drops below freezing (in Celsius) between the months of November and April, with minimum temperatures hitting −10 °C (14 °F). During autumn, fog is quite common. Summer is dry, with maximum temperatures that rarely exceed 30 °C (86 °F).

Data on the weather of Guardia and the Irpinia area is collected at the nearby Trevico Meteorological Station.

Climate data for Guardia Lombardi (1989–2017)
Month	Jan	Feb	Mar	Apr	May	Jun	Jul	Aug	Sep	Oct	Nov	Dec	Year
Record high °C (°F)	19 (66)	19 (66)	23 (73)	25 (77)	32 (90)	35 (95)	37 (99)	38 (100)	35 (95)	29 (84)	24 (75)	20 (68)	38 (100)
Mean daily maximum °C (°F)	13 (55)	14 (57)	16 (61)	18 (64)	23 (73)	27 (81)	30 (86)	31 (88)	26 (79)	22 (72)	18 (64)	15 (59)	21 (70)
Mean daily minimum °C (°F)	8 (46)	8 (46)	10 (50)	12 (54)	15 (59)	19 (66)	22 (72)	22 (72)	19 (66)	16 (61)	13 (55)	10 (50)	15 (58)
Record low °C (°F)	−3 (27)	−1 (30)	0 (32)	2 (36)	9 (48)	12 (54)	15 (59)	16 (61)	12 (54)	9 (48)	2 (36)	0 (32)	−3 (27)
Average rainfall mm (inches)	90 (3.5)	71 (2.8)	71 (2.8)	60 (2.4)	43 (1.7)	36 (1.4)	34 (1.3)	34 (1.3)	102 (4.0)	115 (4.5)	135 (5.3)	112 (4.4)	903 (35.4)
Source: MSN

== Etymology ==
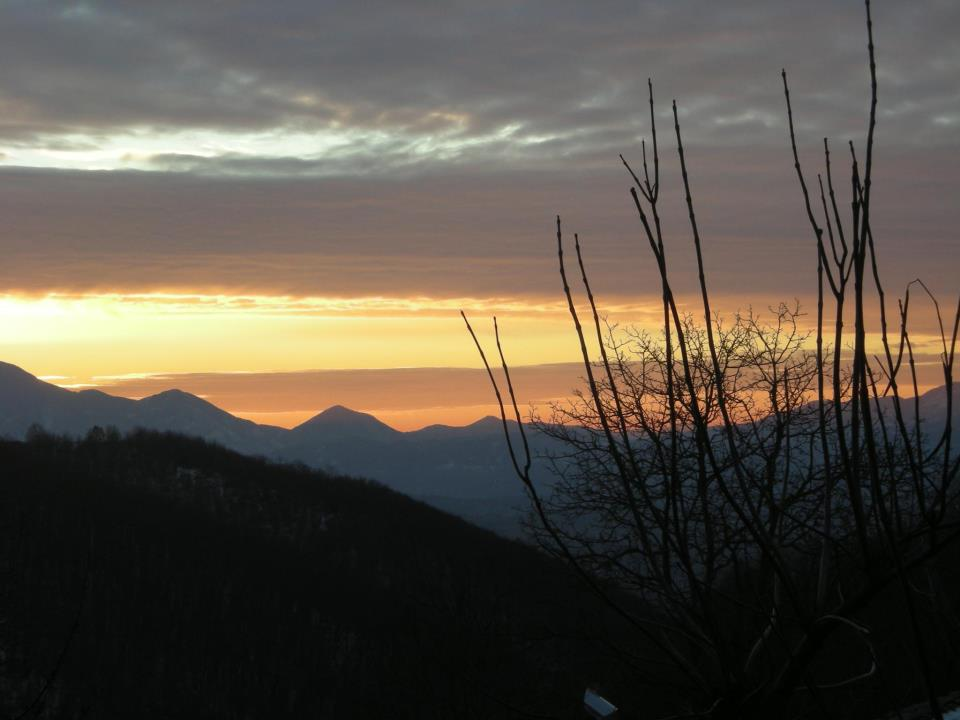
Sunset over the Guardiese landscape

The name of the town is traced back to the term "guarda/garda," which is part of the names of many places in Italy. It alludes to the existence of a guard post; it also can refer to the a place that is elevated compared to the surrounding land. The word derives from the Germanic word "warda," which is of analogous meaning and is perhaps attributable to the Lombards, although it is more likely of Gothic origin.

The Lombards built a castle in the town as a lookout, which gives rise to the name of Guardia Lombardi.

One of the first known names of the town is the Latin name of Guardiae Longobardorum, which later became Guardiae de Lombardis (AD 1100-1300). The name was then changed to Guardialombarda (AD 1400-1600), then Guardia Lombarda (AD 1600-1800), then Guardia dei Lombardi (for the first half of 1900), and finally Guardia Lombardi.

== History ==
=== Guardia and the Romulea hypothesis ===
There is a hypothesis that the founding of Guardia Lombardi occurred much earlier than many documents indicate. Based on studies of the distances traveled in the Tabula Peutingeriana and the Antonine Itinerary on the Via Appia Antica, Guardia could, in fact, be the ancient Samnite city of Romulea, described by Titus Livius in Ab Urbe Condita (book 10, chapter 17). According to Livy's history, Romulea was an opulent city that was conquered and sacked in 293 BC by the Roman consul Publius Decius Mus or, according to another academic source, by Volunnio, and was never rebuilt.

Despite this, the most likely theory is that the ancient city of Romulea coincided with the nearby town of Bisaccia, but the existence in the ancient texts of a mansio called Sub Romula, a small settlement outside Romulea on the edge of the Via Appia, suggests the existence of a population in the Guardiese frazione of Taverne di Guardia. This hypothesis is reflected by the fact that Roman roads were conceived for purely military purposes, favoring paths at high altitudes that allowed control of the surrounding territory to lower valley paths that were subject to floods and landslides and whose travelers were more vulnerable to ambushes.

Recent studies, such as those by E.T. Salmon (based on archeological excavations) and Werner Johannowsky, suggest that Romulea was located in present-day Carife. In that case, it is possible that the mansio Sub Romula would have been located in the Guardiese frazione of Piano d'Occhio, which is close to the river Ufita and geographically closer to Carife, where the ruins of a large Roman villa are located.

=== First settlements (571–591) ===
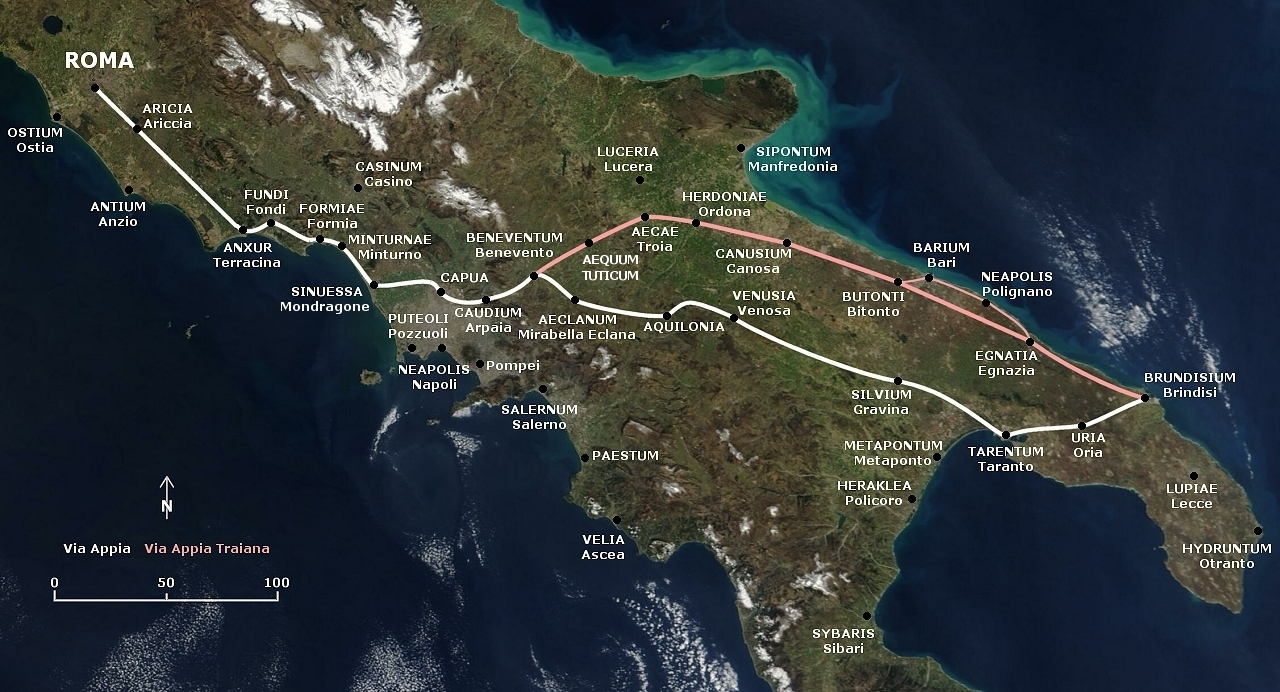
Route of the Via Appia and the Via Traiana.

Although the topography of Guardia Lombardi suggests that the Samnites had thought of settling it, especially during the Samnite Wars against the Roman Republic from 343 to 290 BC, there are no physical remnants of a settlement from that time, nor are there remnants from the later era of the Roman Empire. After the fall of the Western Roman Empire in AD 476, the period of time between Ancient Times and the Middle Ages, known as Late Antiquity, all of Italy was devastated by Germanic tribes from Northern Europe that ravaged the area of Irpinia during the Barbarian Invasions.

The Lombards settled the area between Benevento and Taranto on the Ionian Sea; the Duchy of Benevento was established and the eponymous city became the capital of Southern Italy. It was during this period, between the arrival of the Lombards led by the Zotto in 571, and 591 in which the town of Guardia was settled. The area was selected for its geographic features, which could be used as a defensive outpost.

=== Lombard rule (591–1076) ===
The Lombards formed strongholds that proved vital to repelling the Arab threats. Guardia became a center of importance due to its strategic position, as the town both borders Saracen land and is on the Via Appia Antica that connects Rome with Brindisi. In 591, the Lombards, having completed their conquest of Irpinia, created the Gastaldate of Conza, their administrative division. Part of Langobardia Minor, the gastaldate included Guardia and was designed to protect Benevento by repelling any armies approaching from the East. For this reason, the Lombards built a defensive castle in Guardia, which was an elevated position. It is believed that this castle was incorporated into a palazzo built in the seventeenth century, which is now owned by the Forgione and Santoli families.

Guardia remained under Lombard control until the arrival of the Normans in 1076.

=== Norman rule (1076–1197) ===
The Normans, led by Robert Guiscard, conquered the entire Gastaldate of Conza between 1076 and 1079 as part of the larger conquest of Southern Italy. The last gastald of Conza, Guido, the uncle of Gisulf II, unsuccessfully opposed the invasion. Under the Normans, Guardia became a fiefdom governed by a feudal lord. Under the lords, the peasants were bound to the fiefdom and were sold along with the land as serfs. There were two types of agrarian pacts between the feudal lords and peasants:

1. Emphyteutic contracts, in which the peasant received a piece of land to be cultivated in perpetuity or for a long time and in return had to pay an annual fee.
2. Pastinato contracts, in which the peasant was granted an unproductive piece to cultivate of land for a longer period of time. At the end of the contract, only if the land was productive, the yield would be divided between the lord and the peasant farmer, the latter of which had the alternative option of continuing to reside on the productive land. This was intended as a way of introducing new crops to an area.

Pastinato was practiced in Guardia. This meant that the castle of Guardia became the population center around which houses were built, permitting the spread of small, peasant properties.

The Normans generally did not alter the pre-existing Lombard districts and allowed the feudal lords who pledged their allegiance to keep possession of their fiefdoms. However, in many cases, they destroyed the castles and confiscated the lands of those who opposed their rule. This was the case in Guardia.

In 1133, the town was destroyed by Roger II of Sicily. Once rebuilt, it became the fiefdom of the Balvano family, after which the town of Balvano is named.

=== Late Middle Ages ===
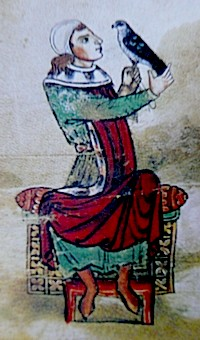
Manfred, depicted with a falcon, who fought in the Battle of Guardia Lombardi.

In 1250, the year of his death, Frederick II of Hohenstaufen resided in the castle of Bisaccia, which he used for falconry trips on Monte Formicoso, on the border of Guardia, which he renamed Montesano. He was succeeded by his son, Manfred, who, on 30 October 1254, defeated here a papal army in the Battle of Guardia Lombardi, theretofore owned by the Marquis Bertoldo of Hohenburg.

The Angevins, who succeeded the Hohenstaufen, assigned the fiefdom of Guardia to the family member and advisor Milone di Galata. When the Aragonese seized the Kingdom of Naples in the 15th century, the Guardiese fiefdom passed to the House of Orsini del Balzo.

=== Modern and contemporary ages ===
In 1503, Guardia came under Spanish rule. In this period, it moved from rule under the Folliero family to the House of Della Marra, when in 1611, the system of rule transitioned from feudal lords to dukes. The head of the house, Ferrante Della Marra, a notably cultured man, took over in 1607 as Duke of Guardia.

With the end of Austrian domination, Guardia became part of the Ultra Principality of the Kingdom of Naples. The dukes were from the Ruffo di Calabria family, whose head, Guglielmo Antonio Ruffo I, had married Silvia Della Marra.

In 1861, Guardia was annexed by the Kingdom of Italy and adjoined to the third district of Montefusco. The title and ownership of the castle remained with the Ruffo di Calabria family and the 8th, current, Duke of Guardia Lombardi is Fulco Ruffo II di Calabria, nephew of the aviator and politician Fulco Ruffo di Calabria.

In the twentieth century, Guardia was severely damaged by earthquakes, particularly the Irpinia earthquake of 1930 and the earthquake of 1980, in which the town was almost completely ruined.

In the first half of the twentieth century, there was heavy emigration to the United States due to poor economic conditions. Lombard Street in Baltimore, Maryland was named after the town, as the area was once predominantly inhabited by Italian immigrants. Additionally, Scranton, Pennsylvania and Guardia Lombardi declared each other sister cities in 2014 due to the number of Guardiese immigrants residing in Scranton. Likewise, many Guardiese immigrated to the New York metropolitan area, especially Westchester County. An organization called the Association of Former Citizens of Guardia Lombardi was established as a benefit society for Italian American immigrants from Guardia and their descendants, with its headquarters in Mount Vernon, New York, where a street was named Guardia Lombardi Plaza.

== Demographics ==
Census population
Year	Pop.	±%
1861	3,504	—
1871	3,630	+3.6%
1881	4,084	+12.5%
1901	5,062	+23.9%
1911	4,804	−5.1%
1921	5,508	+14.7%
1931	4,961	−9.9%
1936	5,336	+7.6%
1951	5,523	+3.5%
1961	4,732	−14.3%
1971	3,439	−27.3%
1981	3,014	−12.4%
1991	2,361	−21.7%
2001	2,029	−14.1%
2011	1,803	−11.1%
2021	1,526	−15.4%
Source: ISTAT

Historical population
Year	Families
1532	151
1545	190
1561	232
1595	349
1648	310
1669	174

The population as of 1 January 2023 is estimated to be 1,518 inhabitants. With a geographical area of 55.77 square kilometres (21.53 mi^{2}), the population density is 27 people per square kilometer, or around 70 people per square mile. As of 2023, there were 693 families in Guardia and the average number of members of a family was 2.19, compared to 2003, in which there were 785 families and the average number of family members was 2.53.

As of 1 January 2023, there are 68 foreign citizens residing in Guardia, constituting 4.5% of the population. Nationals of ten different countries reside in Guardia, with 92.65% of foreign nationals originating from elsewhere in Europe. The country of origin of the largest number of people is Bulgaria, whose 34 citizens account for half of all foreign citizens, followed by Ukraine and Romania.

In 2023, there were 181 residents aged 18 years or fewer, 93 of whom are 10 years of age or younger. In the same year, there were 736 males living in the town, comprising 48.5% of the population, and 782 females, comprising 51.5% of the population.

Guardia has been in constant population decline since the post-World War II period. The decade with the greatest population decrease was that of 1961 to 1971, during which the population shrunk by more than one quarter. Since 2002, the rate of population decline in Guardia has been markedly higher than the rate of decline of the Province of Avellino and the region of Campania. In each year between 2002 and 2022, the mortality rate was higher than the birth rate; in 2022, this resulted in 26 fewer births than deaths with 34 deaths and 8 births.

== Culture ==
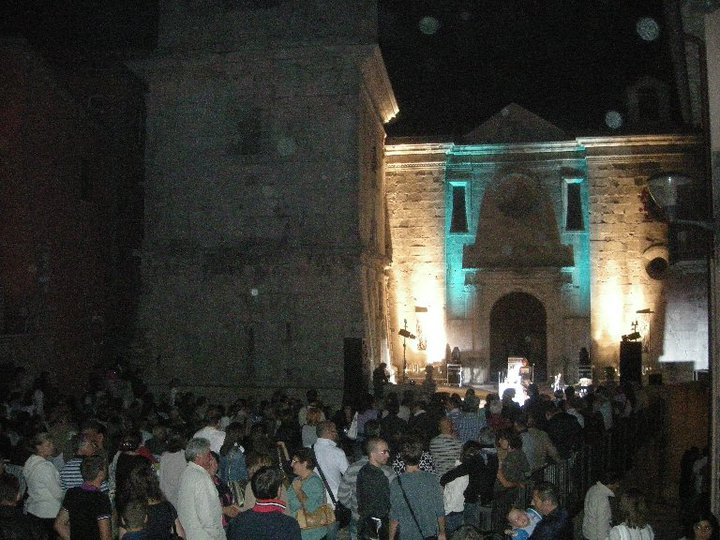
Church of Santa Maria Delle Grazie during a summer event

Guardia Lombardi is home to a municipal library (Italian: Biblioteca Comunale Associata UNLA), which was founded in 1982 by Guardiese historian Salvatore Boniello. It hosts cultural events, such as Le strade della poesia (English: The streets of poetry) and Paese Mio.

=== Traditions ===
On the feast day of Saint Joseph, 19 March, it is a tradition in Guardia to light bonfires. The patron saint of Guardia Lombardi is Pope Leo IX, whose feast day is celebrated on 19 April.

In August, there is a historical re-enactment of the arrival of Prince Manfred of Swabia in Guardia Lombardi.

=== Products ===
Guardia is known for producing certain food products. One of these is Pecorino di Carmasciano. This cheese is made from the milk of the Laticauda breed of sheep, which graze on alfalfa and sainfoin in the mountains of Guardia and Rocca San Felice. Carmasciano is traditionally made by hand and aged for up to 24 months. It has a strong, sapid taste. Due to endangerment of Laticauda sheep, Carmasciano is produced in small quantities by small, family-run farms and is expensive. A 2015 survey indicated that there were only five farms producing Carmasciano, with 2000 wheels of cheese produced annually. Pecorino di Carmasciano was presented at Expo 2015 in Milan.

The beekeeping company Beveri is located in Guardia and produces local honey and syrups.

== Main sights ==
=== Churches ===
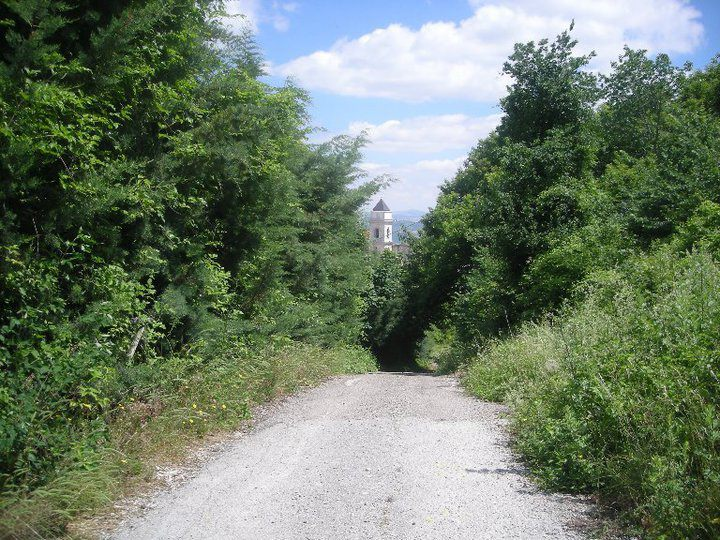
Bell tower of the mother church as seen from Monte Cerreto.

The mother church of Guardia Lombardi is the Church of Santa Maria delle Grazie (Italian: Chiesa S. Maria delle Grazie), which was established in the year 1315. Its first architectural design was cruciform, specifically in the shape of a Greek cross. This building was destroyed by an earthquake on 5 December 1456 and was rebuilt upon the initiative of the feudal lord of Guardia, Maria Donata Del Balzo. In 1665, a bell tower was added to the edifice. With the Irpinia earthquake of 1980, the church was once again destroyed. It was later rebuilt and restored. It was reopened in 1999 as it now stands today, within the territorial jurisdiction of the Archdiocese of Sant'Angelo dei Lombardi-Conza-Nusco-Bisaccia.

While there were once several churches in the center of town, the only other church that remains there besides the Church of Santa Maria delle Grazie is the Church of the Miracle (Italian: Chiesa del Miracolo). It was built around the year 1600 at the behest of Beatrice Della Marra, Duchess of Guardia Lombardi, along with a monastery of Augustinian priests but was seriously damaged by an earthquake on 8 September 1694, which also killed around 300 Guardiesi. It was rebuilt in 1754 and took the name Church of Purgatory (Italian: Chiesa del Purgatorio), being dedicated to the Blessed Virgin Mary and the souls in purgatory. It was later named the Church of San Vito, in honor of a statue of St. Vitus inside the church. By decree of the government on 17 July 1890, the church then became known as the Congregation of Charity (Italian: Congrega della Carità). The church building had deteriorated over the years and was restored in 1980 with funds contributed by locals and Guardiesi in the United States.

=== Fountains ===
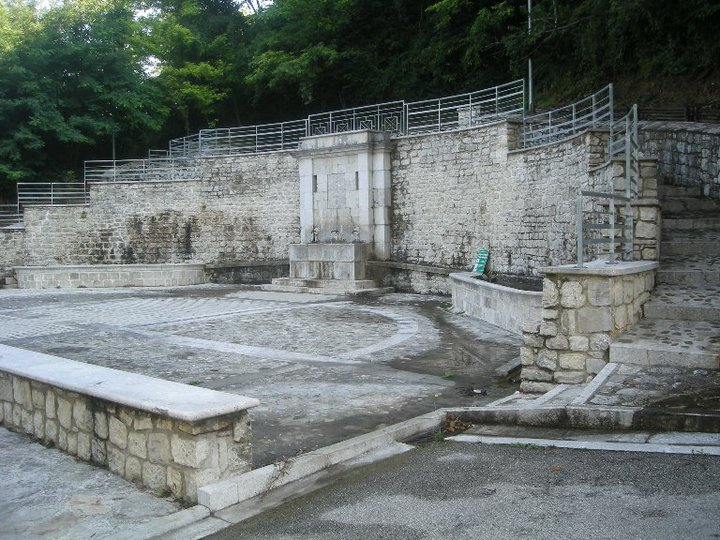
Fontana Beveri

There are numerous public fountains in the area. One of the most significant is Fontana Beveri, which is located at the southwestern foot of the mountain Mundi. It is constructed out of large slabs of white, hard-carved stone.

Another fountain is Fontana Manganelli, which includes an amphitheater and picnic area. Other fountains are Fontana di Tolla, San Leone, Matrone, Righiera, San Leonardo, Frassino, Volacchio, Della Calce, Lavagnili, Pietri di Sotto, Dell'Agata, Fontanili, and Tonsone.

The Fontana Tonsone is the source of the Frédane stream, a tributary of the Calore Irpino.

=== Museum ===
The Museum of Technology, Farming, and Culture of Rural Life in Alta Irpinia (Italian: Museo delle Tecnologie, della Cultura e della Civiltà Contadina dell'Alta Irpinia) is located in Guardia Lombardi. It was founded in 1981 by Guardiese historian Salvatore Boniello, and contains around one thousand objects and tools of the farming culture of Alta Irpinia from the Middle Ages to the 20th century, in addition to common tools, such as a plow and the first typewriter purchased by the municipality.

The museum houses reconstructions of the rural and municipal environments, which depict the different lifestyles. Within its collection is also a photographic exhibit on typical dress, a collection of noble coats of arms, and exhibits on embroidery, weaving, blacksmithing, carpentry, and medicine.

== Transportation ==
The most important road to Guardia Lombardi is the SS 303 state road, which connects Mirabella Eclano to Apulia and Basilicata. SS 425 state road can be used to reach Lioni and SS 7, the Appian Way modern state road, known locally as Ofantina Bis, from Guardia. The SP 281 provincial road connects Guardia to the Grottaminarda exit, from which one can reach Naples and the A1 motorway.

== People ==
- Gerardo Bianco (born 1931), Italian politician
- Lucio Bianco (born 1941), engineer
- Salvatore Boniello (1928–2010), historian and dialectologist
- Giovannantonio Cipriani (1824–1906), proponent of Italian unification

== See also ==
- Rocca San Felice
- Irpinia
- 1980 Irpinia earthquake
- 1930 Irpinia earthquake
- Pecorino di Carmasciano
