= Salvatore Boniello =

Italian historian and writer

- Born: 18 February 1928; Guardia Lombardi, Campania, Italy
- Died: 25 October 2010 (aged 82); Guardia Lombardi, Campania, Italy
- Occupations: Historian, dialectologist, teacher

Salvatore Boniello (18 February 1928 – 25 October 2010) was an Italian historian and writer. A primary school teacher from the early post-World War II years, he conducted historical, dialectological, and ethnographic research on Irpinia. The author of numerous publications, he founded the Museum of Technology, Farming, and Culture of Rural Life in Alta Irpinia in Guardia Lombardi.

He was also a journalist and correspondent to several newspapers, national (Il Tempo and Il Mattino) and local (Altirpinia, Corriere dell'Irpinia, and Ottopagine).

== Biography ==
Salvatore Boniello was born on 18 February 1928 in Guardia Lombardi in Campania, Italy.

=== Teaching career and involvement in UNLA ===
Boniello began his career in elementary education at the age of 18 in 1946, in the context of low literacy in the mountainous areas of Alta Irpinia. His love of teaching led him to travel from one village to another by foot, often in harsh weather.

Ten years later, in 1956, he established a Cultural Center for Lifelong Learning (CCEP) of the National Union for the Fight Against Illiteracy (UNLA) in Guardia Lombardi. The following year, he established courses for illiterate people in Basilicata. In 1958, he became the head of the CCEP in Guardia Lombardi, which he was until 1962, when he was elected a UNLA regional delegate for Campania.

In 1968, he established and directed the Cultural Services Center of Avellino and established the Cultural Services Center in Potenza, Mercato San Severino, Secondigliano. In 1969, with the office of the UNLA national inspector, he visited all the CCEP in and Cultural Service Centers in Sicily, Calabria, Campania, Sardinia, Puglia, and Basilicata.

In 1972, he set up the "Lazzare" tree nursery in Guardia Lombardi.

In 1976, he organized at the CCEP 50 courses for immigrants on the English, Spanish, French, and German languages. In 1980, the year of the violent 1980 Irpinia earthquake, he was elected Deputy Mayor of Guardia Lombardi. During that time, he created the Museum of Technology, Farming, and Culture of Rural Life in Alta Irpinia (in 1981). Moreover, in 1982, he established a permanent photographic exhibit on the historical center of town and a UNLA Associated Municipal Library (Italian: Biblioteca Comunale Associata UNLA).

After almost 50 years, he retired from teaching in 1993.

=== Career as a writer, historian, and dialectologist ===
In the last twenty years of his life, Boniello used his extensive historical and ethnographic research to publish several books. In 1994, he published the Dizionario dialettale della lingua di Guardia dei Lombardi (transl. Dialectal dictionary of the language of Guardia dei Lombardi) and in 1995, he released Viaggio in memoria (transl. Journey in memory), probably his most popular book, which was re-published in 2002. In 1999, he published Milleuno Detti e Proverbi dialettali di Guardia dei Lombardi e dell'Alta Irpinia (transl. A thousand and one sayings and dialectal proverbs of Guardia dei Lombardi and Alta Irpinia).

Two years later, he published Sulle orme del passato (transl. In the footsteps of the past), which had two editions. In 2001, he supervised publication of the book Antica funzione storica, sociale e legale dei soprannomi dialettali di Guardia dei Lombardi (transl. Ancient historical, social and legal function of the dialectal nicknames of Guardia dei Lombardi), written by UNLA collaborator Stefania Giordano.

=== Final years ===
In 2008, Boniello was elected National Vice President of UNLA. The following year, he worked on the book L'antica via Appia in Alta Irpinia tra la valle dell'Ufita e la misteriosa Valle d'Ansanto (transl. The Ancient Via Appia in Alta Irpinia between the Ufita Valley and the mysterious Ansanto Valley, which was never published.

Before his death in autumn of 2010, he was working on two new publications: one concerning emigration, which was a meticulous collection and interpretation of the letters of Irpinia emigrants to the Americas from 1900 to today, and one concerning Carmine Crocco and the phenomenon of Brigandage in Southern Italy.

Boniello died on 25 October 2010 in Guardia Lombardi.

=== Legacy ===
On 27 December 2010, just over two months after his death, the Salvatore Boniello Conference took place in Guardia Lombardi. Among others, such speakers as Gerardo Bianco (a fellow Guardiese), Gianfranco Rotondi, and Vitaliano Gemelli (president of UNLA) participated in the conference. There, linguist Edgar Radtke announced in a press release his intention to organize a day of study dedicated to Boniello and to pursue his interrupted research.
