= Mephitis =

Mephitis may refer to:

- Mephitis (genus), a genus of skunks
- Mefitis or Mephitis, a Roman goddess
