= Bianco (disambiguation) =

Bianco is a town and comune in the Province of Reggio Calabria, in southern Italy.

Bianco may also refer to:

== People ==
- Bianco (surname)

=== Given name ===
- Bianco (harpist) (1927–2007), American harpist
- Bianco Bianchi (1917–1997), Italian cyclist
- Bianco Spartaco Gambini (1893–1966), Brazilian footballer
- Bianco Luno (1795–1852), Danish entrepreneur
- Bianco da Siena (1350–1399), Italian mystic poet and an imitator of Jacopone da Todi

== Other uses ==
- BIANCO, an independent anti-corruption office in Madagascar
- Mont Blanc (Italian: Monte Bianco)
- Pizzeria Bianco, a pizza restaurant in downtown Phoenix, Arizona
