= Bianco (surname) =

Bianco or Lo Bianco
- Pronunciation: /biˈæŋkoʊ/

Origin
- Meaning: white
- Region of origin: Italy

Bianco is an Italian surname meaning "white". Notable people with the surname include:

- Adriana Bianco (born 1941), known professionally as Adrianita, Argentine actress
- Alessandro Bianco (born 2002), Italian footballer
- Andrea Bianco, Italian sailor and cartographer of the 15th century
- Bartolommeo Bianco (1604–1656), Italian architect and painter
- Caroline Blanco (pastor) (1949–2010), French pastor
- Chris Bianco (born 1960), American celebrity chef
- Enzo Bianco (born 1951), Italian politician
- Esmé Bianco (born 1982), British actress, model, and performer
- Eugene "Bianco" Bianco (1927–2007), American harpist
- Gino Bianco (1916–1984), Italian racing driver
- Lory Bianco (born 1963), American singer
- Lucio Bianco (born 1941), Italian engineer
- Lucien Bianco (born 1930), French historian
- Margery Williams Bianco (1881–1944), English-American author
- Mike Bianco (born 1967), American baseball coach
- Nicholas Bianco (1932–1994), New York mobster
- Paola Bianco (born 1975), Uruguayan television presenter and actress
- Raffaele Bianco (born 1987), Italian footballer
- Umberto Zanotti Bianco (1889–1963), Italian archaeologist and politician

== See also ==
- Eleonora Lo Bianco (born 1979), Italian volleyball player
- Tony Lo Bianco (born 1936), American actor
