= Ampsanctus =

Lake in Italy

Ampsanctus, or Amsanctus (modern: Sorgente Mefita) was a small lake in the territory of the Hirpini, c. 15 kilometres (9 mi) south of Aeclanum, close to the Via Appia (southern Italy). There are now two small pools which exhale carbonic acid gas and hydrogen sulfide. Close by was a temple of the goddess Mephitis, with a cave from which suffocating vapors rose, and for this reason, the place was brought into connection with the legends of the infernal regions. Virgil's description (Aeneid, vii. 563) is not, however, very accurate.
