= Giovannantonio Cipriani =

Italian politician

- Born: 13 November 1824; Guardia Lombardi, Campania, Kingdom of the Two Sicilies
- Died: 30 July 1906 (aged 81); Guardia Lombardi, Campania, Kingdom of Italy
- Movement: Italian unification
- Parents: Salvadore Cipriano (father); Nicoletta Siconolfi (mother)

Giovannantonio Cipriani (13 November 1824 – 30 July 1906) was an Italian political activist and a proponent of Italian unification.

Known in nineteenth century documents contemporaneous with his lifetime as "Cipriano," from the age of 20, he was a notary and was affiliated with the Young Italy political organization.

As part of the Kingdom of Italy's attempt at unification of Southern Italy with the rest of the kingdom, Cipriani fought against Southern Italian brigandage and defeated the band led by Carmine Crocco, who violently opposed unification.

Cipriani was a friend of Francesco de Sanctis, who supported Cipriani in his electoral campaigns, as evidenced by the exchange of letters in de Sanctis' book Un viaggio elettorale.

== See also ==
- Brigandage
- Brigandage in southern Italy after 1861
- Italian unification
