= Caroline Blanco (pastor) =

French pastor

- Born: 3 May 1949; Križevci
- Died: 2 December 2010 (aged 61)
- Occupation: pastor
- Known for: advocacy for same sex marriage in France

Caroline Blanco (3 May 1949 – 2 December 2010) was a French pastor, born in Spain and died in Eaubonne. She succeeded Joseph Doucé at the Center of Christ the Liberator, where she is known for being one of the first pastors in France to bless gay and lesbian couples.

== Biography ==
Caroline Blanco was born on 3 May 1949 in Spain. She lived with her partner, Catherine, from the late 1980s, with whom she has a daughter, Sarah.

She studied at the Protestant Institute (IPT) in Paris, where she met pastor Joseph Doucé through professor André Dumas. In 1979, she joined the Center of Christ the Liberator (CCL) founded three years earlier by Doucé. There, she performed several hundred religious blessings for gay and lesbian couples, both before and after the creation of PACS (the first recognition of civil unions in 1999 in France). She is considered one of France's leader's of inclusion.

She took over from Doucé following his assassination in 1990. She affiliated the CCL to the progressive fellowship of the Metropolitan Community Church.

Blanco died of respiratory arrest on 2 December 2010 at the hospital in Eaubonne (Val-d'Oise), age 61. She was cremated on 7 December at the Crematorium of Saint-Ouen-l'Aumône by pastor David Stewart. The CCL drew to a halt after her death.
