= Laticauda sheep =

Italian breed of sheep

Laticauda
- Conservation status: FAO (2007); not at risk
- Country of origin: southern Italy
- Distribution: Campania, Calabria
- Use: dual-purpose, meat and milk

Traits
- Weight: Male: 95 kg; Female: 69 kg
- Height: Male: 82 cm; Female: 71 cm
- Wool colour: white
- Face colour: white

The Laticauda or Barbaresca della Campania is an Italian breed of domestic sheep from Campania and Calabria, in southern Italy. It is a fat-tailed breed, which gives rise to the name Laticauda, "broad-tailed". It is raised mainly in its area of origin in the provinces of Avellino, Benevento and Caserta, but is also found in the provinces of Cosenza, Matera and Naples. Like the Barbaresca breed of Sicily, it appears to result from the hybridisation of local breeds with Barbary (or Barbarin) sheep of Maghrebi origin. It has been suggested that these were first brought to the area by the Bourbon king Charles VII of Naples.

The Laticauda is one of the seventeen autochthonous Italian sheep breeds for which a genealogical herd-book is kept by the Associazione Nazionale della Pastorizia, the Italian national association of sheep-breeders. Total numbers for the breed were estimated at 60000 in 1983; in 2013 the number recorded in the herdbook was 2802. In 2014 the region of Campania estimated the total number at 7000 head.

In 2014 the Barbaresca della Campania was reported to DAD-IS separately from the Laticauda.

== Use ==
Lambs are usually slaughtered at the age of about a month, at a weight of 10–15 kg. Milk yield is about 120–140 litres per lactation. The milk has 7–13% fat and 5.5–8.5% protein; it is the only milk used in the production of Pecorino di Laticauda Sannita, a pecorino cheese for which DOP status has been requested. It is also used to make the Pecorino di Carmasciano.
