= Gerardo Bianco =

Italian politician (1931–2022)

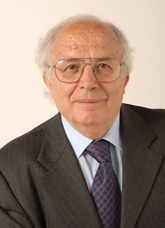

Minister of Education
- In office 27 July 1990 – 13 April 1991
- Prime Minister: Giulio Andreotti
- Preceded by: Sergio Mattarella
- Succeeded by: Riccardo Misasi

President of the Italian People's Party
- In office 12 January 1997 – 2 October 1999
- Preceded by: Giovanni Bianchi
- Succeeded by: Office abolished

Secretary of the Italian People's Party
- In office 1 July 1995 – 12 January 1997
- Preceded by: Rocco Buttiglione
- Succeeded by: Franco Marini

Member of the Chamber of Deputies
- In office 30 May 2001 – 28 April 2008
- Constituency: Campania
- In office 5 June 1968 – 14 April 1994
- Constituency: Benevento–Avellino–Salerno

Personal details
- Born: 12 September 1931 Guardia Lombardi, Italy
- Died: 1 December 2022 (aged 91) Rome, Italy
- Party: DC (until 1994); PPI (1994–2002); Independent (2002–2004); IP (2004–2008); The Rose for Italy (2008)
- Height: 1.69 m (5 ft 7 in)
- Relatives: Lucio Bianco (brother)
- Profession: Politician, university professor

Gerardo Bianco (12 September 1931 – 1 December 2022) was an Italian politician.

== Early life ==
Bianco was born in Guardia Lombardi, Campania in Italy. Winner of a scholarship at the Augustinianum College of Catholic University of the Sacred Heart, he graduated in classical letters.

== Career ==
Bianco has been Deputy from 1968 to 1994 and from 2001 to 2008, chairman of Christian Democracy (Democrazia Cristiana; DC) in the Chamber from 1979 to 1983 and from 1992 to 1994, Vice-President of Chamber of Deputies from 1987 to 1990 and MEP from 1994 to 1999. He also served as Minister of Education in the Andreotti VI Cabinet.

In 1995 he opposed the Secretary of the Italian People's Party (PPI), Rocco Buttiglione, for his approach to the centre-right during the regional elections that year. Bianco was subsequently elected Secretary of the PPI while Buttiglione founded a new party, the United Christian Democrats (CDU). He remained Secretary until 1997, the year he became president of PPI. He also was the director of the newspaper Il Popolo in 1995 and from 1999 to 2000.

In 2002 Bianco opposed the dissolution of the PPI into The Daisy (DL), and so joined the new party as an independent. In 2004 he founded the movement Popular Italy(IP), with the purpose of restoring an autonomous organized presence for democratic Catholics in Italy. In 2008 he refused to join the Democratic Party (PD) and instead entered the mixed (Misto) group.

== Personal life and death ==
Bianco died in Rome on 1 December 2022, at the age of 91.
