= Elena Isayev =

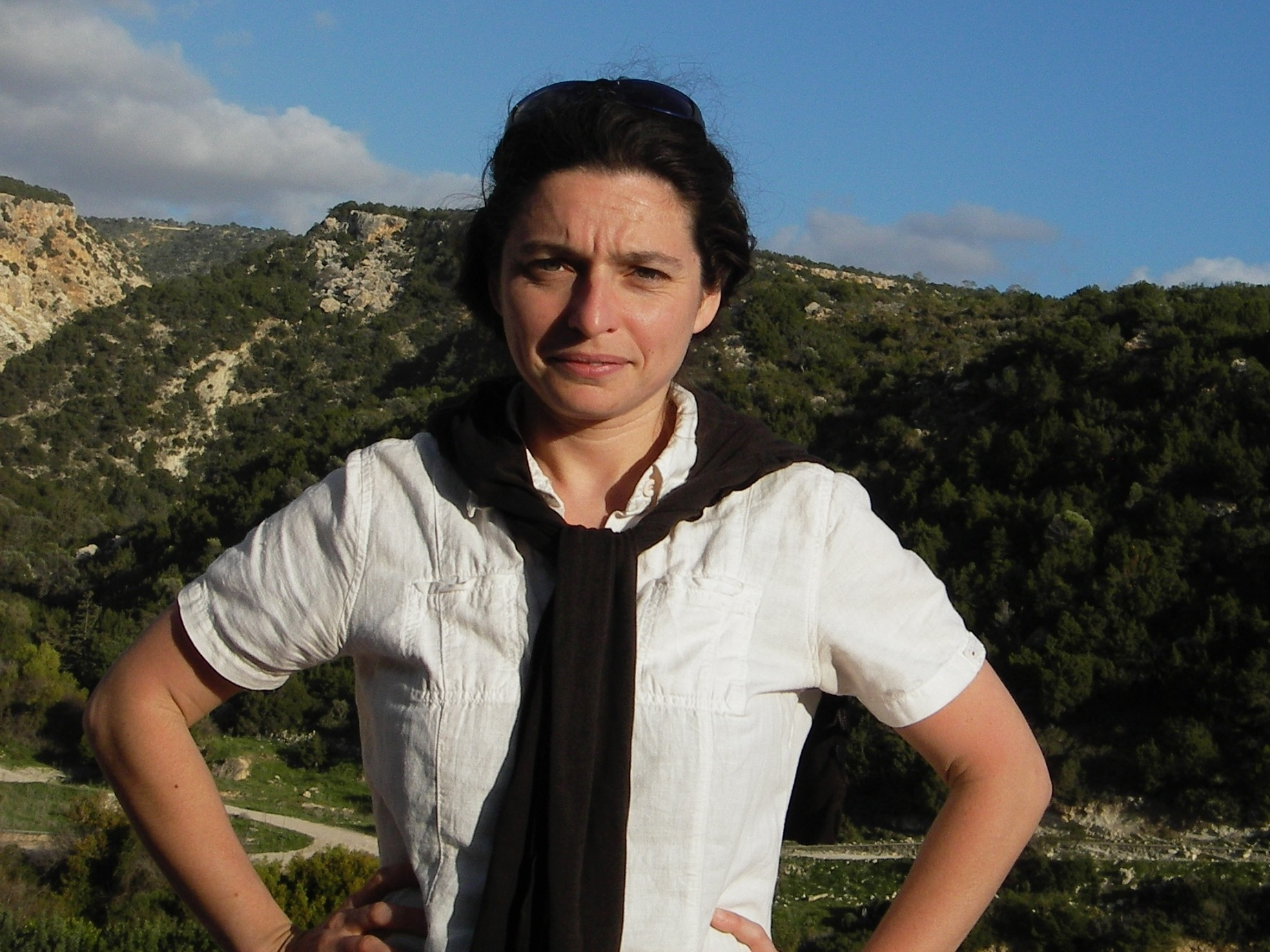

Academic background
- Education: York University

Academic work
- Discipline: Ancient history and classics
- Institutions: University of Exeter

Elena Isayev is professor of ancient history and place in the Classics and Ancient History Department at the University of Exeter. She is an expert on migration, hospitality and displacement, particularly in ancient Mediterranean contexts. She works with Campus in Camps in Palestine and she is a trustee of the charity Refugee Support Devon.

After completed a PhD at University College London (UCL) in 2000, Isayev taught at UCL and the University Birmingham before joining Exeter in 2002.

== Education ==
Isayev graduated magna cum laude from York University in Canada in 1993 with a Bachelor of Arts in history and classical studies. She then went on to complete a master's degree in classical archaeology at the University of British Columbia in 1995.

Isayev received her PhD in 2000 from University College London for a thesis entitled Indigenous communities in Lucania: Social Organization and Political Forms, Fourth to First Century BC.

== Career and research ==
Isayev integrates her research about ancient communities in relation to place and migration and applies it to modern contexts. She has worked with artists from Israel, Palestine, and Iraq to examine memory and place, particularly in refugee camps. Her work has been described as highly important and innovative. In 2018 she guest edited 'Displacement and the Humanities: Manifestos from the Ancient to the Present', a Special Issue of Humanities, a peer reviewed, international, open access journal.

Isayev lectured at the University of Birmingham in 2000-01 and University College London in 2000-02 before joining the University of Exeter as a senior lecturer in 2002. She was promoted to associate professor in 2015 and professor in 2017. Her inaugural lecture, entitled "The Sky is Hidden: on the Opening of Language and Borders", was delivered on 7 March 2019. She co-coordinates the 'Routes: Migration, Mobility, Displacement' Centre at the University of Exeter. She is treasurer for the Council of University Classical Departments.

Isayev is currently a senior visiting research fellow at the Institute of Advanced Studies, University of London. Her project is 'Beyond Resilience: Innovation from Displacement'. She was a Migration and Mobility Fellow at the Centre for Advanced Studies, University of Tübingen in July 2018. In 2017 she held a Humanities Research Centre Fellowship at the Australian National University.

In 2009-10 she held a Davis Fellowship at the Davis Center for Historical Studies, Princeton University. Her project was Paradoxes of Place: Pausing Motion in Ancient Italy and Now.

== Bibliography ==
- 'Making Ancient Mobility Visible', Migration and Migrant Identities in the Near East from Antiquity to the Middle Ages, edited by Justin Yoo, Andrea Zerbini, Caroline Barron. Abingdon: Routledge, 2019
- Migration, Mobility and Place in Ancient Italy. Cambridge: Cambridge University Press, 2017
- 'Between Hospitality and Asylum: A Historical Perspective on Displaced Agency', International Review of the Red Cross, vol. 99 (904) pp. 75–98
- 'Citizens among outsiders in Plautus's Roman Cosmopolis: a Moment of Change', Citizens in the Graeco-Roman World: Aspects of Citizenship from the Archaic Period to AD 212, edited by Lucia Cecchet and Anna Busetto. Leiden: Brill, 2017
- 'Italy before the Romans', Blackwell Companion to Roman Italy, edited by Alison Cooley. Oxford: Oxford University Press, 2016, pp. 1–32.
- 'Polybius's Global Moment and Human Mobility throughout Ancient Italy', Globalisation and the Roman World: World History, Connectivity and Material Culture, edited by Martin Pitts and Miguel John Versluys. New York: Cambridge University Press, 2015
- 'Polybius's Global Moment and Human Mobility through Ancient Italy', Globalisation and the Roman World: World History, Connectivity and Material Culture. Cambridge: Cambridge University Press, 2014
- 'Italian perspectives from Hirpinia in the period of Gracchan Land Reforms and the Social War', Creating Ethnicities and Identities in the Roman World, edited by Andrew Gardner, Edward Herring and Kathryn Lomas. London: Institute of Classical Studies, School of Advanced Study, University of London, 2013
- Inside Ancient Lucania: Dialogues in History and Archaeology. London: Institute of Classical Studies, School of Advanced Study, University of London, 2007
- Ancient Italy: Regions Without Boundaries, edited by Guy Bradley, Elena Isayev and Corinna Riva. Exeter: University of Exeter Press, 2007
- 'Unruly Youth? The Myth of Generation Conflict in Late Republican Rome', Historia: Zeitschrift für Alte Geschichte, 2007, vol. 56 (1), pp. 1–13
