= Lucio Bianco =

Italian engineer

- Born: 16 December 1941 (age 84); Guardia Lombardi, Campania, Italy
- Education: Sapienza University of Rome
- Occupation: Engineer
- Relatives: Gerardo Bianco (brother)

President of the National Research Council
- In office 1997–2003

Lucio Bianco (born 16 December 1941) was an Italian engineer and President of the National Research Council from 1997 to 2003. He is the brother of Gerardo Bianco, the former Italian Minister of Education.

== Biography ==
Lucio Bianco was born on 16 December 1941 in Guardia Lombardi, Campania in Italy.

He graduated from the Sapienza University of Rome on 20 December 1966 with a degree in electrical engineering. He qualified as an engineer in 1967 and obtained a second degree in aerospace engineering from the same university. He then held a research position at the engineering laboratory of flight applied systems at the National Research Council.

From 1997 to 2003, he served a President of the National Research Council of Italy. He resigned from this position after a dispute with the Minister of Education, Letizia Moratti, and the commissioner of the board of the Council, a measure subsequently annulled by the regional administrative tribunal.

From 1990 to 1993, Bianco was an extraordinary professor of operations research at the University of Rome Tor Vergata. He was also the Director of the Department of Business Engineering at the same university from November 2004 to December 2010.

Since January 2005, he has been the national coordinator of the Inter-university Center for Operations Research, and since 2006, he has been the Director of the Masters in Network Systems Engineering at the University of Rome Tor Vergata.

Since 2007, he has been President of the Scientific Council of the NITEL Inter-university Consortium for Transport and Logistics.

Preceded by Enrico Garaci	President of the National Research Council; 1997–2003	Succeeded by Adriano De Maio
