= Rocca San Felice =

- Comune
- Comune di Rocca San Felice
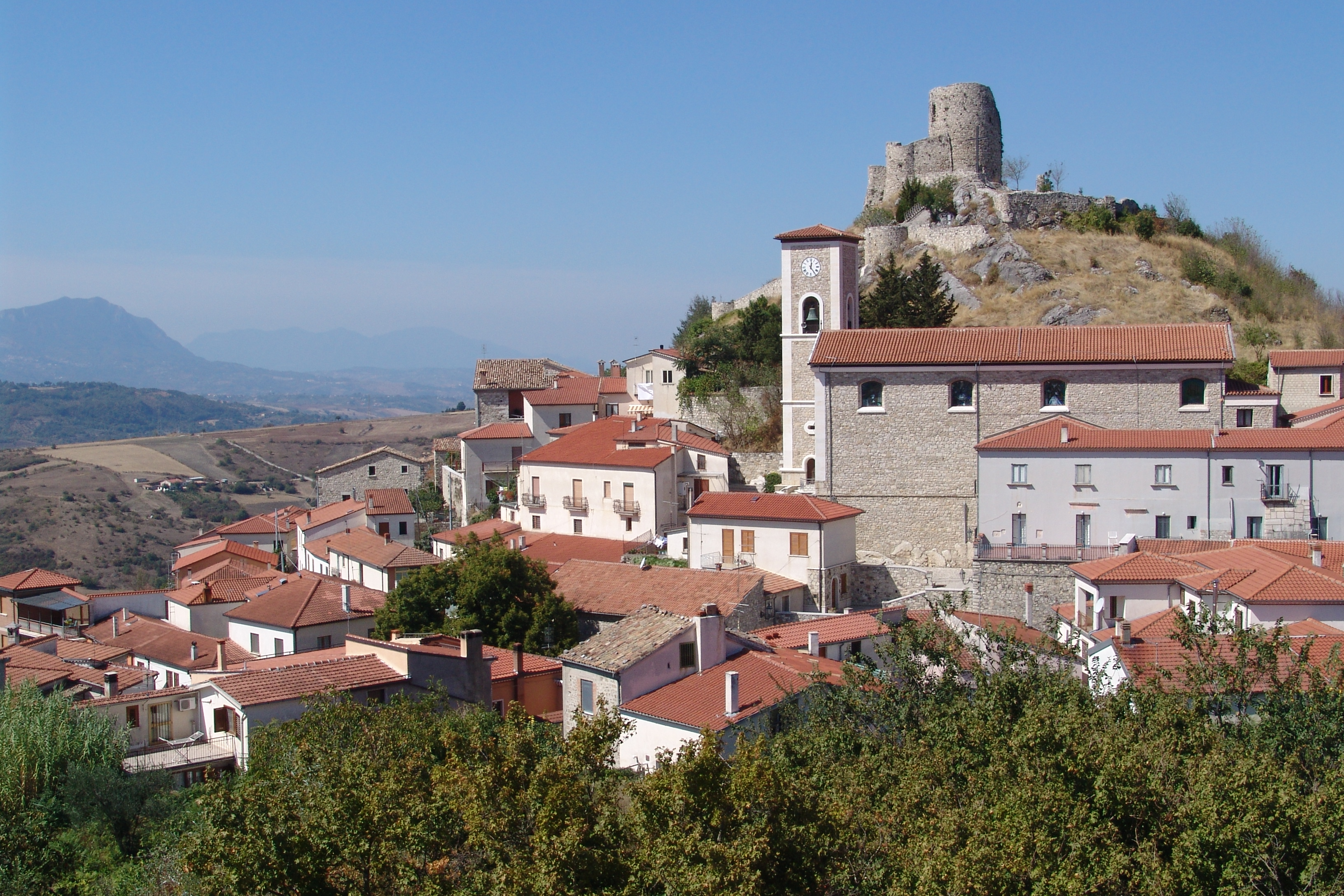

- Coat of arms

- Location within Italy Location within Campania
- Coordinates: 40°57′N 15°10′E
- Country: Italy
- Region: Campania
- Province: Avellino (AV)

Government
  - Mayor: Guido Cipriano

Area
  - Total: 14.41 km^{2} (5.56 sq mi)
- Elevation: 740 m (2,430 ft)

Population (31 December 2017)
  - Total: 835
  - Density: 57.9/km^{2} (150/sq mi)
- Demonym: Rocchesi
- Time zone: UTC+1 (CET)
  - Summer (DST): UTC+2 (CEST)
- Postal code: 83050
- Dialing code: 0827
- Website: Official website

Rocca San Felice is a town and comune in the province of Avellino, Campania, southern Italy.

== Geography ==
Located in the central area of Irpinia, the municipality borders with Frigento, Guardia Lombardi, Sant'Angelo dei Lombardi, Sturno and Villamaina. It counts no hamlets (frazioni) but some localities as Carmasciano, Fontana dell'Olmo, Palombaia, Santa Felicita, Serro del Bosco, Taverna Bruciata, Toriello and Valli.

The town is 4 kilometres (2 mi) from Sant'Angelo dei Lombardi, 10 kilometres (6 mi) from Lioni, 47 kilometres (29 mi) from Avellino and 50 kilometres (31 mi) from Benevento.

== Main sights ==
Among the main sights of the town there is the Castle and the old town, the Church of St. Maria Maggiore, the Chapel of Mary of Constantinople and the Sanctuary of Santa Felicita, in the homonymous locality.

=== Mefitis ===
The archaeological site of Ansanto Valley (Valle d'Ansanto), better known as "Mefite", is a sulphurous lake valley, few kilometres from the towns of Villamaina and Torella dei Lombardi. It was named after the ancient Italic goddess Mefitis, venerated by the people of Hirpini, and counts some ruins of a sanctuary of the 7th century BC. The little lake is formed by a pool of water, about 2 metres (7 ft) deep, that boils as a result of the gas emissions of the subsoil, consisting primarily of carbon dioxide and sulfuric acid. Because of this poisonous emissions, the surrounding area is free of animals and vegetation.
