= Mefitis =

Samnite goddess of the foul-smelling gases of the earth

- Goddess of Foul Waters and Fumes
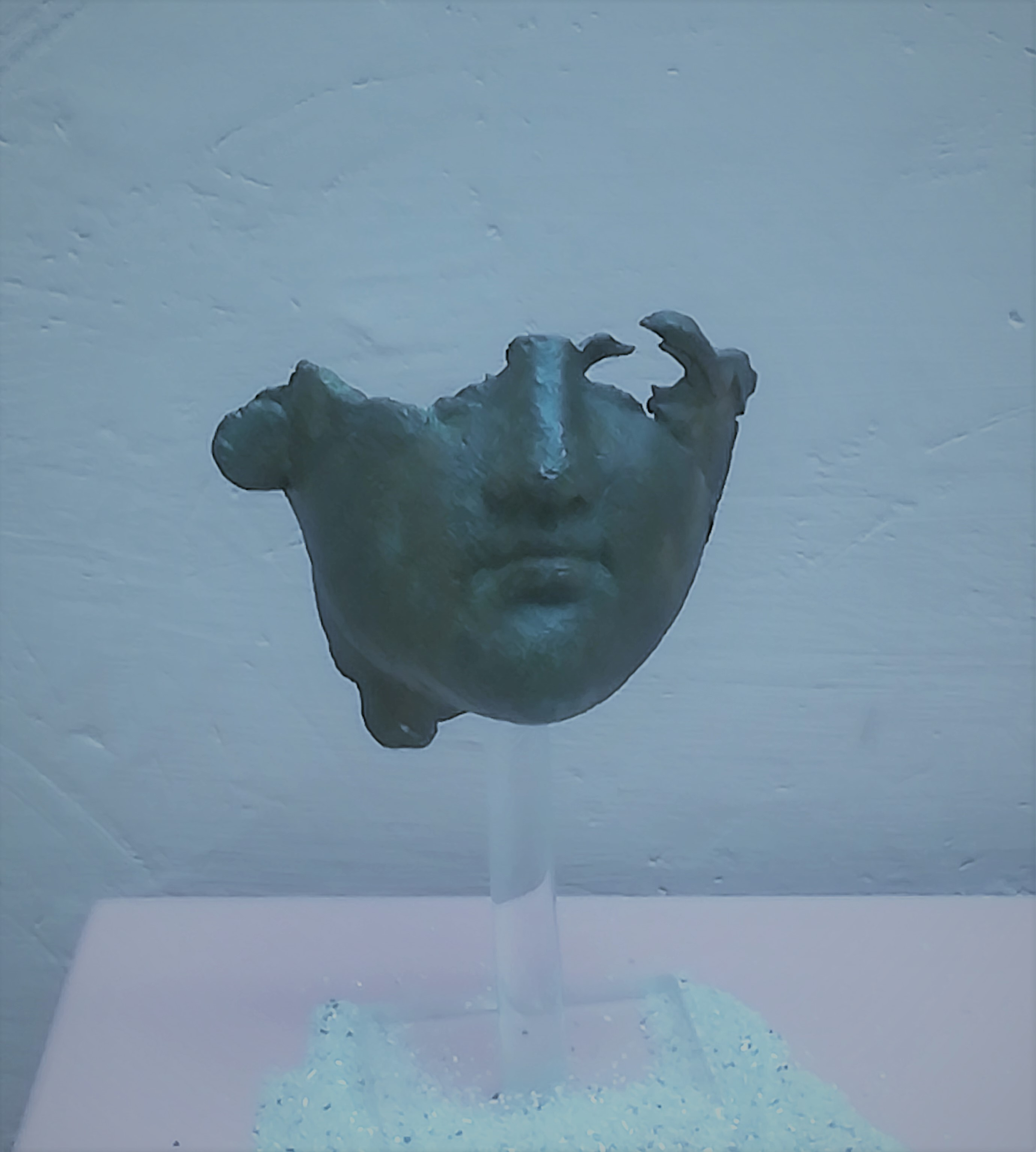
- Face of Mefitis. Bronze fragment stored at the National Archaeological Museum of Basilicata in Potenza
- Other names: Mefitis Aravinna; Mefitis Caporoinna; Mefitis Fisica; Mefitis Utiana
- Animals: Boar
- Symbols: Sulfur water, foul-smelling air
- Gender: Female
- Region: Southern Italy
- Temple: Temple at Lake Ampsanctus

In Roman mythology, Mefitis (or Mephitis; Mefite in Italian) was a goddess of Italic origins primarily worshipped by the Samnites and Osci in southern Italy. Mefitis was associated with water— particularly foul-smelling or sulfurous water—and noxious fumes. Her main temple was situated near Lake Ampsanctus, which was described as deadly by Cicero and Pliny. The temple itself was reported to contain poisonous gas that killed anyone who entered, and Virgil described it as an entrance to the underworld.

Though Mefitis is sometimes cast as the goddess of intoxication, modern scholarship generally disagrees with this assertion. Modern scholars have proposed that Mefitis served a medicinal role due to her association with sulfur, which Romans considered purifying; an agricultural role due to her epithet Aravinna, from arva ("soil"); or a mediatory role, with her sacred sites believed to serve as links between the heavens and the underworld.

== Functions ==
Mefitis was a Samnite and Oscan goddess worshipped from the 7th-century BCE to the 2nd-century CE whose cult was primarily concentrated in the southwest of central Italy. In ancient literature, she is often associated with the foul-smelling gases of the earth. It is theorized that Mefitis was originally a goddess of underground sources, such as natural springs—the fact that many of these springs were sulfurous led to her association with noxious gases. For instance, the 5th-century author Servius the Grammarian claims that any "foul scent is thought to properly belong to Mefitis," who he claims was "born from sulfur water."

Despite the plethora of ancient literary accounts documenting her supposed association with noxious fumes and geologic activity, the archaeological evidence from her sanctuaries does not necessarily support her supposed status as goddess of intoxication. The archaeologist Adriano La Regina notes that sulfurous water, though present in her sanctuary at Ampsanctus, is absent from the sanctuaries at Saepinum and Rossano.

=== Medicinal Role ===
According to the archaeologist Ingrid Edlund-Berry, it is likely that the divine role of Mefitis involved healing, as sulfur is ascribed medicinal and purificatory prosperities in Roman writings. For instance, Pliny the Elder writes that sulfur "has a place in religious ceremonies" ("habet et in religionibus locum") and is utilized for "purifying houses by fumigation" ("ad expiandas suffitu domos"). Moreover, the archaeologist Barbro Santillo Frizell notes that Virgil describes the usage of water to treat sheep scab, stating that "foul scab attacks sheep" and thus "the keepers bathe the whole flock in fresh streams." Geographically, the Ansanto sanctuary is situated nearby transhumance routes utilized by ancient farmers, which may indicate that the site functioned to treat livestock.

However, the classicist Allison Griffith argues that there is no archaeological or literary evidence corroborating the usage of these sites for healing or bathing. Regarding Rossano specifically, Griffith notes that the known votive assemblage at the site consists of militaristic objects such as greaves or spear points and also bronze figurines, none of which have any associations with healing. The archaeologist Elena Isayev argues that Mefitis was likely worshipped in various capacities depending upon the context of the needs of her suppliants.

== Mythology ==
In the Aeneid, Mefitis is implicitly associated with Albunea and the oracle of Faunus—Virgil claims that the grove of Albunea "breathes forth from her darkness a deadly vapor," which he describes utilizing the term mephitim, meaning "pestilential air". Moreover, Virgil associates the lake of Ampsanctus with the underworld and the god Dis, which may indicate that the goddess also had chthonic characteristics. An offering of burnt quince has been uncovered in Rossano, which may have been related to chthonic rituals. Amongst the numerous votive pits at Rossano, there are vessels marked by perforations at their bottoms, which—according to Isayev—may indicate the objects were intended to serve as libations to an underworld deity.

Servius, in his commentaries on the Aeneid, mentions that "some" ("alii") claim that Mefitis was connected to the goddess Leucothea in the same manner as Adonis is to Venus and Virbius is to Diana. There is evidence for a relation between Diana and Mefitis, as an inscription propitiating Mefitis has been uncovered near Mount Tifata, the site of a temple dedicated to Diana. At Rossano, various statues dated between 150 and 100 BCE have been uncovered, two of which represent the goddess Artemis, the Greek equivalent of Diana. Another remnant of the head of a sculpture survives, although it is unclear whether it depicts Aphrodite or Artemis. Moreover, excavations at Rossano have also revealed one necklace with gold pendants resembling a half-moon— iconography associated with Artemis and Selene in Greek mythology. Szylińczuk proposes that Mefitis, as a goddess of mediation, may have connected to Diana in her capacity as Trivia, the goddess of crossroads and the underworld.

== Worship ==
=== Temples and Shrines ===
Placidus claimed that she was worshipped in "many places" throughout Italy, and that she had a sacred lake in Lucania from which a sulphuric odor was emitted. Tacitus mentions another supposed temple to Mefitis in Cremona, which he claims survived the destruction of the city after the Second Battle of Bedriacum as it was safeguarded by "either its position or its deity." The classicist Saskia Roselaar proposes that Mefitis—a goddess primarily worshipped in southern Italy—may have acquired suppliants in the northern Italian town of Cremona due to the arrival of migrants colonists. Mirabella Eclano (Irpinia) was the site of another temple. An inscription on the wall of the House of the Great Fountain in Pompeii mentions a festival celebrating Mefitis, organized by the gens Mamia.

==== Temple at Ampsanctus ====
Her main shrine was located at Lake Ampsanctus in Samnium. Today, it lies near the village of Rocca San Felice in the province of Avellino, itself in the Campania region. Cicero and Pliny the Elder both describe the lake of Ampsanctus as deadly, with Pliny more specifically stating that her sanctuary was afflicted with toxic natural gases and that anyone who entered her temple would soon perish. Servius designates the areas the "navel of Italy" ("umbilicum Italiae") and claims that the ancient Romans would pay homage to the goddess by performing animal sacrifices using the fissure's deadly gases. Many clay votive statuettes and other objects found in the Ansanto valley depict wild boars, perhaps indicating that these animals were particularly sacred to the goddess.

Virgil connects the sanctuary to the underworld in the Aeneid, describing the site as a "breathing place of savage Dis" and a "vast gorge from which Acheron bursts forth." Virgil additionally claims that an Erinys hides by the lake, where they relieve "earth and heaven." The site of Ansanto is now known to output significant quantities of carbon dioxide via degassing processes, which has prevented the growth of most plant species within the surrounding area.

==== Temple at Rossano ====
In the 4th-century BCE, a temple dedicated to the goddess was constructed at Rossano di Vaglio. Reconstructions of the settlement and the sanctuary are in the Museo delle Antiche Genti. Finds from this site include a set of 58 inscriptions, which were generally written in the Oscan language between 4th-2nd century BCE. Afterwards, perhaps as a consequence of the Social War, the predominant language of the texts switched to Latin. These inscriptions mention the names of other deities, such as Hercules or Mamers, which are typically accompanied by epithets referring to Mefitis. According to the archaeologist Ilaria Battiloro, the exact function of this onomastic formula is unclear, though she suggests that these other deities may be cast in a subordinate role to Mefitis. Uniquely, the god Jupiter—who is mentioned several times in inscriptions from Rossano—is never paired with an epithet relating to Mefitis. Excavations at Rossano have uncovered a bronze plaque depicting a female deity riding a dolphin, which may connect to similar dolphin plaques discovered in Monte Pallano.

=== Grove of Mefitis ===
Varro, a 1st-century BCE Roman polymath, mentions a grove of Mefitis ("lucus Mefitis") by the Esquiline Hill in Rome—a claim which is later mentioned by the 2nd-century CE author Festus. The supposed location of this sacred grove is shared with the site of the Matralia, a woman-only festival celebrated on 1 March. Nearby altars to Mala Fortuna, the aspect of the goddess Fortuna associated with misfortune, and Febris, the goddess of fevers, may indicate that the air in this part of Rome was considered unhealthy. The historian Agata Szylińczuk suggests that the proposed location of this Esquiline sanctuary would have been situated near the Temple of Juno Lucina—the goddess of childbirth—and also near the temple of Venus Libitina, a chthonic deity. According to the classicist Gianluca de Martino, it is possible that this supposed sacred tree-grove could reflect a potential role of Mefitis as a fertility goddess.

De Martino proposes that Mefitis and the Greek divinity Hera—who was adopted into the Roman pantheon as Juno—may have shared similar cult sites, as Varro describes a sacred grove serving as a sanctuary for Mefitis, which may parallel the groves at the Heraion at Foce del Sele and the sacred site of Hera at Capo Colonna. Simultaneously worship of Mefitis and Juno may have occurred at Contrada Mèfete, the place name of which implies former worship of Mefitis, with an inscription uncovered at the site directly attesting to veneration of Juno.

== Etymology and derivatives ==
According to the Italian linguist Alberto Manco, the system of the epithets that identified the goddess from place to place would prove her relationship with a water-based dimension. Many hypotheses have been posited concerning the etymology of the name of the goddess. One hypothesis suggests that the term may relate to Ancient Greek μεθύω ("methúō", "to inebriate"), with the inebriation coming to refer to the effects of the toxic gasses. However, Battiloro rejects this etymology, arguing that it is heavily reliant upon the association of Mefitis with noxious gases, which is itself—according to Battiloro—an unfounded claim. Poccetti has suggested a derivation from the words "*medhio-dhuīhtis", which perhaps meant "that which burns within." Alternatively, Poccetti proposed a possible connection to μέθυ ("méthu", "honey"), in which case the name Mefitis may mean something akin to "sweet as honey". Semantically, the relationship between the goddess and honey would perhaps stem from her possible role as a medicinal deity.

The classical archaeologists Angelo Bottini and Mario Torelli have proposed a possible relationship to Proto-Indo-European *médʰyos ("middle"), which itself may relate to the possible role of Mefitis as a mediator between the underworld and the sky. In support of this theory, the archaeologist Filippo Coarelli notes that her sanctuary at Ansanto is identified by Virgil as the "breathing place" of Dis, implying that the site was conceptualized as a point where the infernal and terrestrial spheres interacted. However, the name could also relate to a possible role of Mefitis as a guardian of communication and a protector of trade routes. Another possibility, advanced by the archaeologist Michel Lejune, holds that the domain of Mefitis may have encompassed multiple or all varieties of mediation, perhaps including both mediation of the divine and chthonic, and also mediation of trade routes and communication. More broadly, according to the archaeologist Giovanna Falasca, Mefitis may have represented the general concepts of transition and passage, as is perhaps reflected in her association with water. Falasca suggests that water, since it is an inherently fluid element, is therefore subject to constant change, making it a suitable symbol for transformations in general.

The etymological relationship between the name of this goddess and terms for mediation is also supported by the 5th-century grammarian Priscian, who compares the term to Ancient Greek μεσῖτις ("mesîtis", "mediator"), which he also claims to be the Greek name for the goddess. Likewise, Servius the Grammarian implicitly recognizes a Greek origin for the name, as utilizes the Greek accusative singular ending -in in the term Mephitin. According to La Regina the term entered Latin via Oscan, which itself adopted the term from Ancient Greek, perhaps via the Pythagorean cults in Magna Graecia. Moreover, La Regina suggests that the alternative spelling Mephitis is likely a later construction invented by grammarians. In particular, La Regina proposes that the ultimate origin of the name Mefitis may line in the Ancient Greek terms Μεμφῖτις ("Memphîtis") and "Μεμφῖτος" ("Memphîtos"). Μεμφῖτις ("Memphîtis") and "Μεμφῖτος" ("Memphîtos"). This proposed Greek etymology advanced by La Regina is premised upon her association of the goddess with Isis, who had a temple at the city of Memphis. In support of this etymology, La Regina argues that the /m/ may have been dropped prior to the /pʰ/ due to the nasalization of /ĕ/.

"Mephitic", derived from Mefitis, is now an adjective in the English language meaning "offensive in odor"; "noxious"; and "poisonous".

== Epithets ==
=== Mefitis Aravinna ===
At Rossano, Mefitis was paired with the epithet Aravinna. Etymologically, the name Aravinna may relate to the Latin term arva ("soil"). As a result, Battiloro suggests that Mefitis was likely conceptualized as a more benevolent deity, arguing that the epithet implies a link with crops, and therefore may indicate that Mefitis served to protect agriculture in some capacity. However, La Regina instead prefers to connect it with Ancient Greek "ἀραῖος" ("araîos", "prayed"), in which the epithet may not imply any agrarian associations.

=== Mefitis Caporoinna ===
The title Caporoinna may connect to Latin caper ("goat"). According to the philologist Mika Kajava, it is possible that the epithet καποροιννα ("kaporoinna")—which accompanies Mefitis at Rossano—could support the notion that Mefitis was connected with Juno, who was worshipped with the title Caprotina. Servius claims that many equate Mephitis with Juno, supposedly because some considered Juno to be "air" ("āērem") and because a "foul smell does not occur unless there is a fracturing of the air."

However, La Regina instead proposes that the epithet derives from Ancient Greek *καπωριακά ("kapōriaká"). which would have been the Doric form of κηπουριακή ("kēpouriakḗ", "curator of the gardens"), which was itself associated with Aphrodite. In another inscription, Mefitis is referred to with the title "διοϝιιας διομανα[σ] ("diowiias diomana[s]", "domina Iovia")," which—according to de Martino—may relate to rule of Juno as the wife of Jupiter. Alternatively, Szylińczuk suggests that this title may reflect the association of Mefitis and Venus, as the epithet Iovia is also applied to Venus at Capua.

Semantically, this epithet may reflect possible fertility connotations.

=== Mefitis Fisica ===
In Pompeii and Grumentum, Mefitis is attested with the epithet Fisica, an epithet of obscure origin. It is perhaps possible that this title is a transliteration of Ancient Greek φυσικά ("phusiká"), although it has alternatively been connected to Latin fidēs ("faith") and Oscan fisios. These two Italic terms may both imply a relationship with mediation, itself possibly related to the proposed divine role of Mefitis as a mediator between the heavens and the underworld. Mefitis may also have been associated with the epithet "διοϝιιας διομανα[σ] ("diowiias diomana[s]", "domina Iovia")" in one inscription. It is presumed that the text describes Mefitis as it was uncovered near a large altar by the sanctuary, which may imply that it was dedicated to the chief deity at this religious site, which was Mefitis.

There is also additional evidence for relation with Venus, as the epithet Fisica may also be utilized for Venus in Pompeii. Venus may also be associated with the epithet "μεφιταναι" ("mephitanai") in one Oscan inscription from Rossano. It is possible that the deity of Venus Fisica represents a Romanization of Mefitis, though Szylińczuk notes that the cult of Venus had existed in Pompeii prior to Roman colonization, contradicting the notion of such syncretization. According to La Regina, Venus Fisica may have been identified with Isis, perhaps indicating that Mefitis was herself connected to the Egyptian goddess. La Regina argues that—should Mefitis be identified with Isis—then the sacred grove called Memphi described in an inscription from Rome may be the same location as the sacred grove of Mephitis situated by the Esquiline.

=== Mefitis Utiana ===
The epithet of Utiana is attested in four inscriptions from Rossano, and a further three from Potenza, which—according to Battiloro—indicates that the title was significant to the cult of Mefitis, at least in Lucania. The term may connect to a possible Lucanian tribe whose name has been reconstructed as *touto utianom, though this theory is now largely rejected due to the limited evidence for tribal divisions amongst the Lucani. Alternatively, the name may also derive from a toponym *Utia, though theonyms marked by the suffix -ianus were typically formed from family names.

La Regina argues that the term could derive from the name of a hypothetical mountain *Utius mons, perhaps in the same manner as the goddess Diana adopting the Tifatina from Mount Tifata. It is possible that the epithet could connect to the nomen Utius mentioned on an inscription uncovered near Monte Pallano, which may itself imply a possible connection between the local cult of Mefitis and the Utii family. However, Kajava argues that the usage of the suffix -ianus to form theonyms related to family cults dates back to the Late Republican period, whereas Mefitis is attested with the epithet Utianus as early as the 3rd-century BCE. Kajava notes that the name Utius is never attested in Lucania and only sparsely attested in Oscan-speaking areas, whereas the term Utianus is attested twice as a nomen in Lucania, though Kajava suggests that the latter name may have derived from the divine epithet. Another theory maintains that the epithet could relate to Umbrian utur and Ancient Greek ὕδωρ, both of which mean "water".

Utiana may also be ascribed to Venus in one Latin inscription from Rossano, further reinforcing a connection between the two goddesses.

== See also ==
- Avernus
- Mefite of Rocca San Felice
- Cloacina
