= National Archaeological Museum of Basilicata =

- Museo archeologico nazionale della Basilicata
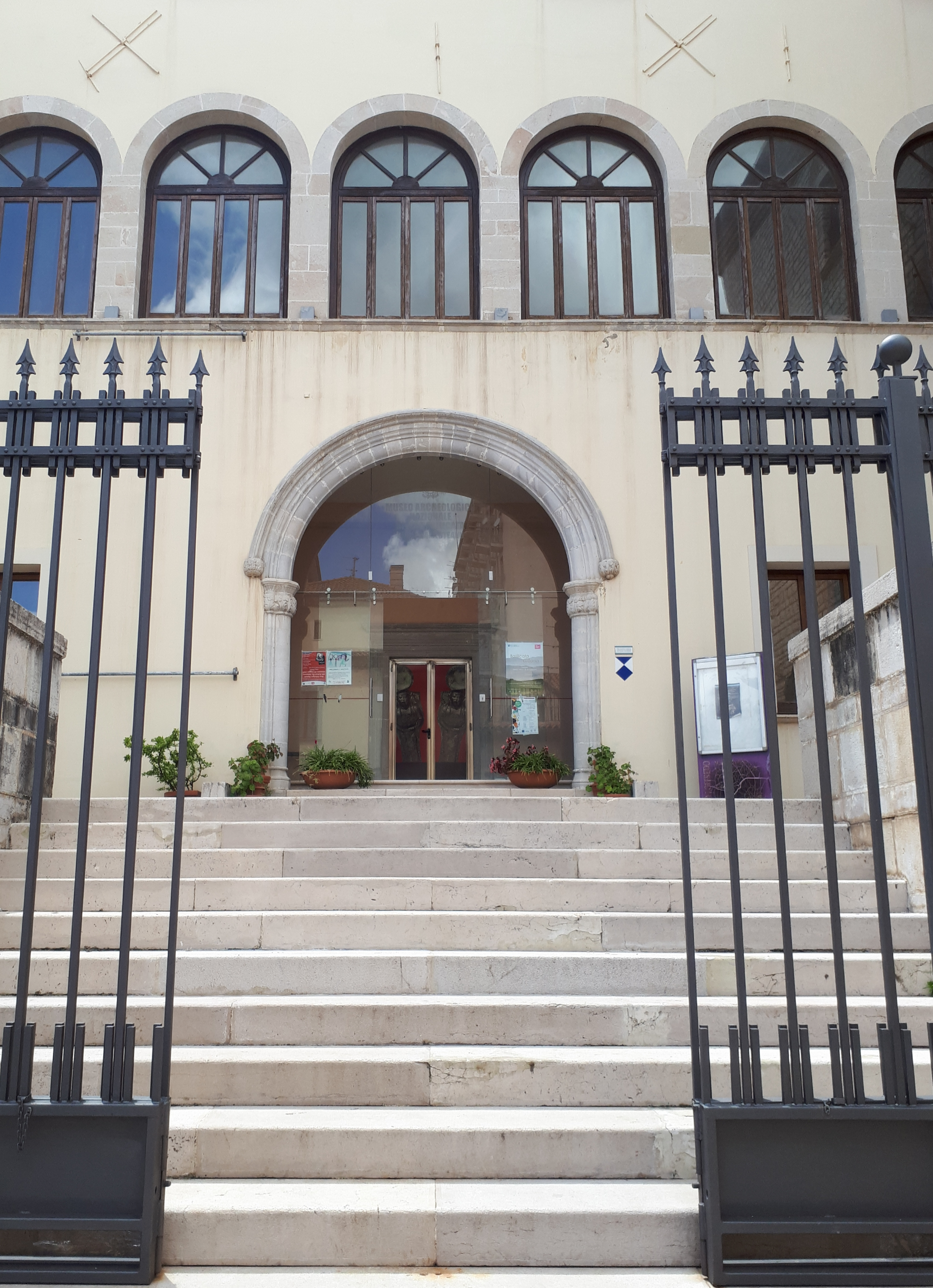
- Location: Potenza, Italy
- Coordinates: 40°38′23″N 15°48′22″E
- Type: Archaeology museum
- Website: http://musei.beniculturali.it/musei?mid=76&nome=museo-archeologico-nazionale-della-basilicata-dinu-adamesteanu

The National Archaeological Museum of Basilicata is an archaeological museum located in Potenza, Italy. It is located at the Palazzo Loffredo and holds objects discovered from excavations in the surrounding territory. It is dedicated to archaeologist Dinu Adameșteanu.

The museum provides a general overview of the archaeological finds of the region of Basilicata. The exhibition follows a chronological and geographical order.

== Some excavated items ==
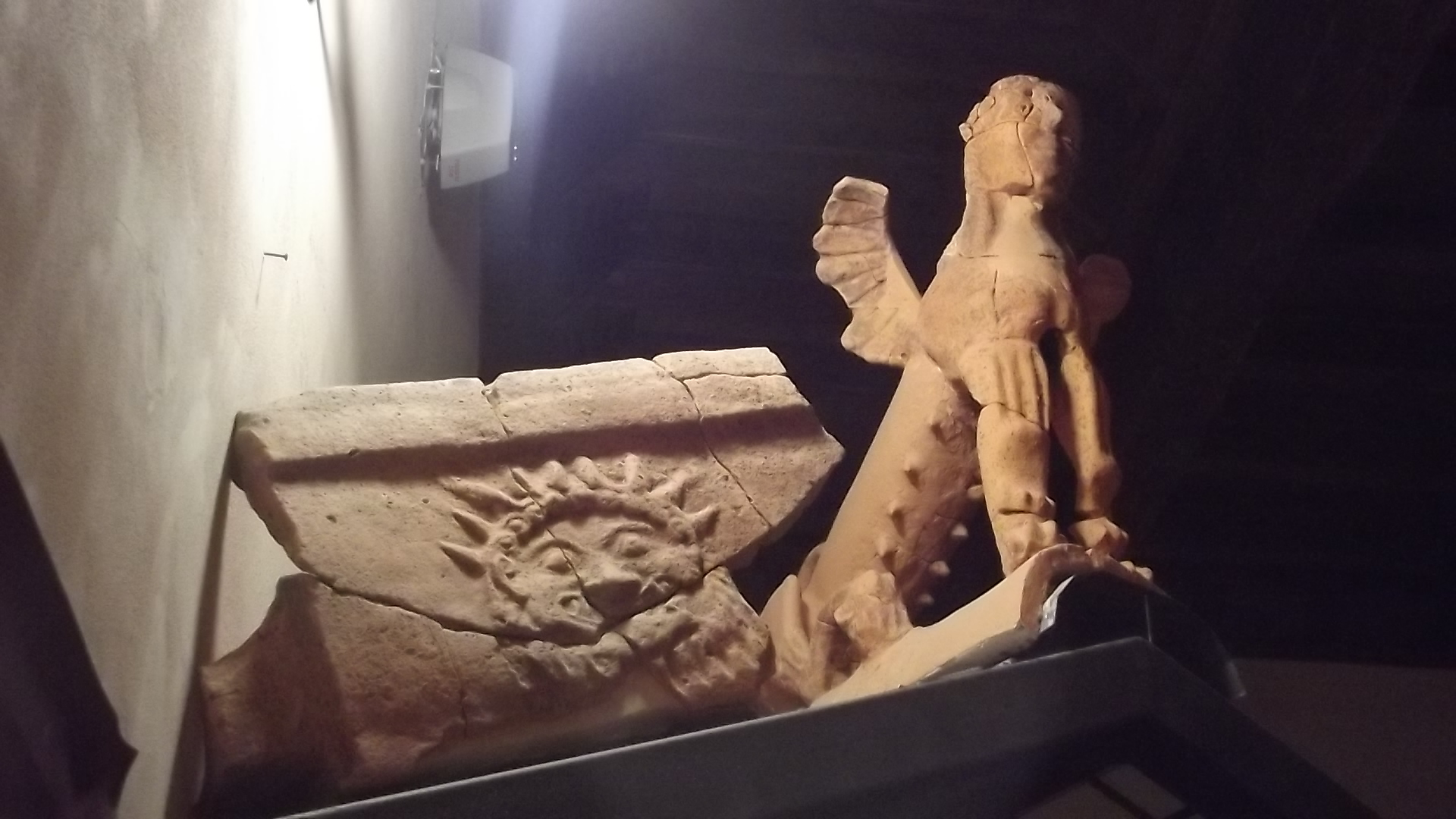
Lion

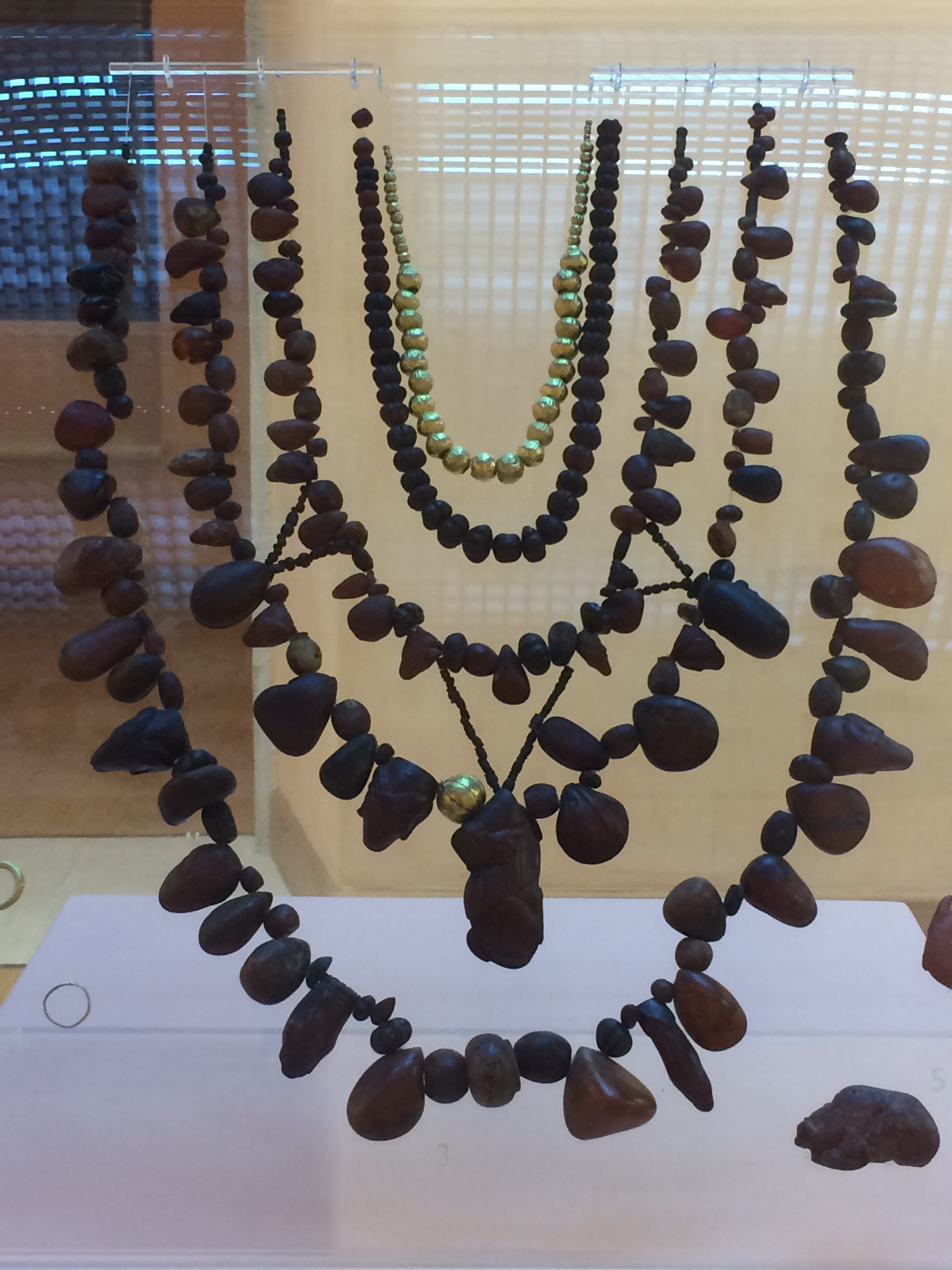
Necklace

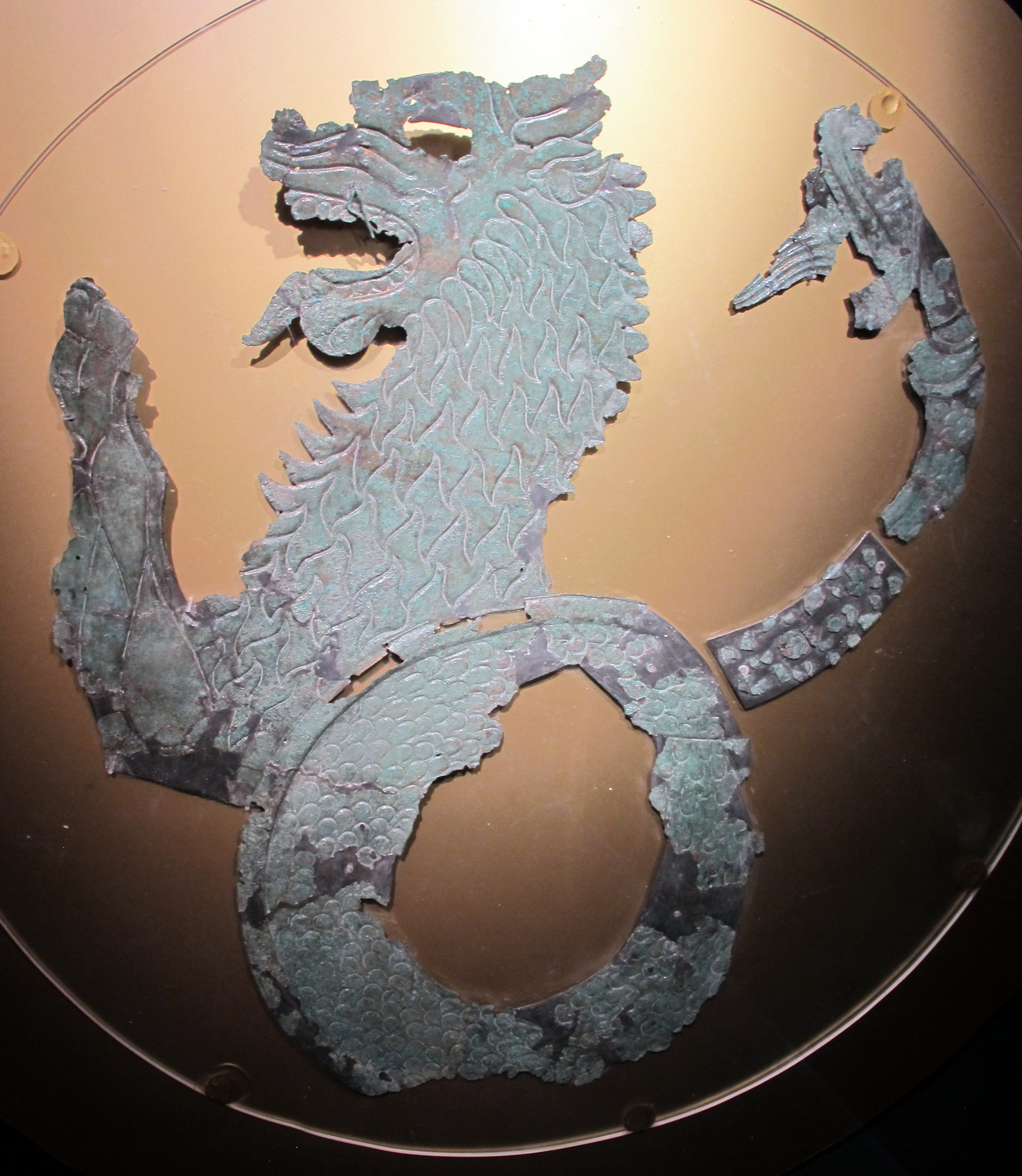
Emblem

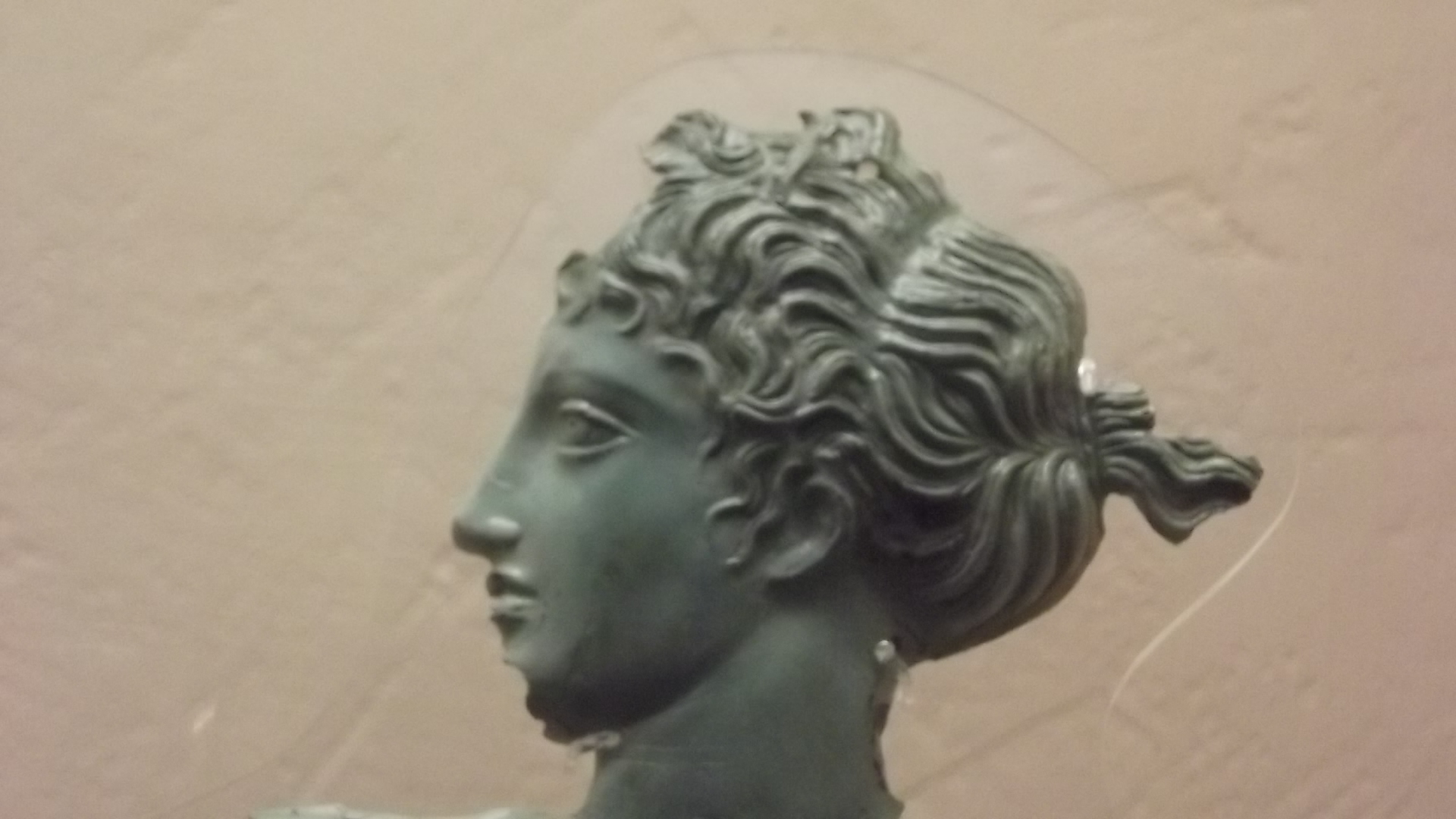
Depiction
