= Villamaina =

- Comune
- Comune di Villamaina
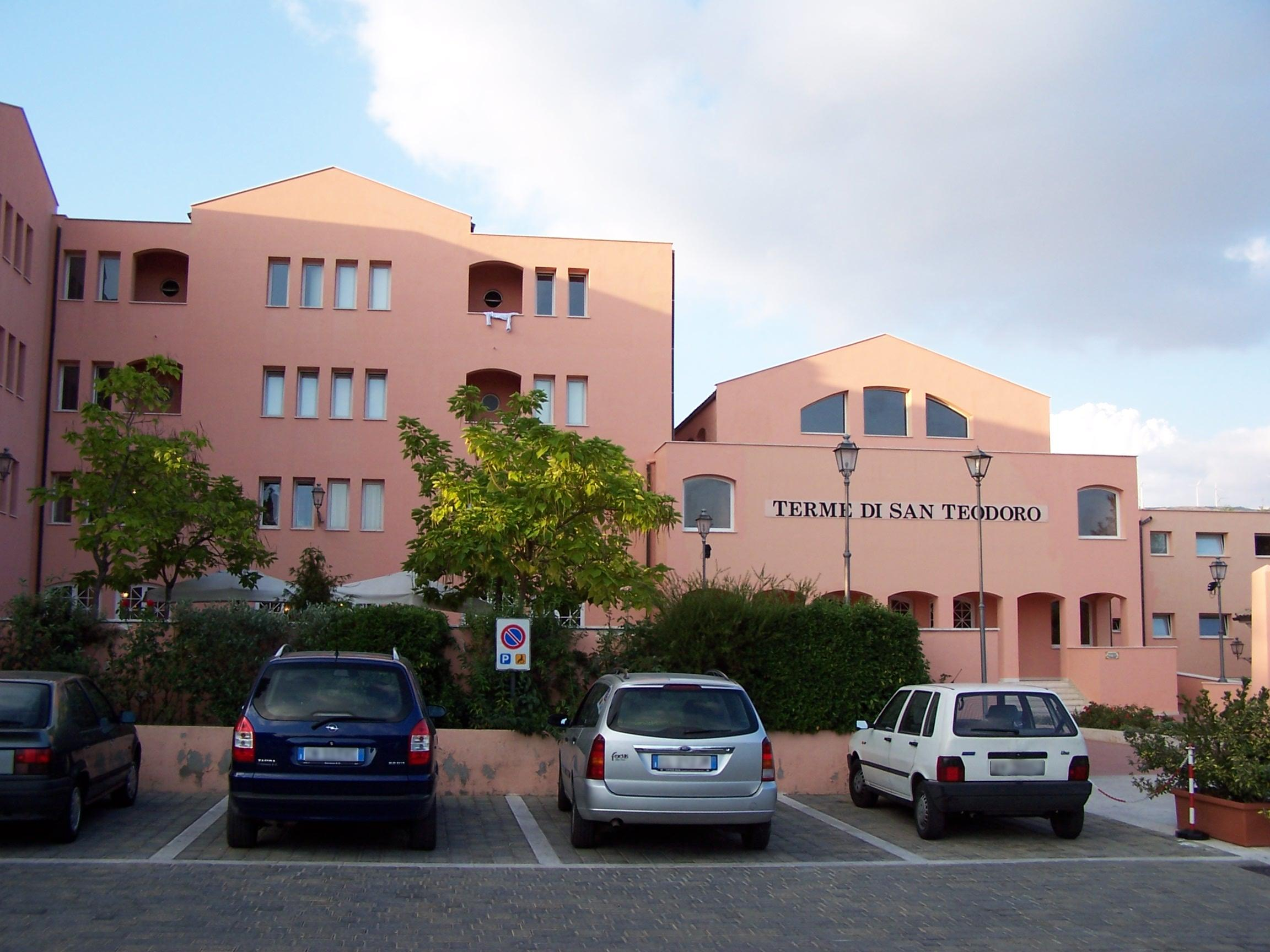
- San Teodoro spa.

- Coat of arms

- Location within Italy Location within Campania
- Coordinates: 40°58′N 15°5′E
- Country: Italy
- Region: Campania
- Province: Avellino (AV)

Government
  - Mayor: Stefania Di Cicilia

Area
  - Total: 9.04 km^{2} (3.49 sq mi)
- Elevation: 570 m (1,870 ft)

Population (31 December 2017)
  - Total: 977
  - Density: 108/km^{2} (280/sq mi)
- Demonym: Villamainesi
- Time zone: UTC+1 (CET)
  - Summer (DST): UTC+2 (CEST)
- Postal code: 83050
- Dialing code: 0825
- Patron saint: St. Roch and St. Paulinus of Nola
- Website: Official website

Villamaina is a town and comune in the province of Avellino, Campania, southern Italy.
