= Morra De Sanctis =

- Comune
- Comune di Morra De Sanctis
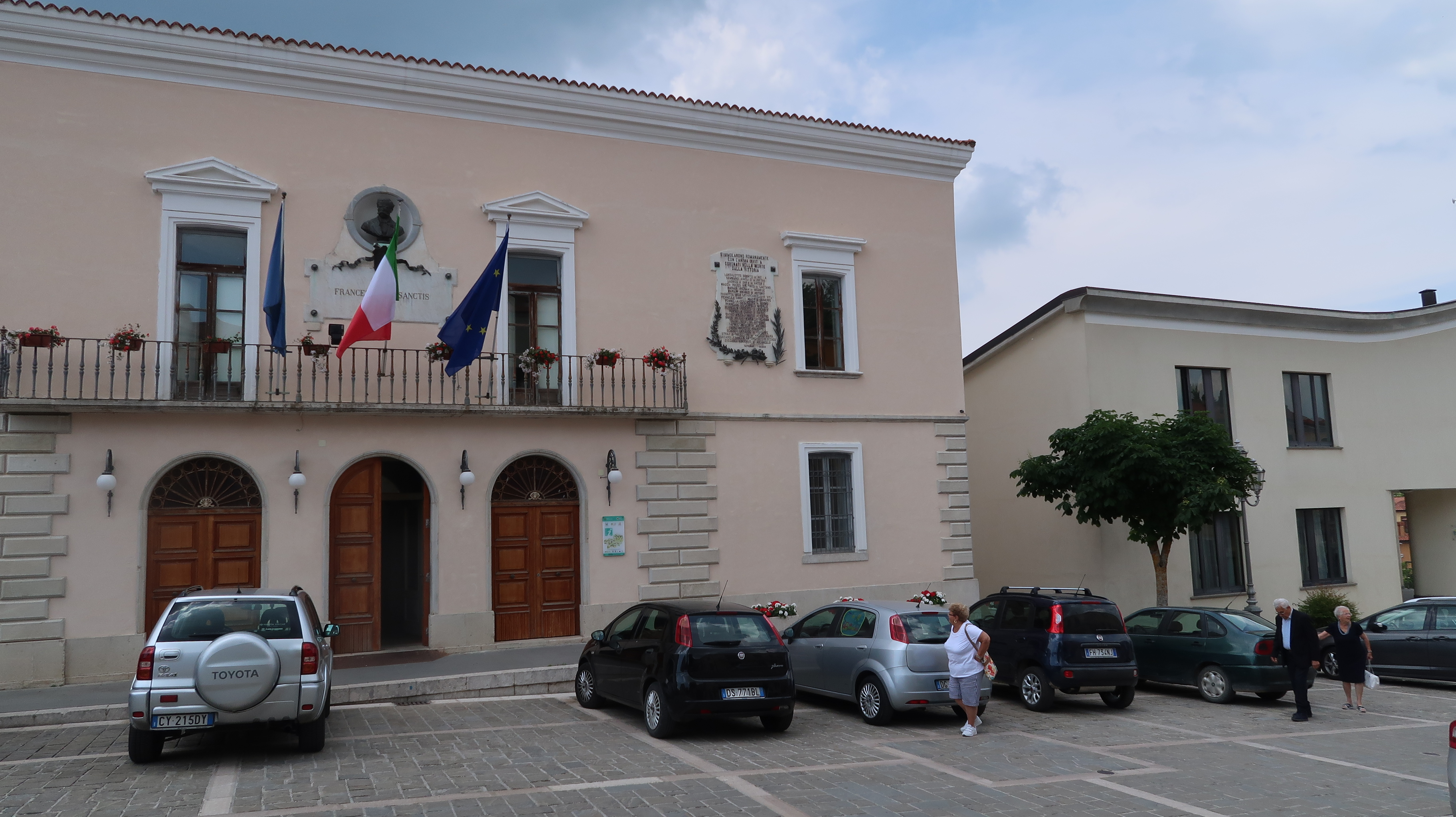
- Town hall.

- Coat of arms

- Location of Morra De Sanctis in Italy Morra De Sanctis (Campania)
- Coordinates: 40°55′48″N 15°14′37″E
- Country: Italy
- Region: Campania
- Province: Avellino (AV)
- Frazioni: Cervino, Santa Lucia, Orcomone, Selvapiana, Caputi

Government
  - Mayor: Fiorella Caputo (Siamo Morra Libera)

Area
  - Total: 30.41 km^{2} (11.74 sq mi)
- Elevation: 863 m (2,831 ft)
- Highest elevation: 912 m (2,992 ft)
- Lowest elevation: 440 m (1,440 ft)

Population (31 March 2022)
  - Total: 1,123
  - Density: 36.93/km^{2} (95.64/sq mi)
- Demonym: Morresi
- Time zone: UTC+1 (CET)
  - Summer (DST): UTC+2 (CEST)
- Postal code: 83040
- Dialing code: 0827
- ISTAT code: 064063
- Patron saint: St. Roch
- Saint day: 23 August
- Website: Official website

Morra De Sanctis is a town and comune in the province of Avellino, Campania, southern Italy. In 1934 the town changed its name from Morra Irpino to Morra De Sanctis for honouring its most important citizen, Francesco De Sanctis.
