= Mastroberardino =

Winery in Atripalda

Coordinates: 40.9232693°N 14.8296283°E

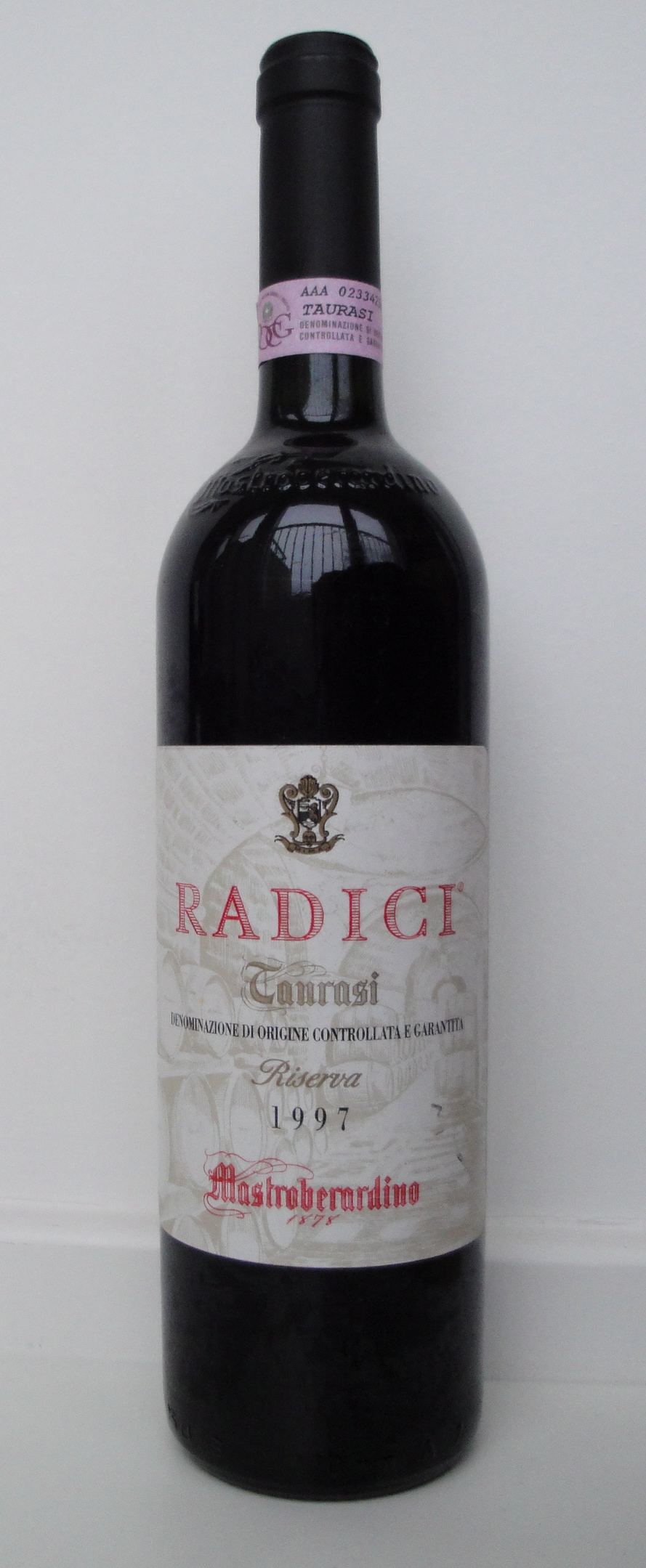
Mastroberardino's proprietary named Taurasi wine Radici

Mastroberardino is an Italian winery located in Atripalda, in the province of Avellino, in the Campania region of Italy. Founded in 1878, the winery is known for its production of Taurasi DOCG as well as its ampelography work in identifying and preserving ancient grape varieties like Greco and Fiano. The work of the Mastroberardino family, particularly Antonio Mastroberardino, in this field is widely respected and Antonio is often called "The Grape Archaeologist".

The winery is also behind the Villa dei Misteri project at Pompeii that is recreating the wines of the ancient Roman city by replanting vineyards that were destroyed by the eruption of Mount Vesuvius in AD 79 using the same ancient grape varieties, viticulture and winemaking techniques of that period.

For most of the 20th century, the winery was responsible for more than half of Campania's denominazione di origine controllata (DOC) wine production and over 90% of the Taurasi DOCG production. But those percentages have declined as other producers have moved into the area and started producing DOC/G level wine.

Today the family owned winery is operated by Antonio and his sons Carlo and Piero Mastroberardino with an annual production of around 150,000 cases produced from grapes grown in the family's 60 hectare (150 acre) vineyards in Campania and purchased elsewhere. The Mastroberardinos are widely credited with bringing favorable critical attention to the wines of Campania, particularly for previously unheralded wines like Lacryma Christi, Greco di Tufo and Fiano di Avellino.

== History ==
The Mastroberardino family has been producing wine in the Campania region for more than 11 generations. The present-day winery was founded in Avellino in 1878 by Angelo Mastroberardino (1850–1914), who was a Cavaliere (or knight) in the Ordine della Corona d’Italia that was founded by King Victor Emmanuel II following the Risorgimento movement, in which Mastroberardino partook. Knowing the export market for Mastroberardino wines would be important in these early years Angelo founded a logistics company in Rome to help facilitate sales of his wines abroad.

Angelo's son, Michele Mastroberardino (1886–1945), continued to promote the family's wines throughout most of the early 20th century with frequent travels and speaking engagements across the globe. After World War II, the family fell into the hands of Michele's sons, before Angelo (1917–1978) and after Antonio and Walter. After Angelo's death, a family feud between Antonio and Walters, in the late 20th, led to a split with Antonio maintaining the family name and winery while Walter took many of the family's best vineyards to form his own Terredora estate in 1994.

Throughout much of the late 20th century, Mastroberardino was considered the flag bearer of quality winemaking for southern Italy with wine experts Joe Bastianich and David Lynch noting that the winery's Radici wine from the Taurasi DOCG "essentially started the red-wine revolution of the Italian south". Master of Wine Mary Ewing-Mulligan has noted it was the critical acclaim of Mastroberardino's Taurasi Riserva from the 1968 vintage that brought widespread attention to the region and the potential of the Aglianico grape behind the wine.

== Pompeii excavations ==
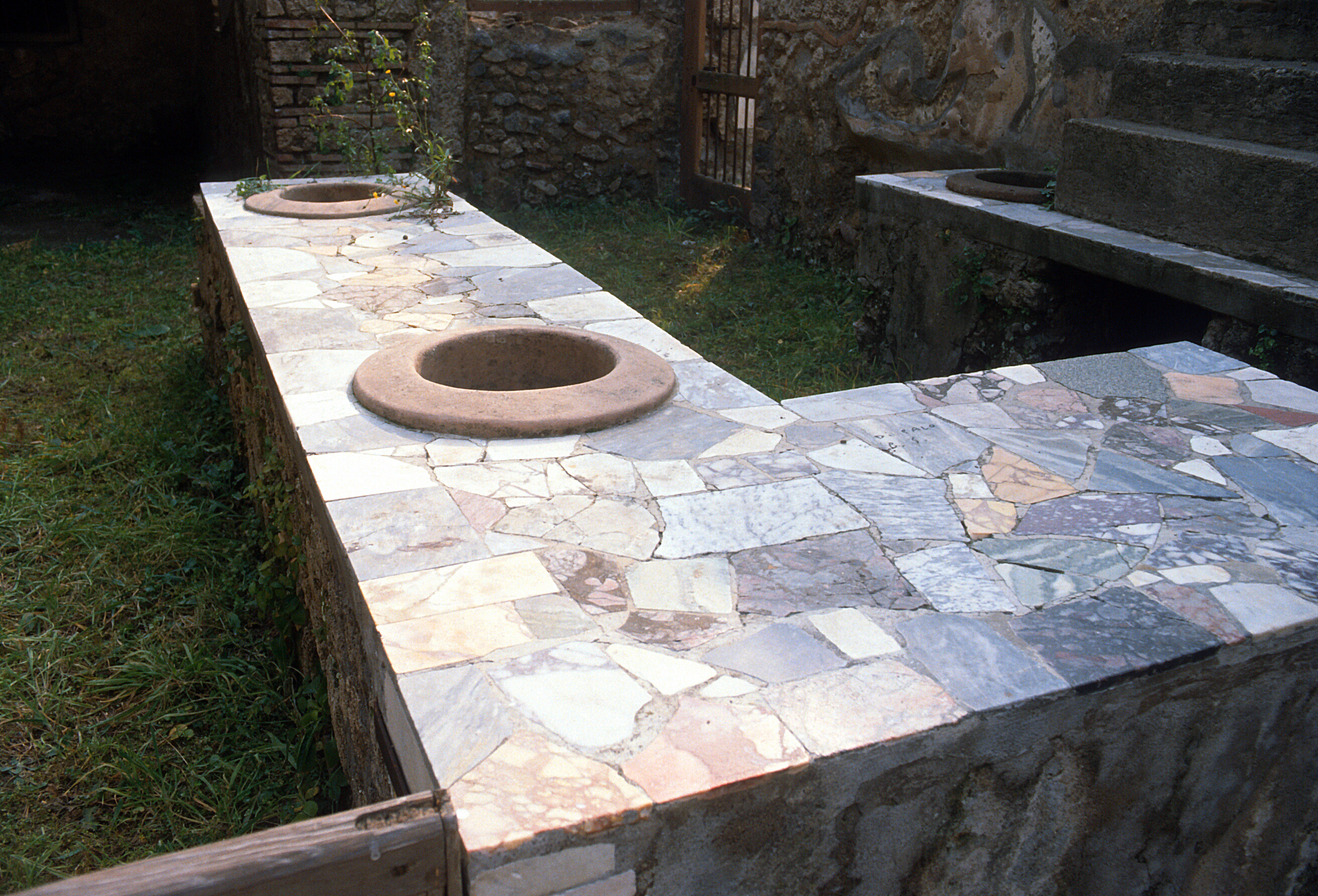
The Mastroberardino family has worked with Archaeological Superintendent of Pompeii to preserve and highlight the viticulture and wine culture of Pompeii. Pictured is one of the many wine bars discovered in the Pompeiian excavation.

The Mastroberardino family have been a leader in uncovering and preserving the viticultural history of the Campania region, particularly during the ancient Greek and Roman periods. This includes a partnership with the Archaeological Superintendent of Pompeii to excavate the many wine bars discovered in the city with their painted frescoes depicting the cultural use and acceptance of wine in Roman society. The Mastroberardinos have also assisted in the discovery of five vineyards within the walls of the city that also included underground cellars that contained the remnants of doli terracotta jars used to store Pompeiian wine.

=== Villa dei Misteri ===
In collaboration with the Pompeii excavations, the Mastroberardino family started the Villa dei Misteri (or Villa of the Mysteries) project in 1996 that aimed to recreate the wine of the ancient city of Pompeii using the same grape varieties and viticultural techniques of the period. Working with historians and ampelographers, the team examined imprints left in the soil from vine roots as well as DNA testing on grape seeds discovered in the volcanic ash and identified the ancient varieties of Piedirosso and Sciascinoso (also known as Olivella) as the most likely varieties behind ancient Pompeiian wines.

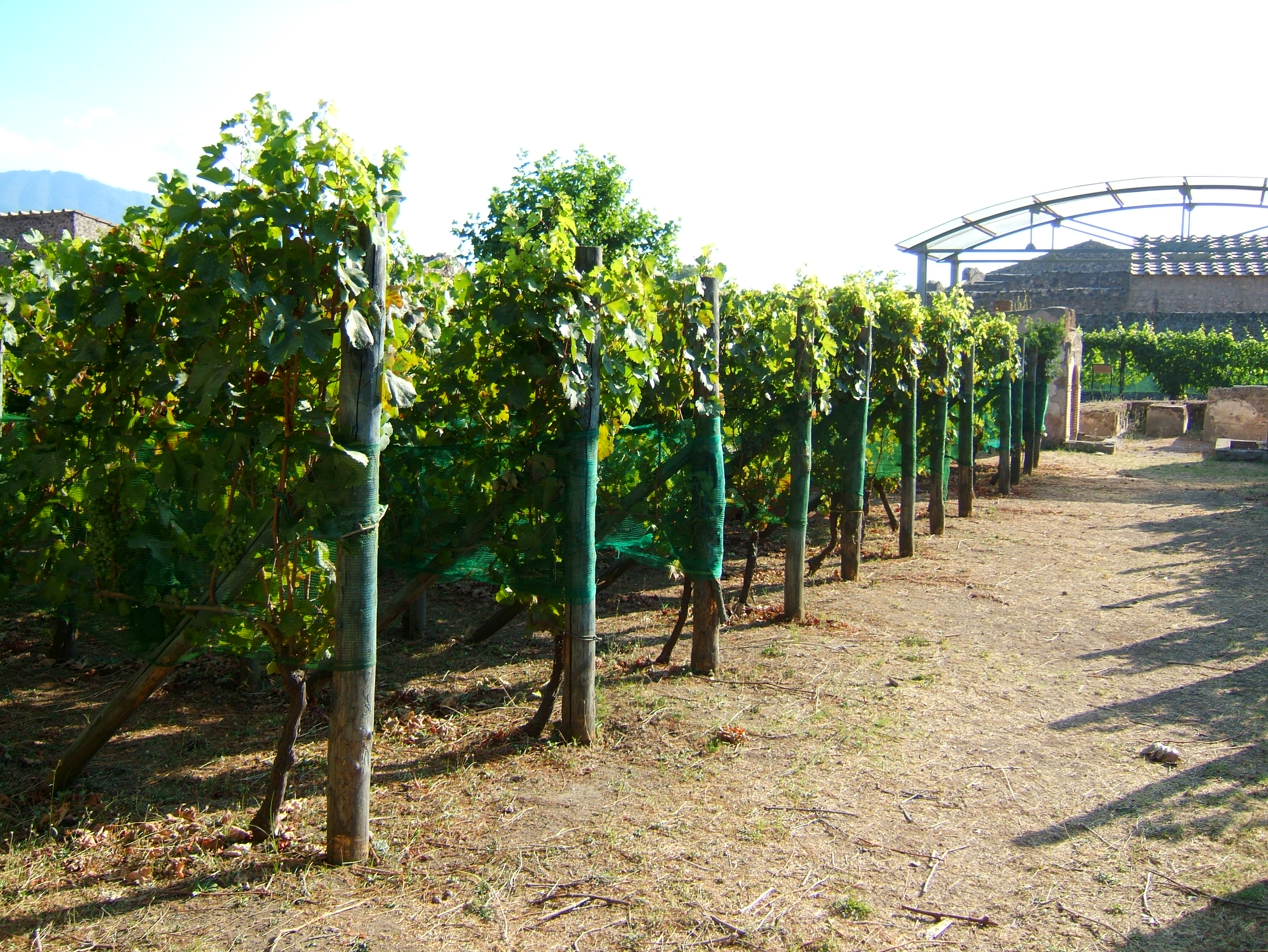
One of the vineyards planted within the excavations of Pompeii as part of the Villa dei Misteri project

Using the details discovered from the Pompeii excavations as well as the descriptions of Ancient Roman viticulture provided by Columella and Pliny the Elder, vineyards within the city walls of the Pompeii excavations were re-planted in 1990 with these grape varieties to the high density of 8 thousand vines per hectare that was typical of the time period. One such vineyard was owned by an ancient Pompeiian named Eusino who also owned a tavern in the city. Using chestnut stakes like the kind used during the period, many of the vines were replanted in holes still visible from the original stakes of an earlier vineyard that was planted two thousand years ago. The project is also using many of the same pruning, vine training and harvest techniques used during Roman times.

The Villa dei Misteri project has also adopted many of the ancient Roman winemaking techniques including extended maceration following fermentation as well as extended oak aging, even up to ten years for some wine. The project also does not fine or filter the wine prior to bottling.

The 2001 vintage of 1,721 bottles received mixed reviews. While some wine critics praised the concentrated flavors, red fruit and spice aromas, others criticized the wine for being overly tannic and phenolic and needing many years of bottle aging before being ready to be consumed.

Most of the bottles from the Villa dei Misteri project are auctioned off with the proceeds going to fund continual research at Pompeii and other historical viticulture sites in Campania.

== Grape vine preservation ==
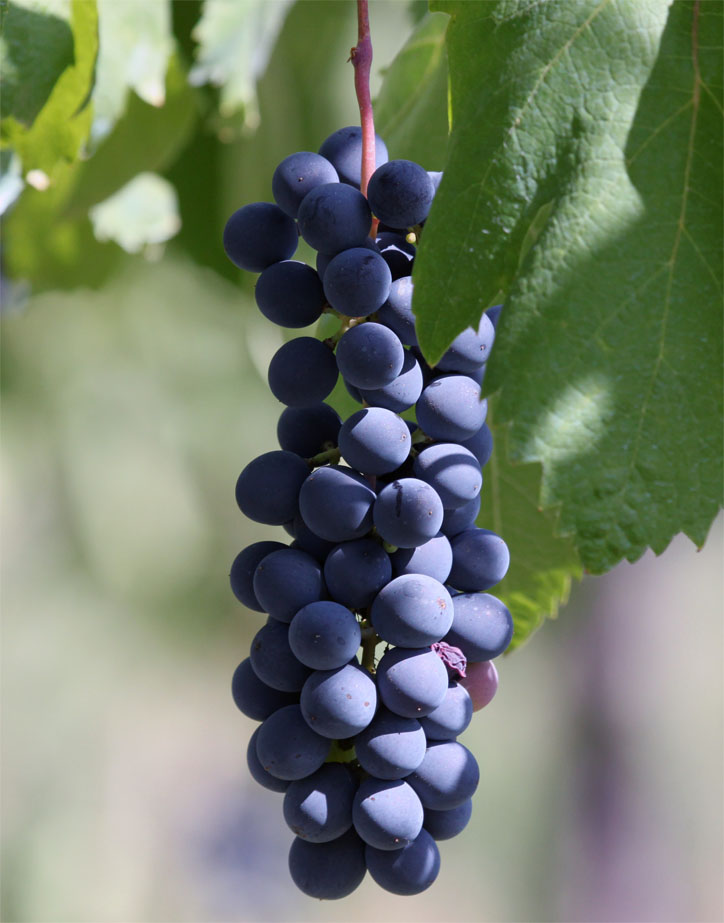
Piedirosso

During World War II, much of southern Italy's vineyards were devastated by the Italian Campaign. In addition to set backs during the previous world war, the Italian diaspora and the phylloxera epidemic of the late 19th century, many of the ancient grape varieties that were brought to the main land from ancient Greek settlers and cultivated during Roman times were at risk of extinction. Beginning with Antonio Mastroberardino, the tenth generation of his family to make wine, the Mastroberardino family have worked with ampelographers to identify and preserve these ancient Campania grape varieties including Aglianico, Fiano, Greco, Piedirosso and Sciascinoso.

== Viticulture and wines ==
At Mastroberardino, yields at harvest are often much lower than what is permitted under denominazione di origine controllata (DOC) and denominazione di origine controllata e garantita (DOCG) wine laws. (for example, in Taurasi yields can be as high as 10 tonnes/hectare and 14 tonnes/ha in the Aversa DOC). While several vineyards in the area are seeing the slow introduction of international varieties like Cabernet Sauvignon and Merlot, the vineyards of Mastroberardino are almost completely planted with native Campanian varieties such as Greco, Aglianico, Fiano and Coda di Volpe.

Many of Mastroberardino reds, such as the Aglianico for Taurasi, are aged in oak barrels for one to three years prior to release. While many Taurasi wines include blended portions of Barbera, Sangiovese and Piedirosso, Mastroberardino is one of the few producers who make their DOCG wine as a 100% varietal Aglianico. The winery also makes extensive use of soft pressing and often ferments their reds at cooler temperatures than other wineries. The white wines of Mastroberardino, including their Fiano wines, often will see some oak aging though for far less of a period than the reds.

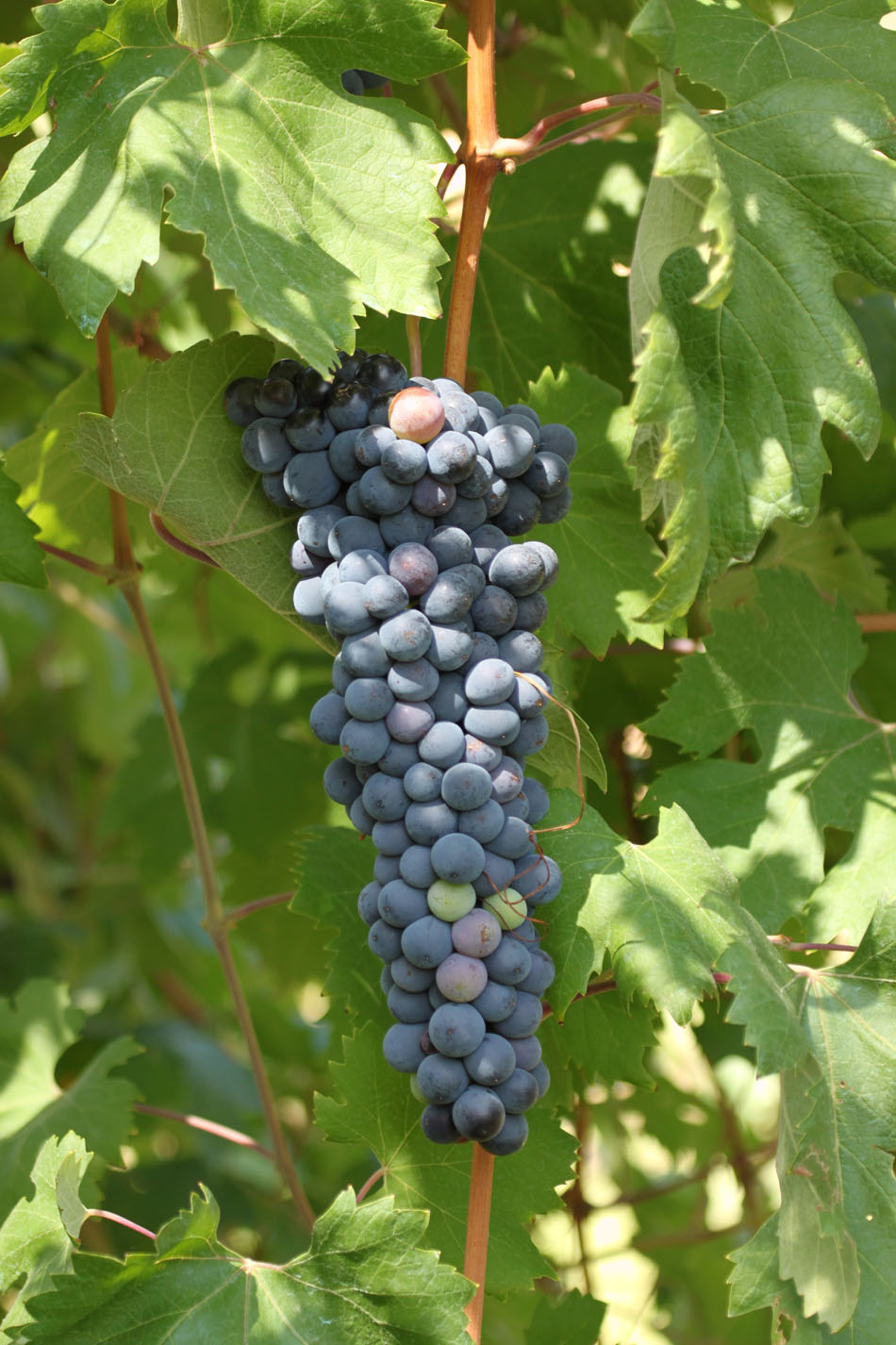
Sciascinoso

According to wine experts Joe Bastianich and David Lynch, the Taurasi wines from Mastroberardino have been called the "Barolos of the south" due to their strong tannic character and earthy, tar-like aromas that over time can develop into notes of cigar boxes, leather and tea leaves. In the hilly inland province of Avellino where the wine is grown, some aspects of the climate are more similar to the continental climate of the Piedmont wine region than to the Mediterranean climate of the coastal region of Campania near Naples contributing to the parallels between the two wines.

In addition to its DOCG Taurasi wine, Mastroberardino also produces several other Campanian DOC and indicazione geografica tipica (IGT) wines as well as passito and grappa. Among the wines they produce include Lacryma Christi, Fiano di Avellino, Falanghina from the Irpinia DOC and Greco di Tufo. Additionally they produce the Villa dei Misteri rosso wine from Pompeiano IGT from vineyards located within ancient excavation of the ancient city of Pompeii.
