= Pallagrello =

Pallagrello is a synonym for several Italian wine grape varieties including:

- Coda di Volpe
- Pallagrello bianco
- Pallagrello nero
