= Barbera del Sannio =

Variety of grape

Barbera del Sannio is a red Italian wine grape variety that is grown in the Campania region of southern Italy. Despite the similarities in name and appearance, the grape has no close genetic relationship with the Piedmont wine grapes Barbera or Barbera bianca or the Sardinian wine grape Barbera Sarda and is, instead, more closely related to the Campanian varieties Casavecchia and Catalanesca and the Apulian grape Nero di Troia.

In Campania, Barbera del Sannio is often used as a blending variety that adds color and aroma notes to the wine but it is also permitted to be made as a varietal wine in Denominazione di origine controllata (DOC) of Sannio.

== History and relationship to other grapes ==
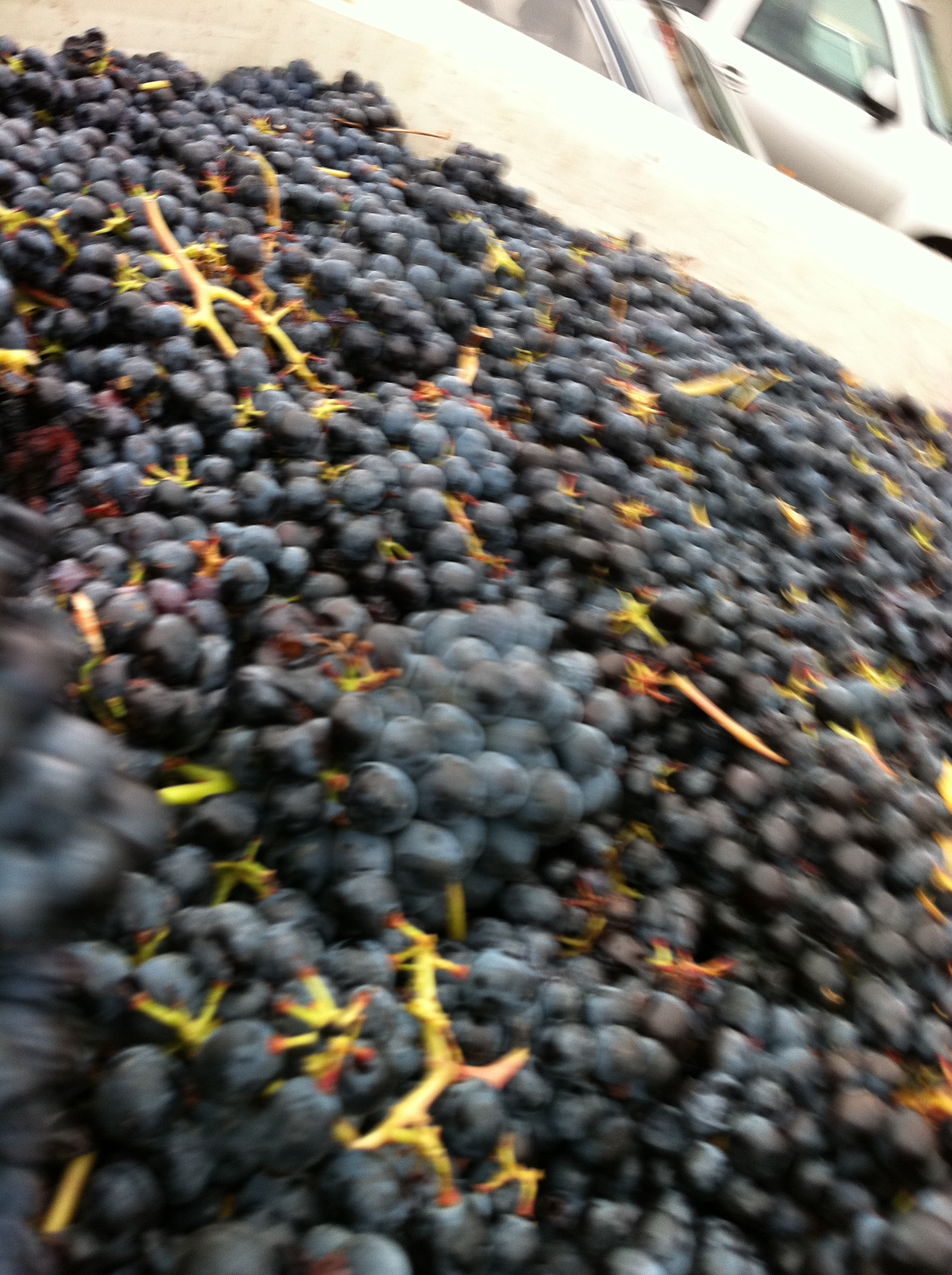
Despite similarities in their name, Barbera del Sannio has no close genetic relationship to the Barbera grape (pictured) grown in Piedmont and elsewhere in the world.

Ampelographers believe that the first documented account of Barbera del Sannio was in 1844 by Italian botanist Guglielmo Gasparrini in his account of native plant life in southern Italy. Gasparrini used the old synonyms Lugliese and Lugliatica to describe the grape with Luglio being the Italian word for the month of July, a potential reference to the color change of veraison during the growing season when the hard white berries of the vine start to turn dark red. By 1875, the grape was known as Barbera, being described by ampelographer Giuseppe Froio as similar in appearance to the Piedmont variety.

For most of the 20th century, Barbera del Sannio was thought to be a local clone of the Piedmontese Barbera which created confusion in the DOC wine laws and regulations for regions where the two grapes were grown. It wasn't until the early 21st century when DNA analysis showed that the two grape varieties were distinct and that Barbera del Sannio shared no close genetic relationship with any Piedmontese variety (even the similarly named Barbera bianca). Instead, Barbera del Sannio appears to be closely related to several southern Italian varieties such as Nero di Troia (also known as Uva di Troia and Summariello) grape of Apulia and the Campanian varieties of Casavecchia and Catalanesca. However, since Barbera del Sannio (or its close relations) do not appear to be closely related to older Campanian varieties, such as Aglianico, Piedirosso, Falanghina, Fiano, Greco and Coda di Volpe, ampelographers believe that the vine was a relatively recent introduction to Campania.

== Viticulture ==
Barbera del Sannio is a very vigorous vine that can be prone to producing a large, leafy canopy if not kept in check by pruning and canopy management techniques. The vine produces berries with very thick skins, rich in phenolics and color compounds, that also gives the vine some resistance to the viticultural hazard of botrytis bunch rot.

== Wine regions ==
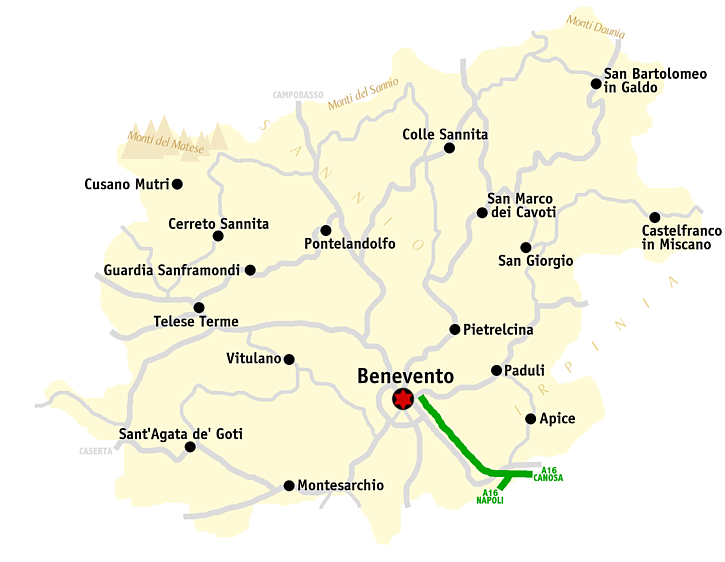
The Sannio Hills runs through the center of the province of Benevento.

Most plantings of Barbera del Sannio can be found in province of Benevento in Campania, particularly around the village of Castelvenere. The grape can be used as a minor blending component for several Campanian DOC wines but can also be produced as a varietal in the Sannio DOC which covers the Sannio Hills that run through the heart of Campanian in the Benevento province.

Barbera del Sannio grapes destined for DOC red or rosé production in Sannio must be harvested to a yield no greater than 12 tonnes/hectare. The generic DOC red and rosé wines (non varietal) are made from a blend of at least 50% Sangiovese with Barbera del Sannio and other local red grape varieties, such as Piedirosso and Sciascinoso, permitted to fill in the remainder. For both varietal and blended wines, the finished alcohol level must be at least 11%.

== Styles ==
According to Master of Wine Jancis Robinson, Barbera del Sannio tends to produce medium-bodied wines that are deeply colored and highly aromatic. It is most often used a blending component but some producers in the Sannio DOC have been producing varietal style wines from the grape.

== Synonyms ==
Over the years, Barbera del Sannio has been known under a variety of synonyms including: Barbetta, Lugliese and Lugliatica. However, the Vitis International Variety Catalogue (VIVC) currently doesn't recognize any synonyms for Barbera del Sannio.
