= Barberino =

Barberino may refer to places in the Metropolitan City of Florence, Tuscany, Italy:

- Barberino di Mugello, a municipality
- Barberino Tavarnelle, a municipality
  - Barberino Val d'Elsa, a frazione of Barberino Tavarnelle

== See also ==
- Barbero (disambiguation)
- Barberini (disambiguation)
