= Barbera (grapes) =

Barbera is a name shared by several wine and table grape varieties. The most notable being the red Barbera grape of Piedmont in northwest Italy. Other grapes which are known as Barbera, either as part of their primary name or as a synonym, include:

- Barbera Amara
- Barbera bianca
- Barbera Ciaria
- Barbera del Sannio
- Barbera di Patrunat
- Barbera Sarda
- Barbera Selvatico
- Durasa, known under the synonym of Barbera Rotonda
- Ervi, crossing known under the synonym of Barbera x Bonarda 108
- Freisa, known under the synonym of Barbera
- Sanches, Brazilian hybrid grape crossing known under the synonym of Barbera Min
- Terzi 1, crossing known under the synonym of Barbera x Cabernet Franc N.1
