= Lacryma Christi =

Neapolitan wine

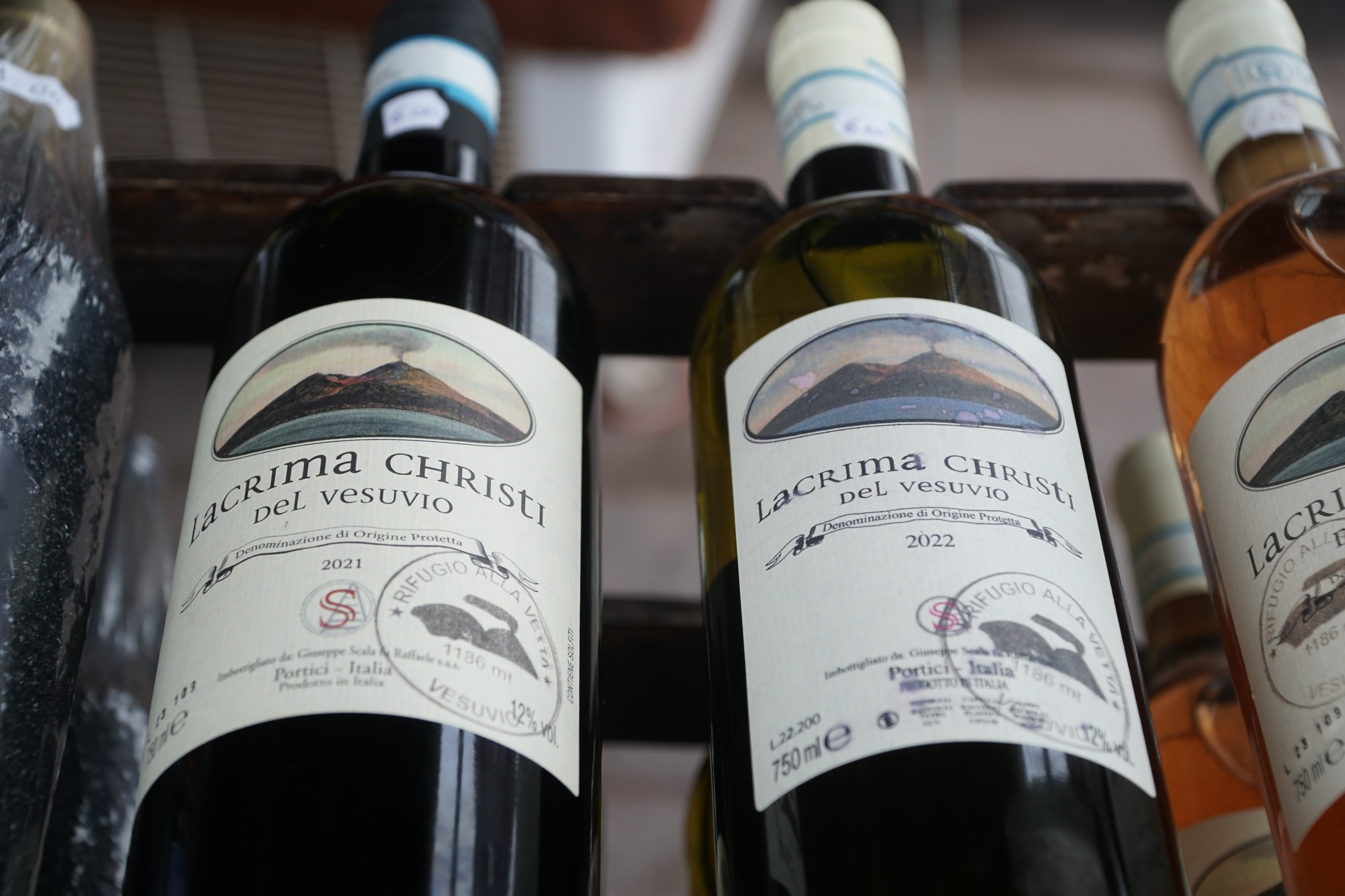
Lacryma Christi sold at a gift shop on Mount Vesuvius

Lacryma Christi (Latin for ''Christ's tear'') or Lachryma Christi of Vesuvius is a Neapolitan type of wine produced on the slopes of Mount Vesuvius in Campania, Italy. White Lacryma Christi is made mainly from Verdeca and Coda di Volpe grapes, with smaller proportions of Falanghina, Caprettone and Greco di Tufo included. Red Lacryma Christi is made from Piedirosso and Sciascinoso grapes. It is also, as archaeologists have discovered, the nearest equivalent to wine drunk by the Ancient Romans, having analysed microscopic residue left on the taps of the casks.

== Origins of name ==
The name Lacryma Christi comes from an old myth that Christ, crying over Lucifer's fall from heaven, cried his tears on the land and gave divine inspiration to the vines that grew there. The sides of Vesuvius are deeply scarred by past lava flows, and its lower slopes are extremely fertile, dotted with villages and covered with vineyards.

== Lacryma Christi in literature and media ==
Lacryma Christi is an old wine, frequently mentioned by poets and writers. Lacryma Christi was mentioned in the book by Alexandre Dumas, The Count of Monte Cristo, in W. J. Turner's poem Talking with Soldiers, in Candide by Voltaire, and by Christopher Marlowe in his play Tamburlaine the Great, Part II. In Walter Scott's novel Peveril of the Peak Julian Peveril and the Earl of Derby enjoy it for breakfast, along with fresh mullets. The Irish periodical writer and journalist William Maginn mentions the wine amongst other spirits in his poem "Inishowen" c. 1822. In the late work of the German novelist Theodor Fontane "Der Stechlin" (1898) the wine is mentioned to be served after lunch in a convent and is characterized to be of higher grade than a Montefiascone. Hart Crane wrote a poem titled "Lachrymae Christi" included in his 1926 debut collection White Buildings. The Dutch novelist Harry Mulisch mentions the wine together with the island of Capri in his 1987 novel The Pupil. In the short story "Rappaccini's Daughter" collected in Mosses from an Old Manse by Nathaniel Hawthorne, a glass of lachryma is drunk by the protagonist "which caused his brain to swim with strange fantasies".

In the 1954 movie, Three Coins in the Fountain, Lacryma Christi is mentioned as being the favorite wine of Prince Dino di Cessi, played by actor Louis Jourdan.

In The Great Warrior Skanderbeg, a Soviet-Albanian production of 1953, the wine is mentioned as a symbol of feudal luxury enjoyed by sybaritic enemies of the protagonist, the popular and prudent ruler of Albania who defeated Venice in the 1447-48 war and stalled the advance of the Ottoman Empire. When Skanderbeg's nephew, Hamza Kastrioti, joins the Ottomans against his country, a Venetian diplomat tells him that "gifts from Venice have arrived in Durrës for you: golden cups for your table, and the best wine of Venice, Lacryma Christi -- The Tears of Christ."

In the title story of Ray Bradbury's 1964 collection The Machineries of Joy, an Irish priest squabbles with his Italian colleague over space travel and its place in their faith; the two clerics reconcile over a bottle of Lacryma Christi while watching a televised rocket launch from Cape Canaveral.

In Jacques Rivette’s 1976 film Duelle, the drink order “Lacryma Christi” is used as a password to gain entry to a casino above a bar, first by the Sun Goddess, Viva, and then by Lucie, the hotel night porter and amateur private detective tailing her.

Jean-Paul Didierlaurent mentions the wine in his novel The reader on the 6.27 (2014): "... getting drunk on Christ's tears was the best thing that could happen to a Christian."
