= Barbera (disambiguation) =

Barbera is a red Italian wine grape variety.

Barbera may also refer to:

== Places ==
- Barberà del Vallès, a municipality of Catalonia
- Barberà de la Conca, a municipality of Catalonia
- Stadio Renzo Barbera, a football stadium in Palermo, Italy

== People with the surname ==
- Angelo Barbera, American musician
- Angelo La Barbera (1924–1975), Italian Mafia member
- Augusto Barbera (born 1938), Italian law professor, politician and judge
- Gioacchino La Barbera (born 1959), Italian Mafia member
- Héctor Barberá (born 1986), Spanish motorcycle racer
- Jason LaBarbera (born 1980), Canadian ice hockey player
- Jaume Barberà (born 1955), Spanish director and TV presenter
- Joe LaBarbera (born 1948), American jazz musician
- John LaBarbera (born 1945), American jazz musician
- Joseph Barbera (1911–2006), American cartoonist
- Luciano Barbera, Italian sartorial menswear designer
- Mary Ellen Barbera (born 1951), American lawyer and judge
- Pat LaBarbera (born 1944), American-Canadian jazz musician
- Peter LaBarbera (born 1963), American social activist
- Rita Barberá Nolla (1948–2016), Spanish politician
- Roberto La Barbera (born 1967), Italian paralympic athlete
- Salvatore La Barbera (1922–1963), Italian Mafia member
- Vincenzo La Barbera (c. 1577–1642), Italian Mannerist architect and painter.

== Other uses ==
- Barbera (grapes), several other grape varieties also known as Barbera
- Barbera d'Asti, an Italian red wine made from the grape variety
- Hanna-Barbera, an American animation studio

== See also ==
- Barbara (disambiguation)
- Barberi, a name
- Barbero, a name
