= Barberi =

Barberi is an Italian surname. Notable people with the surname include:

- Andrea Barberi (1979–2023), Italian sprint athlete
- Antonio Barberi (fl. 18th century), Italian engraver
- Clara Barberi (born 1992), Argentine field hockey player
- Dominic Barberi (1792–1849), Italian theologian and Passionist; beatified in 1963
- Enrico Barberi (1850–1941), Italian sculptor
- Giorgio Bàrberi Squarotti (1929–2017), Italian academic and poet
- Giovanni Luca Barberi (1452–1520), Italian historian
- Giuseppe Barberi (1746–1809), Italian architect
- Jacopo de' Barberi, or Barbari (c. 1460/70 – before 1516), Italian painter and printmaker
- Katie Barberi (born 1972), Mexican television actress
- Matilde Muñoz Barberi (1895–1954), Spanish writer of various genres
- Stefano Barberi (born 1984), Brazilian professional bicycle racer

== See also ==
- Barbera (disambiguation)
- Barbero, surname
- Barbieri, surname
