= Sbarbaro =

Sbarbaro is an Italian surname. Notable people with the surname include:

- Eugenio Sbarbaro (born 1934), Italian Roman Catholic prelate
- Tony Sbarbaro (1897–1969), American jazz drummer

== See also ==
- Barbaro (surname)
