= Piedimonte =

Piedimonte may refer to several places of Italy:

- Piedimonte Etneo, a municipality in the Province of Catania, Sicily.
- Piedimonte Matese, a municipality in the Province of Caserta, Campania.
- Piedimonte San Germano, a municipality in the Province of Frosinone, Lazio.

== Other uses ==
- Piedimonte bianco, another name for the Campanian wine grape Pallagrello bianco

== See also ==
- Piedmont, a region of northern Italy
