= Barbaro =

Barbaro (Italian) or Bárbaro (Spanish) means ‘barbarian’. It may refer to:

== Geography ==
- Mount Barbaro

== People ==
- Barbaro 'ndrina a criminal organization in southern Italy

=== Family name ===
- Barbaro (surname)
- Barbaro family, a prominent family in the Republic of Venice
  - Palazzi Barbaro, a historic building in Venice
  - Villa Barbaro, a historic building in Maser, Italy

=== Turkish admiral, Barbarossa ===
- Barbaros Hayreddin Pasha Turkish admiral
  - Gölcük Barbaros Hayrettin Lisesi, a Turkish high school
  - Barbaros class frigate, a class of Turkish warships

=== First name ===
- Barbaros Barut, association football player
- Bárbaro Cañizares Major League Baseball player
- Bárbaro Garbey, former Major League Baseball player

== Horse racing ==
- Barbaro (horse), a racehorse that won the Kentucky Derby
  - Barbaro Stakes at Delaware Park
  - Barbaro Stakes at Pimlico Race Course

== Music ==
- Allegro barbaro (Bartók) a piano piece by Béla Bartók
- Doces Bárbaros, a Brazilian musical group.
- "Barbaro", track by Jim Hall from Hemispheres 2008

== See also ==
- Barbara (disambiguation)
- Barbero, a surname
