= Taurasi (wine) =

Italian red wine

- Wine region
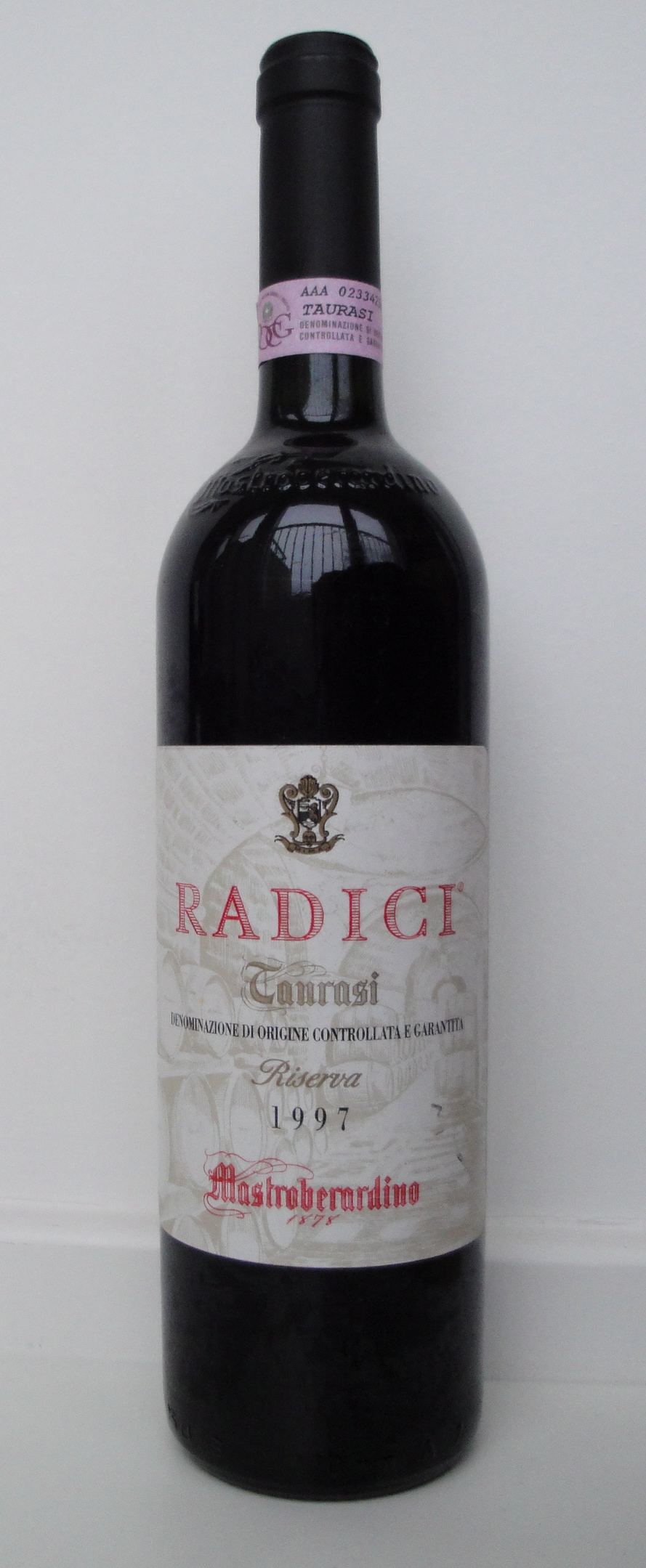
- A bottle of Taurasi Riserva from producer Mastroberardino
- Type: DOCG
- Year established: 1993
- Years of wine industry: DOC established 1970; promoted to DOCG 1993
- Country: Italy
- Part of: Campania
- Size of planted vineyards: 393 hectares (970 acres)
- Varietals produced: Aglianico
- Wine produced: 6,260 hl

Taurasi and Taurasi riserva are red, still Italian wines based principally on the Aglianico grape variety produced in the province of Avellino in the Campania region. They were awarded denominazione di origine controllata (DOC) status in 1970 and denominazione di origine controllata e garantita (DOCG) status in 1993. Produced less than 40 miles (64 km) from the other Aglianico stronghold of Aglianico del Vulture in Basilicata, the volcanic soils of the Taurasi region demonstrate the potential the Aglianico grape has to make wines on par with the Nebbiolo grape of Piedmont and Sangiovese grape of Tuscany. The popularity of the region's wine is a relatively recent phenomenon. Until the early 1990s, there was only one winery (Mastroberardino), producing wine for the export market. By the mid-2000s, there were over 293 producers in the Taurausi zone.

== Production zone ==
The vineyards may be located within the boundaries of the following comuni (municipalities) of the province of Avellino: Taurasi, Bonito, Castelfranci, Castelvetere sul Calore, Fontanarosa, Lapio, Luogosano, Mirabella Eclano, Montefalcione, Montemarano, Montemiletto, Paternopoli, Pietradefusi, Sant'Angelo all'Esca, San Mango sul Calore, Torre Le Nocelle and Venticano. The total area is about 42,000 hectares (100,000 acres) and is situated on volcanic soil.

== Winemaking ==
The Aglianico grape thrives on vineyards at higher altitudes, around 400 to 500 meters above sea level. According to DOCG regulations, Taurasi wines must be aged a minimum of 3 years prior to release with at least 1 of those years being in wood. For wines labeled Riserva, the wines must be aged for at least 4 years. The wines are made primarily from Aglianico though up to 15% of Barbera, Piedirosso and Sangiovese may be blended in.
