= Barbero (disambiguation) =

Barbero may refer to:

- Barbero, an Italian surname
- USS Barbero, a Balao-class submarine of the United States Navy
- Barbero-Immirzi parameter, a numerical coefficient appearing in loop quantum gravity
- Barbero rayado, tropical marine fish
