= Sciascinoso =

Variety of grape

- Grape (Vitis)
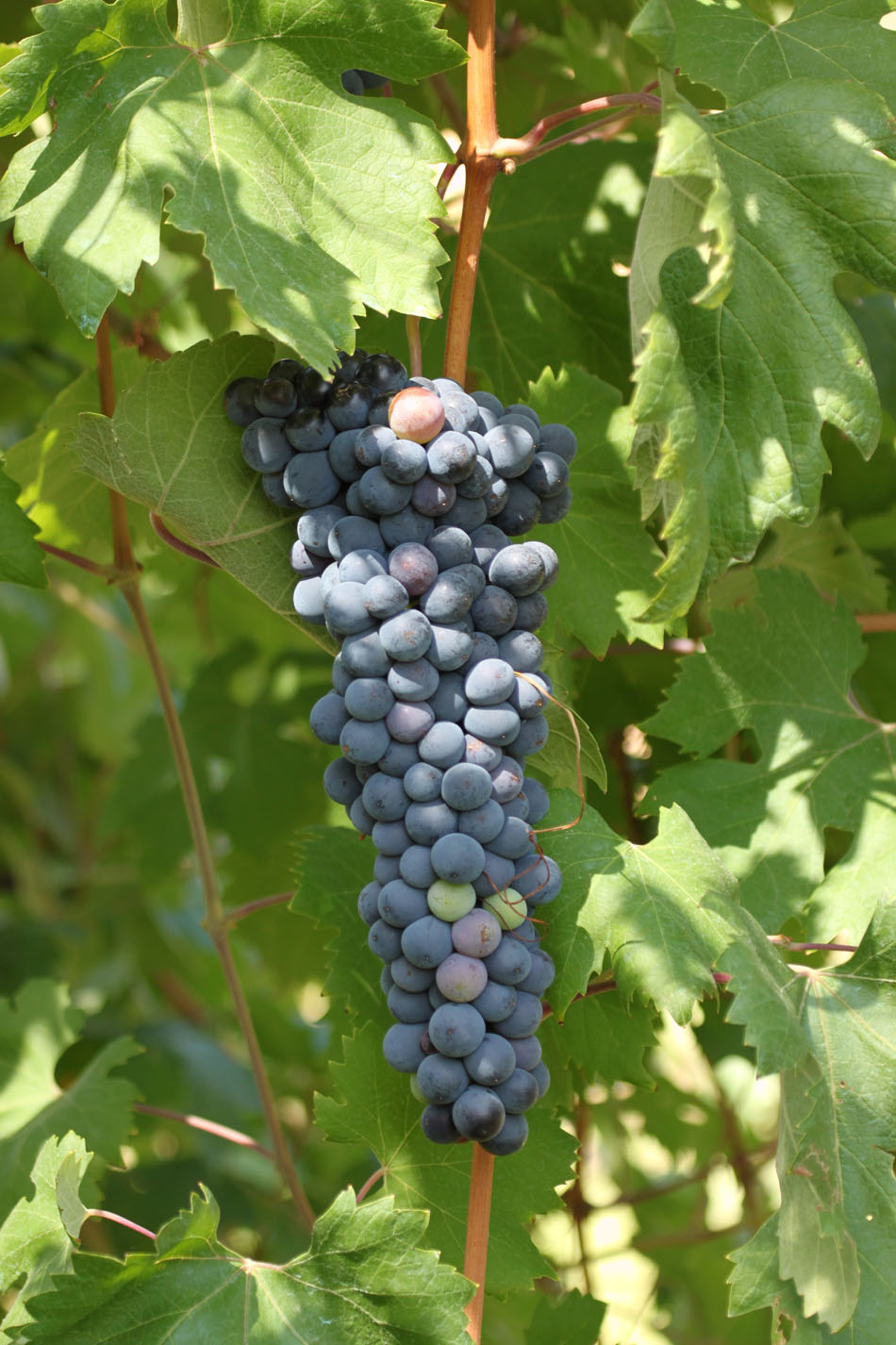
- Color of berry skin: Noir
- Species: Vitis vinifera
- Also called: See list of synonyms
- Origin: Italy
- Notable regions: Campania
- VIVC number: 10840

Sciascinoso is a variety of red grape from Campania in the south of Italy.

The clusters and berries are large. The cluster is slightly conical or cylindrical. It produces very colourful wines which are drunk within a year. It is usually blended with Piedirosso and Aglianico wines. About 440 hectares were under cultivation in 1999. Sciascinoso is used to make red Lacryma Christi wine.

== Ampelographic characteristics ==
The growing tip is open, fluffy, with a slightly reddish tinge. The whitish young leaves are also hairy. The medium to large leaves are lobed and strongly sinuate. The petiole sinus is U-shaped. The serrated blade is sharp. In autumn, the leaves change colour orange to deep red. The cone- or cylinder-shaped grape clusters are large. The oval berries are medium in size and the colour ranges from deep blue to violet.

The Sciascinoso ripens late, about 30 to 35 days after the Chasselas varietal.

== Synonyms ==
The Sciascinoso is also known as Avellinese, Cascolo, Cascolone, Foscopeloso, Livella, Livellone, Olivella, Olivella Bastarda, Olivella Bastardo, Olivellone, Sancinoso, Sancionosa, Sanginoso, Sangionoso, Sanguinosa, Sarcinosa, Sciascinoso, Sciascinuso, Sciasconoso, Strascinatolo, Strascinuso, Uva Di Avellino, Uva Di S. Severino, Uva Pane Rossa, and Uva Sanseverino.
