= Caprettone =

Variety of grape

Caprettone is a white Italian wine grape variety that is grown in the Campania region of southern Italy where it is a minor blending component in the Denominazione di Origine Controllata (DOC) wine of Lacryma Christi bianco. Caprettone is also grown in the Rogue River Valley of southern Oregon. Historically, the grape was believed to be a clone of the Campanian grape Coda di Volpe but DNA analysis has shown that the two grapes are instead distinct varieties.

== History ==
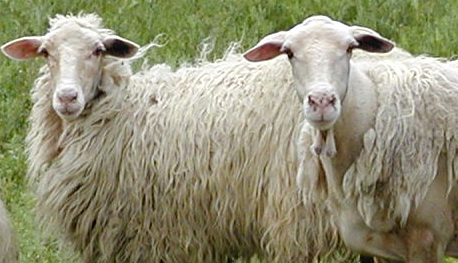
The name Caprettone may be derived from the Italian word for goat, capra.

Ampelographers believe that the name Caprettone may be derived from the Italian capra which means goat and could be a reference to the historical role of shepherds in grape growing in southern Italy or to the characteristic shape of Caprettone clusters which can resemble a goat's beard.

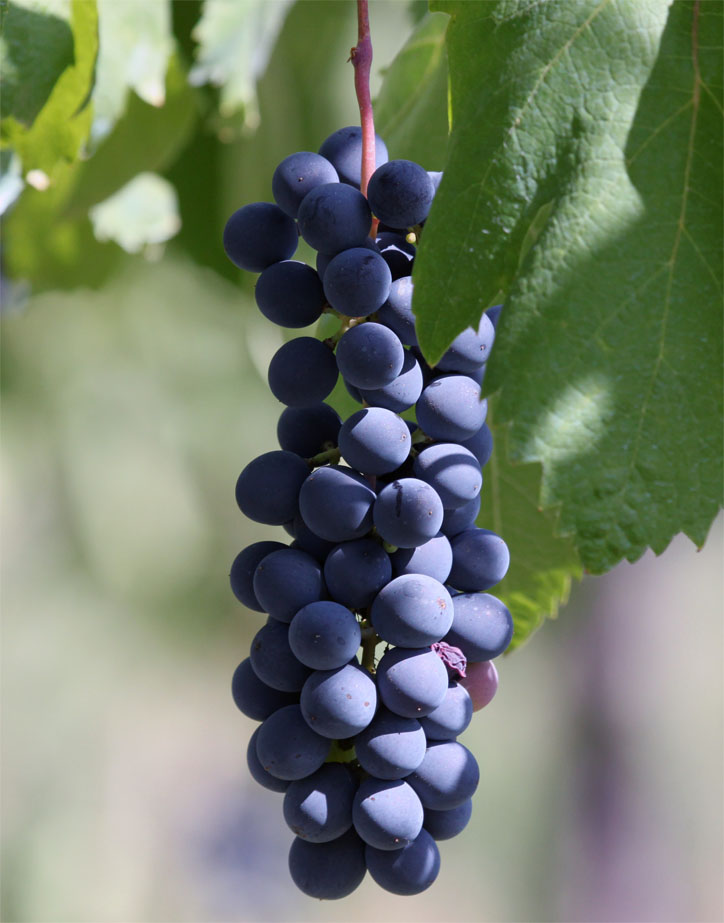
DNA analysis has revealed that Caprettone is closely related to the red Campanian grape Piedirosso (pictured).

For many years, Caprettone was assumed to be a clone of Coda di Volpe but DNA analysis in the early 21st century showed that the two grapes are distinct varieties and that, instead, Caprettone was closely related to the red Campanian wine grape Piedirosso and the white Ginestra. It was also speculated that Catalanesca and Uva Rosa may also be related to Caprettone but DNA results from 2005 showed no close relationship between those varieties and Caprettone.

== Viticulture ==
Caprettone is an early to mid-ripening grape variety that is usually harvested in Campania in mid to late September. The grape is noted for being able to maintain moderate acidity levels even in the warm climate of southern Italy.

== Wine regions ==
For the 2000 census, Caprettone was still officially recognized as a clone/synonym for Coda di Volpe, which had 1,027 hectares (2,540 acres) reported, so the exact number of plantings for the grape is not known. Ampelographers believe that true Caprettone is mostly isolated to the province of Napoli where 15 villages around Mount Vesuvius have had a long history of production with the grape.

Under DOC regulation, Caprettone can be made as a varietal wine under the Vesuvio DOC regulations, and it is permitted to be a major blending component in the white wine of Lacryma Christi del Vesuvio Bianco. In the Rogue River Valley appellation of Oregon in the U. S., a varietal wine is made from local Caprettone grapes.
