= Coda di Pecora =

Variety of grape

Coda di Pecora is a white Italian wine grape variety that is grown in the Campania region of southern Italy, particularly in the province of Caserta. The name Coda di Pecora means "goat's tail" in the local dialect and for many years was thought to be a clonal variation of another white Campanian variety, Coda di Volpe, whose name means "foxtail".

== History ==
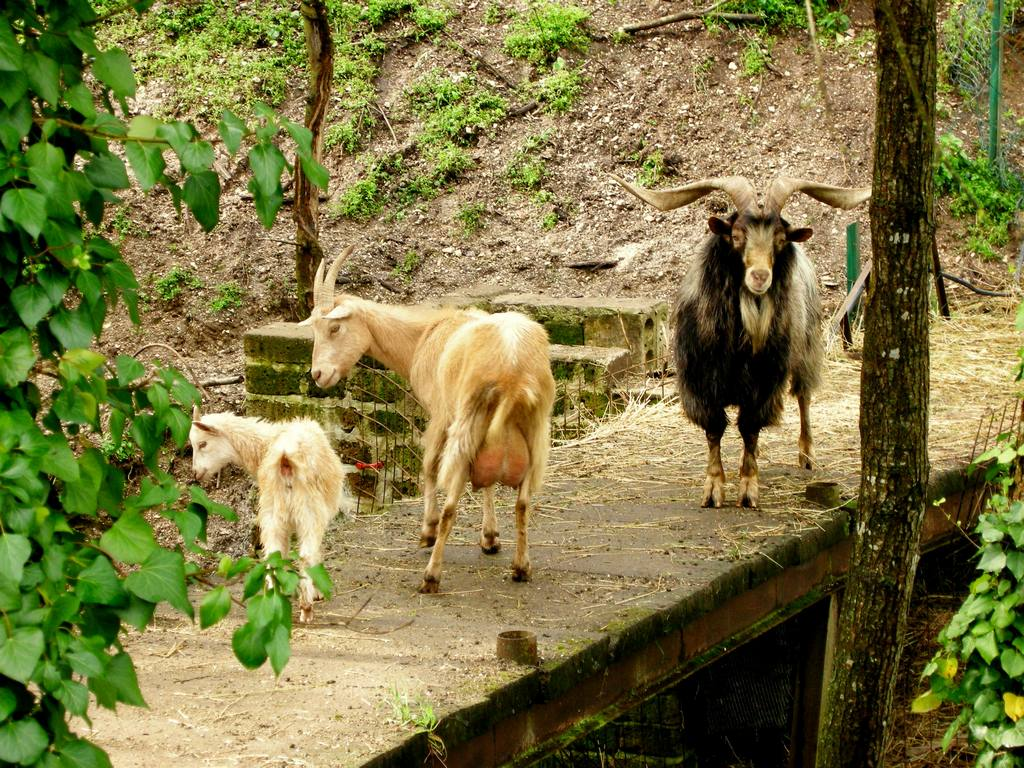
The name Coda di Pecora translates to "goat's tail" in the local Campanian dialect and is thought to be a reference to the characteristic shape of the grape's clusters.

Coda di Pecora has long been presumed to be a synonym or clonal variation of the white Campanian variety Coda di Volpe. While the name Coda di Volpe means "foxtail" in the local Campanian dialect, the name Coda di Pecora translates to "goat's tail" and is considered to be a reference to the characteristic shape of the grape's clusters. However, in 2005, DNA analysis showed that the two varieties were distinct and not closely related with Coda di Pecora potentially being related to another Campanian variety, San Pietro, that is also grown in the province of Caserta.

== Viticulture ==
The name Coda di Pecora (or "goat's tail") is thought to be derived from the characteristic shape of Coda di Pecora's clusters as they hang on the vine. The variety is known to be a reliable crop that tends to produce neutral flavored wines.

== Wine regions ==
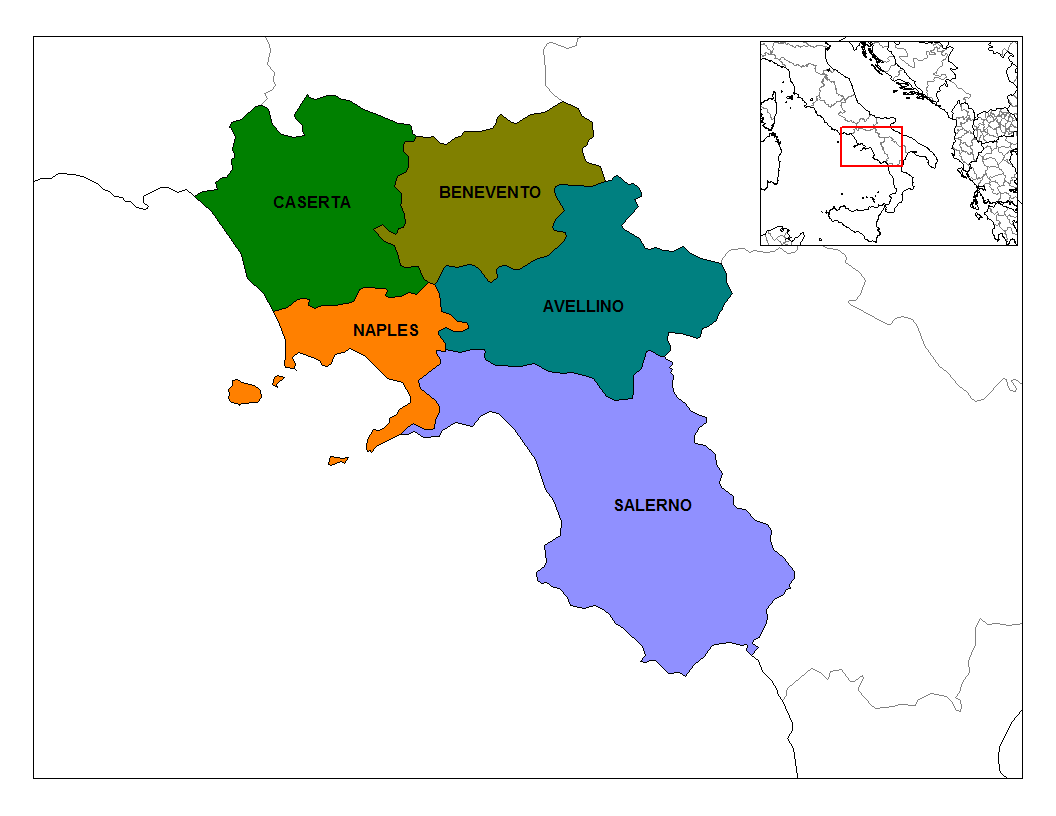
Most of the plantings of true Coda di Pecora are found in the province of Caserta in the northern region of Campania.

As the grape is still widely confused for Coda di Volpe, an exact count of plantings of Coda di Pecora is not known. However, ampelographers believe that of the 1,027 hectares (2,540 acres) of Coda di Volpe plantings reported in 2000 agricultural census, the majority of those found in province of Caserta around the extinct volcano of Roccamonfina are likely true Coda di Pecora. The communes of Conca della Campania, Galluccio, Mignano Monte Lungo and Tora e Piccilli also have a long tradition associated with Coda di Pecora plantings.

== Synonyms ==
For most of its history, Coda di Pecora was assumed to be a synonym of Coda di Volpe (also known as Guarnaccia). As of 2014, the Vitis International Variety Catalogue (VIVC) still only officially recognizes Coda di Pecora as a synonym and not as a distinct variety.
