= Aglianicone =

Variety of grape

Aglianicone is a red Italian wine grape variety that is grown in the Campania and Basilicata region of southern Italy. Despite the similarities in naming, Aglianicone is not a clonal mutation of Aglianico but DNA analysis does suggest a close genetic relationship between the two varieties.

The grape has a reputation of being a high yielding vine that produces wines of generally low quality. In 2000, there were 140 hectares (350 acres) of Aglianicone planted.

== History ==
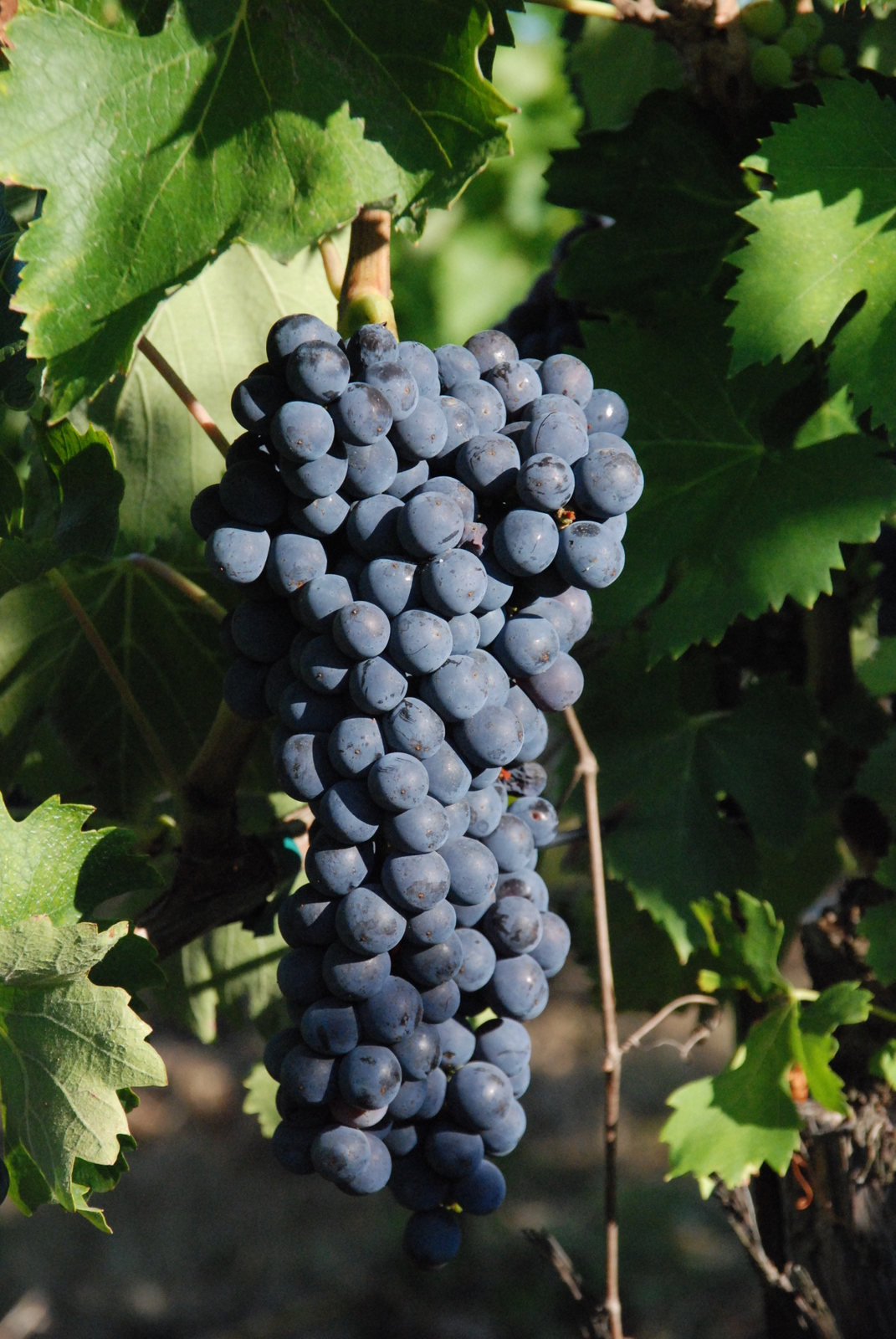
Ciliegiolo, which was once mistaken for Aglianicone.

At one point, the vine was thought to be identical to the Tuscan wine grape Ciliegiolo due to a false-positive result from DNA testing on mislabeled grapevines. After that error was uncovered, further DNA evidence revealed that even though Aglianicone was not a clonal mutation of Aglianico (as speculated due to the similarities in the name), the two grape vines are very closely related as potentially parent or offspring.

== Viticulture ==
Aglianicone is a very high-yielding grapevine that produces low quality fruit that is not officially authorized to be a primary component in any Denominazione di origine controllata (DOC) wine though limited amounts can be used as a minor blending component.

== Wine regions ==
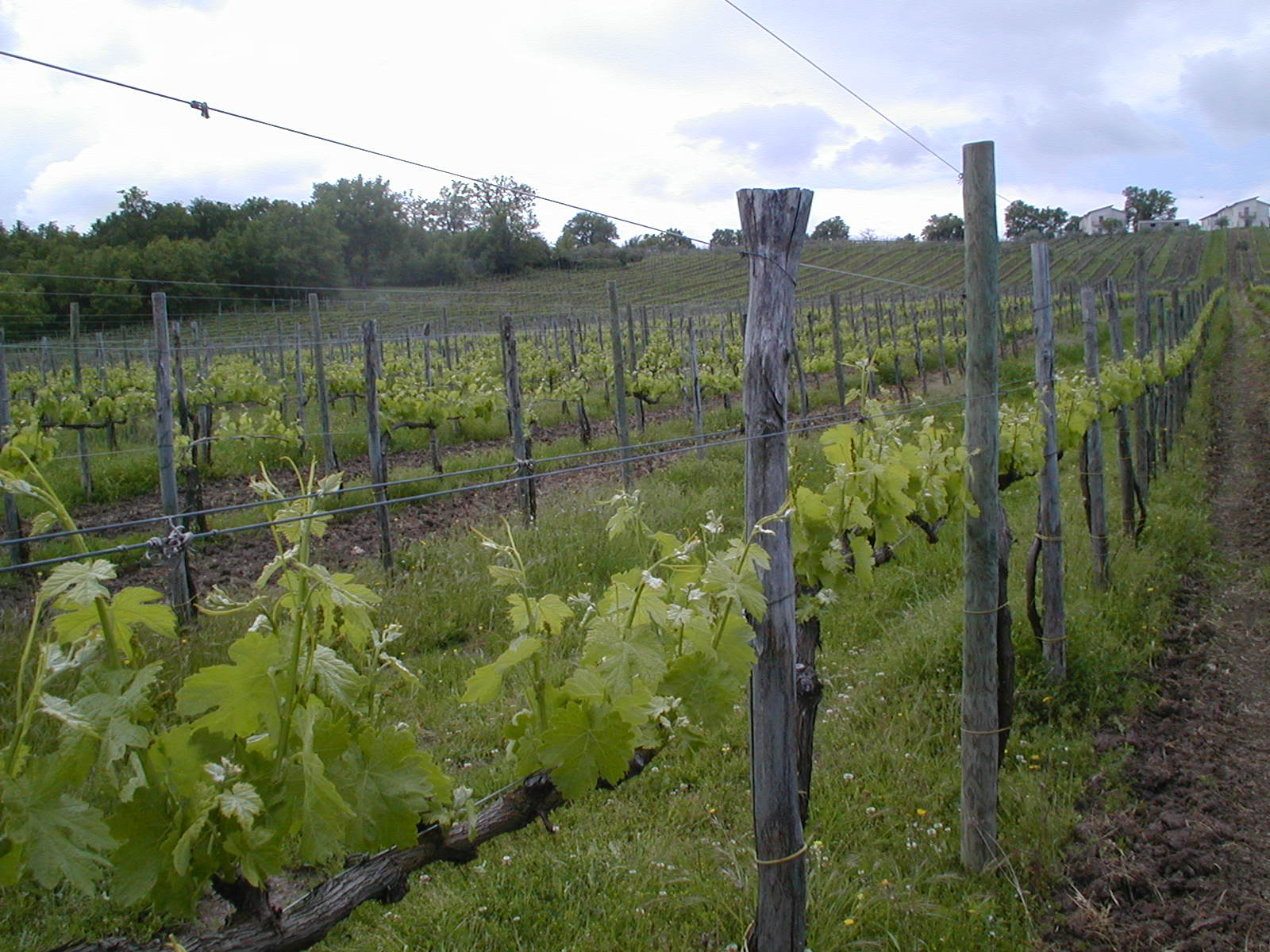
Vineyards in Campania where Aglianicone is still grown today.

In 2000, there 140 hectares (350 acres) of Aglianicone planted mostly in Campania and in the provinces of Matera and Potenza. Due to the grape's reputation for poor quality it is not currently permitted to make up a significant portion of any DOC wines.

== Synonyms ==
Over the years, Aglianicone has been known under a variety of synonyms including: Aglianico Bastardo, Aglianicone nero, Glianicone and Ruopolo.
