= Barbero =

Barbero is an Italian and Spanish surname. Notable people with the surname include:

- Aldo Barbero (1938–2013), Argentine actor
- Alessandro Barbero (born 1959), Italian historian
- Andrés Barbero (1877–1951), Paraguayan physician and philanthropist
- Carlos Barbero (born 1991), Spanish cyclist
- Gerardo Barbero (1961–2001), Argentine chess grandmaster
- Giuseppe Barbero (born 1927), Italian economist
- John Barbero (1945–2010), American public address announcer
- Lori Barbero (born 1961), American rock drummer

== See also ==
- Barbaro (disambiguation)
- Barbera (disambiguation)
- Barberi, a surname
