= Pallagrello nero =

Variety of grape

Pallagrello nero is a red Italian wine grape variety that is grown in Campania. The grape has a long history in the region and, like the similarly named Pallagrello bianco, was one of the varieties planted in 1775 by architect and engineer Luigi Vanvitelli in the fan-shaped Vigna del Ventaglio vineyard created for the royal palace of King Ferdinand I of the Two Sicilies (Ferdinand IV of Naples) in Caserta. Following the phylloxera epidemic of the mid-19th century and the economic devastation of the World Wars of the early 20th century, plantings of Pallagrello nero declined greatly and the variety was thought to be extinct until it was rediscovered growing in an abandoned Campanian vineyard in the 1990s.

Despite having similar names and both varieties originated in Campania, Pallagrello nero is not a color mutation of the white Campanian wine grape Pallagrello bianco though DNA profiling has not determined yet if the two varieties are closely related. Likewise, despite Pallagrello nero also being known under the synonym of Coda di Volpe nera, DNA analysis has ruled out a relationship with the white Campanian wine grape, Coda di Volpe, which, itself, is also known under the synonym Pallagrello and has similar looking "fox tail-shaped" grape clusters. There is some DNA evidence to suggest that Pallagrello nero maybe related to an old red Campania variety grown in the province of Caserta known as Casavecchia but the exact extent of that relationship is not yet known.

== History and name ==
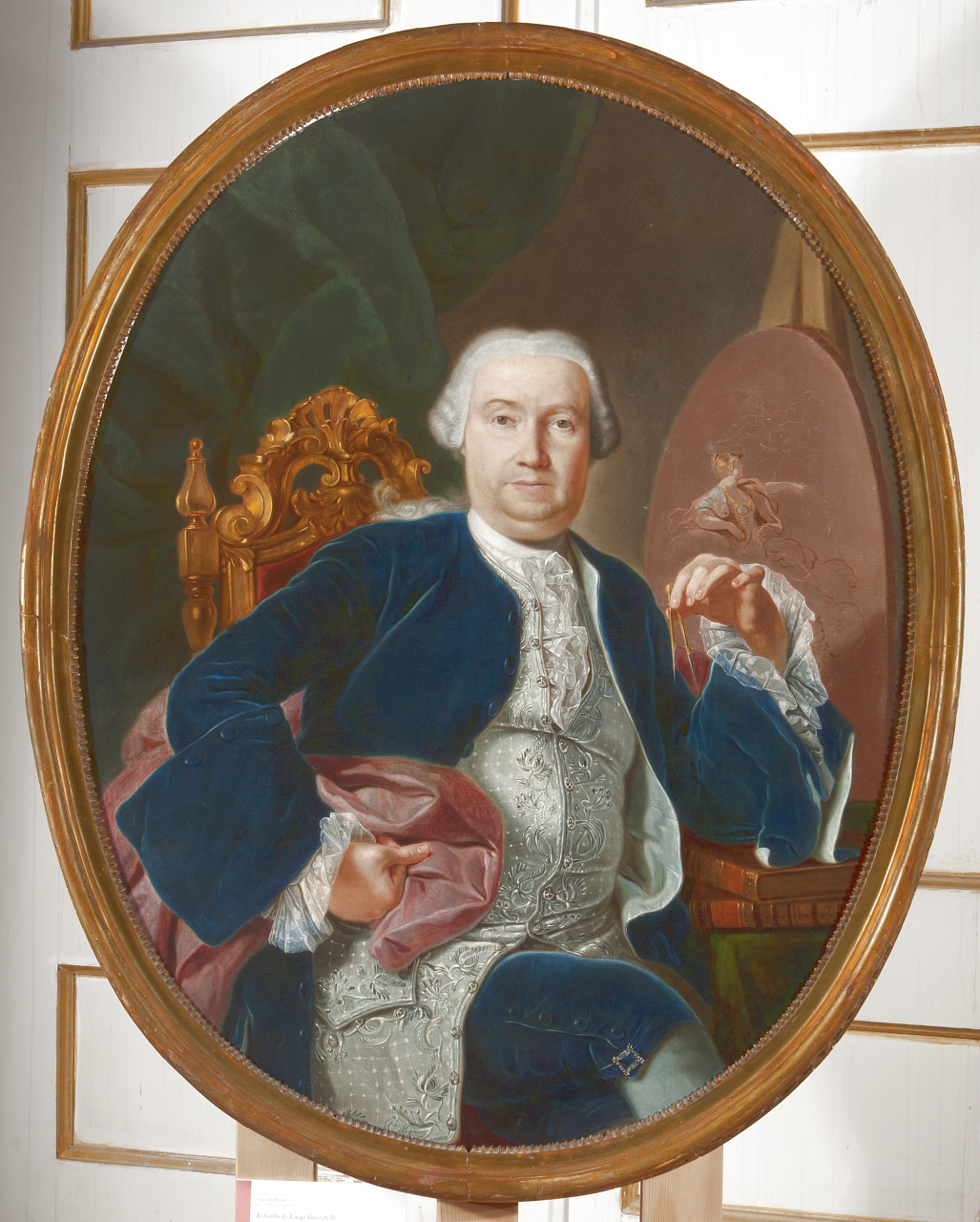
Pallagrello nero was one of the grape varieties included by architect Luigi Vanvitelli in his 1775 Vigna del Ventaglio vineyard for the royal palace at Caserta.

Ampelographers believe that Pallagrello nero is likely native to Campania and originated in what is now the province of Caserta. The name Pallagrello is likely derived from the Italian word pagliarello which refers to the straw mat that some grape varieties (such as Pallagrello bianco) were laid on after harvest to dry out before fermentation to produce straw wine.

The first written records of the grape date back to the late 18th century under the synonym Pallarelli. Under another old synonym, Piedmonte rosso, Pallagrello nero was one of the varieties included in the fan-shaped Vigna del Ventaglio vineyard created in 1775 by architect Luigi Vanvitelli for King Ferdinand's royal palace at Caserta. Planted on sloping terrain in the San Leucio frazione near the palace, the vineyard was planted in a semicircle design subdivided into 10 segments (or "fan blades") each planted to a different grape variety.

Like many Italian grape varieties, plantings of Pallagrello nero sharply declined in the decades following the phylloxera epidemic of the mid-19th century and the economic devastation of the World Wars of the early 20th century. The variety was thought to be extinct until it was rediscovered in 1990s, along with Pallagrello bianco, by a local winemaker growing in an abandoned Campanian vineyard.

== Viticulture and relationship to other grapes ==
Pallagrello nero is a mid to late ripening grape variety that has a natural tendency to be very low yielding. The grape has good resistance to many viticultural hazards including to botrytis bunch rot and contains a high natural content of phenolic compounds including anthocyanins which contribute to the color of wine.

Even though both varieties likely originated in the same part of Campania and the two grapes have historically been linked by synonyms and association, ampelographers have determined that Pallagrello nero is not a color mutation of Pallagrello bianco (in the same way that, for example, Pinot blanc is a color mutation of Pinot noir) though DNA profiling has yet to determine exactly how the two grapes may be related. Other DNA studies have instead suggested a relationship between Pallagrello nero and an old Campania variety, Casavecchia, that is native to the Caserta region

== Wine regions ==
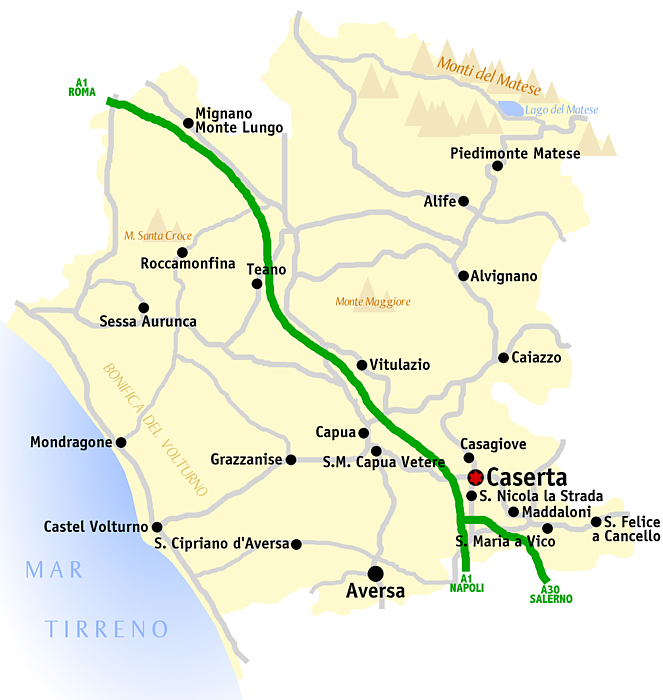
The province of Caserta

Today Pallagrello nero is grown almost exclusively in the Campania region, particularly in the province of Caserta where it has a long historical association with. The majority of the grapes plantings can be found around the communes of Alife, Alvignano, Caiazzo and Castel Campagnano. Outside of Caserta, some minor plantings can be found in the provinces of Avellino in Campania and Campobasso in Molise.

== Styles ==
Pallagrello nero is rarely seen as a varietal and is currently only permitted to be made as one under the Indicazione geografica tipica (IGT) designation of Campania. According to Master of Wine Jancis Robinson, those rare varietal examples tend to be dominated by peppery spice and cherry flavors with noticeable tannins that gives the wines some aging potential.

== Synonyms ==
Over the years, Pallagrello nero has been known under a variety of synonyms including: Coda di Volpe nera, Pallarelli, Pallagrella nera, Pallagrello, Piedilungo and Piedimonte rosso.
