= Barbera Sarda =

Variety of grape

Barbera Sarda is a red Italian wine grape variety that is grown on the island of Sardinia where it often used to add acidity to blends. Despite the similarities in their names, there is no known close genetic relationship between the Sardinian Barbera and the notable Piedmontese wine grape variety Barbera. Nor does there seem to be any close relationship with other grapes names Barbera, such as Barbera bianca and Barbera del Sannio.

== History ==
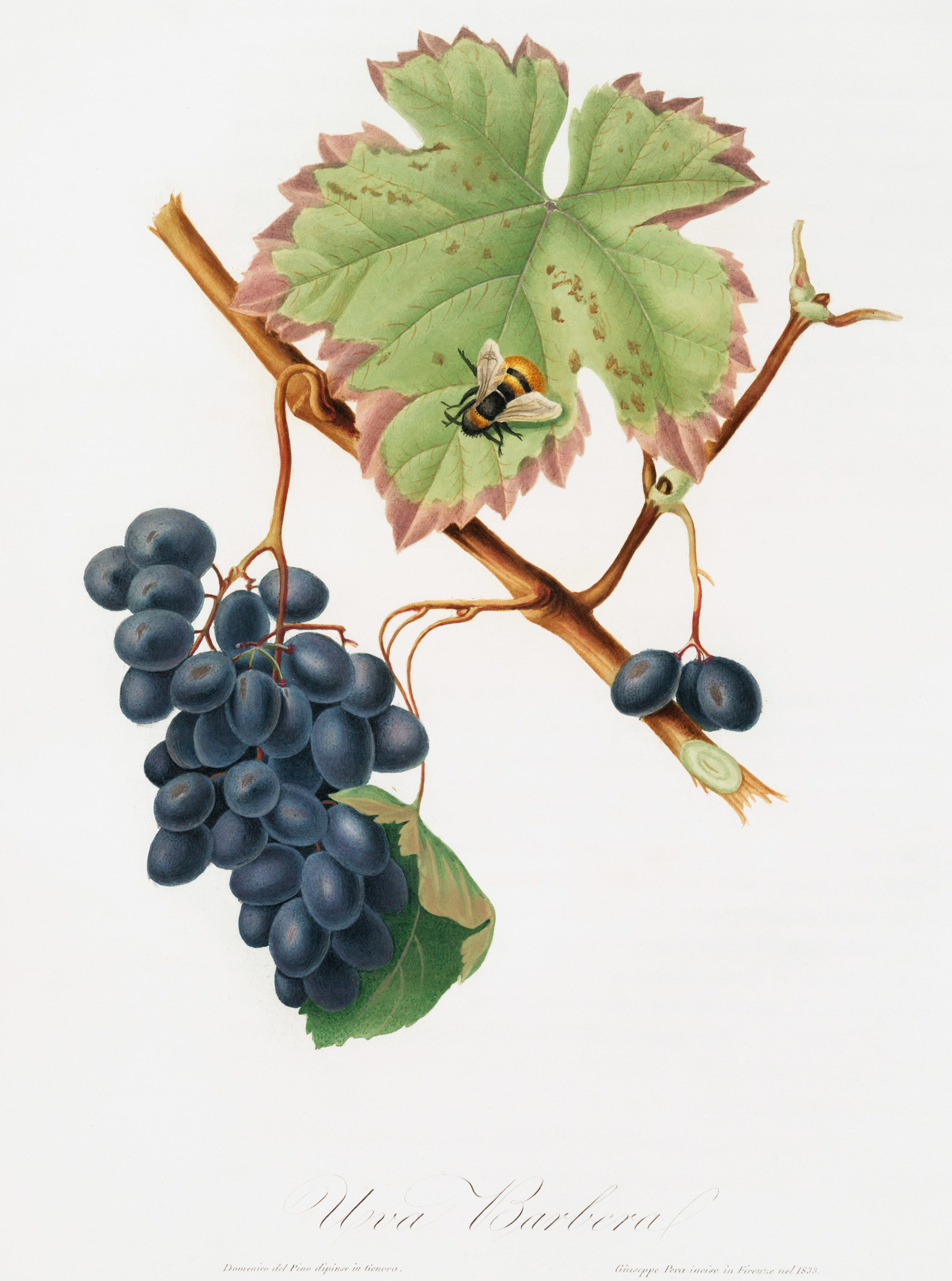
For most of its history, Barbera Sarda was thought to be a local clone of the Piedmont wine grape Barbera (pictured).

Until the late 20th and early 21st century, Barbera Sarda was thought by wine growers to be a local clone of the Piedmont wine grape Barbera with some ampelographers suggesting that it could also be related to Carignan, known in parts of Italy as Mazuelo. However, DNA analysis has shown that Barbera Sarda is a distinct variety with no close genetic relationship with either grapes or to any of the many other grapes that are various known as Barbera. Some ampelographers still believe that the grape could potentially be an offspring of the Piedmontese Barbera even though, as of 2012, there has been no DNA evidence to support that theory.

== Viticulture ==
Barbera Sarda is a late ripening grape variety that maintains high levels of acidity even when it is harvested late in the growing season.

== Wine regions ==
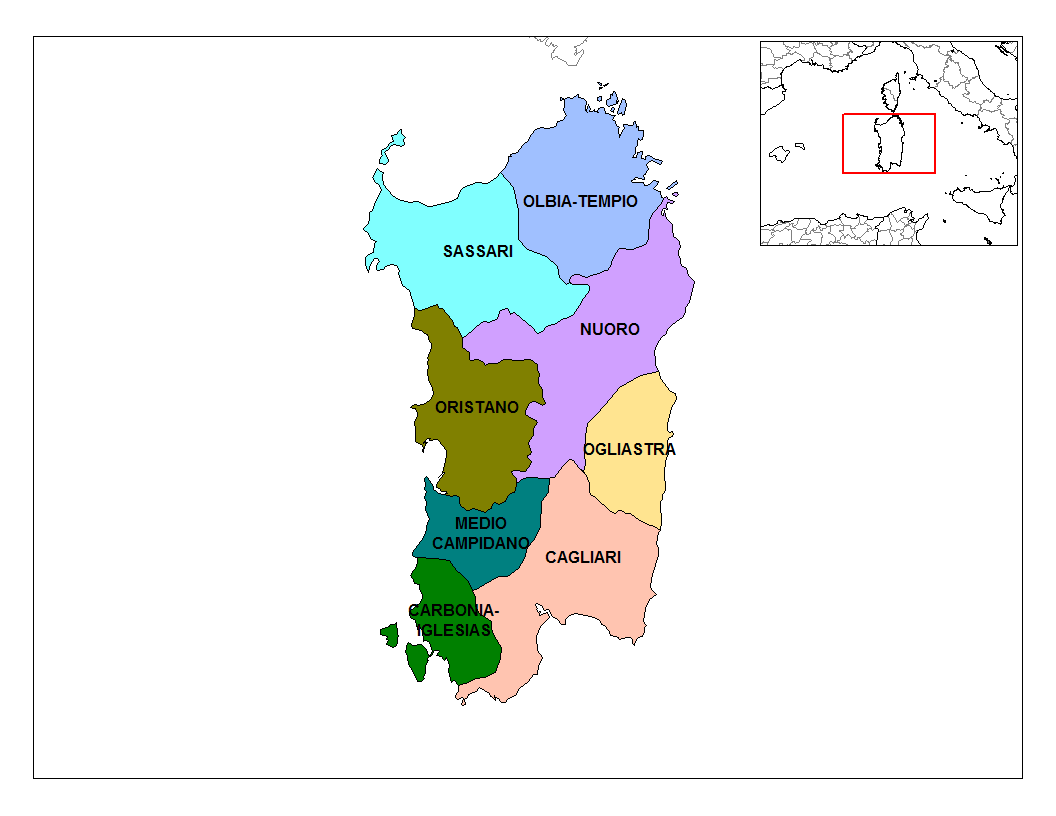
Barbera Sarda is a recommended grape variety in several Sardinian provinces.

Today, Barbera Sarda is found almost exclusively on the island of Sardinia where it is a recommended grape variety for wine production in the provinces of Cagliari, Nuoro, Oristano and Sassari. While the grape can be made as a varietal, it is most often used in blends where the grapes naturally high acidity can add balance to the wines.

== Synonyms ==
As of 2014, the Vitis International Variety Catalogue (VIVC) does not recognize any official synonyms for Barbera Sarda.
