= Barberini (disambiguation) =

Barberini may refer to:

- Apollo Barberini, a 1st–2nd-century Roman sculpture
- Barberini family, a family of the Italian nobility
- Barberini Faun, a marble statue in Germany
- Barberini – Fontana di Trevi, an underground station of the Rome Metro
- Museum Barberini, a museum in Germany
- Palazzo Barberini, a 17th-century palace in Rome
- Piazza Barberini, a square of Rome, Italy
