= Barbera bianca =

Italian wine grape variety

- Grape (Vitis)
- Color of berry skin: White
- Species: Vitis vinifera
- Also called: (more)
- Origin: Italy
- Notable regions: Piedmont
- VIVC number: 974

Barbera bianca is a white Italian wine grape variety that is grown in the Piedmont wine region of northwest Italy. Despite being named Barbera bianca, the grape is not a color mutation of the red Piedmontese wine grape Barbera that is the third most widely planted grape variety in Italy. In fact, DNA analysis conducted in the early 21st century shows no genetic relationship at all between the two grape varieties.

Barbera bianca is noted for its high acidity levels, the vast majority of it tartaric rather than malic acid. This propensity for high acid lends the grape well to sparkling wine production. Barbera bianca is a permitted grape variety in the Denominazione di origine controllata (DOC) wines of Colli Tortonesi produced in the province of Alessandria.

== History ==
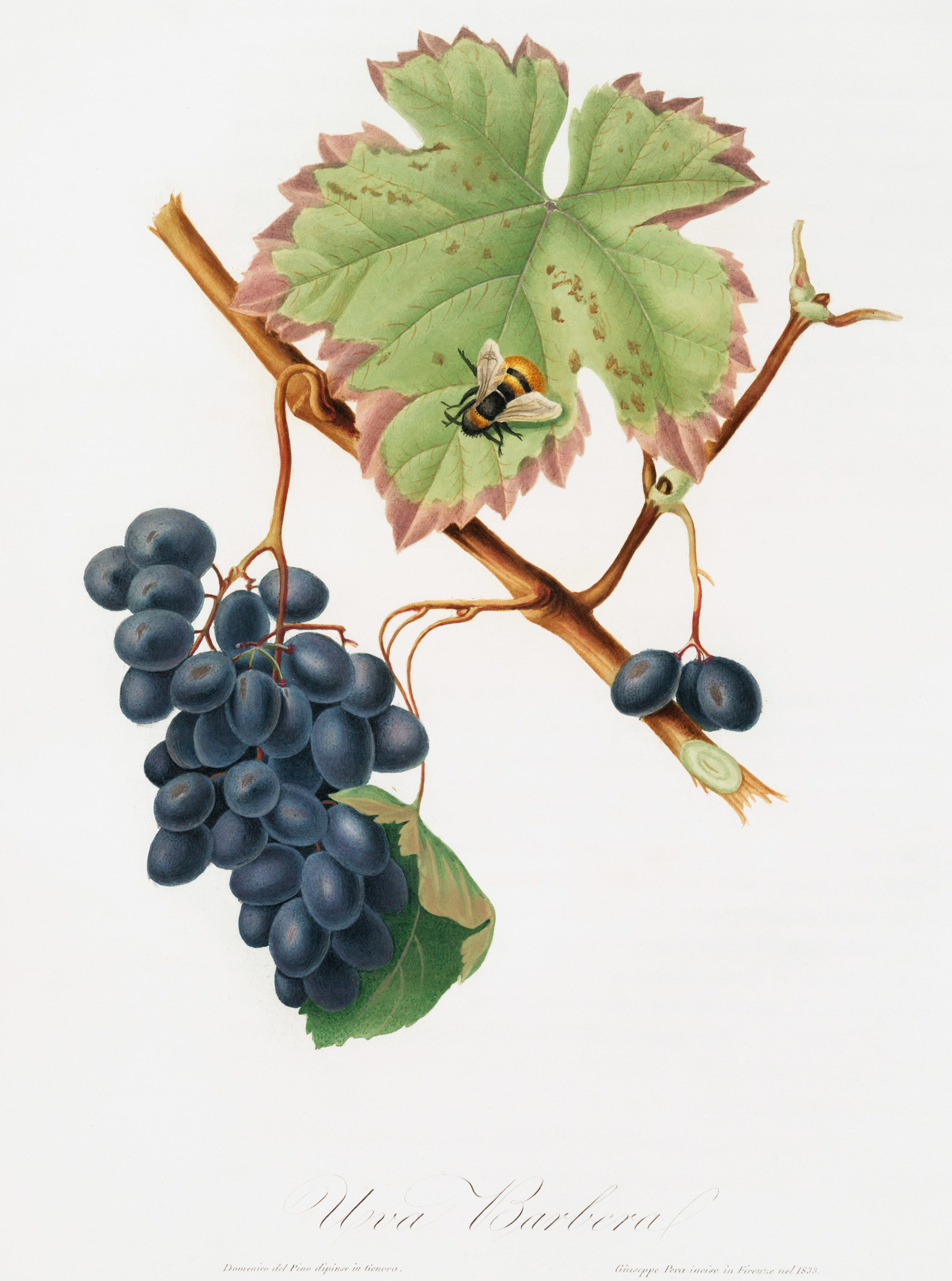
Barbera bianca is believed to have gotten its name due to the similarities in the size and shape of its grape clusters with the red Piedmont wine grape Barbera (pictured).

The exact origins of Barbera bianca are not yet known but the grape has been growing in the Piedmont region of Italy since at least the early 19th century when it was described in an 1825 document. Ampelographers believe that the grape got its name due to morphological similarities with Barbera, particularly the size and shape of the berries and grape clusters of both vines. However, DNA profiling in the early 21st century showed that the two grapes are distinct varieties with no known genetic relationship between them.

== Viticulture ==
Barbera bianca is a mid-ripening grape variety that is prone to producing high yields if not kept in check with winter pruning and late season green harvesting. Even at full ripeness, the grapes have very high levels of tartaric acid.

== Wine regions ==
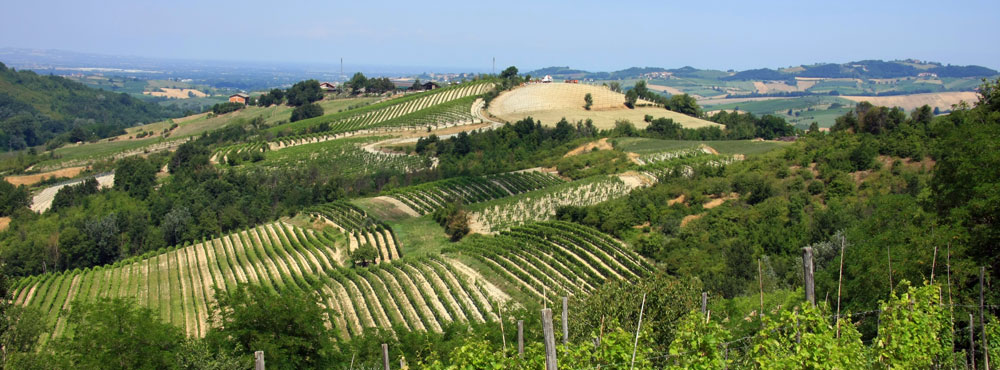
The Colli Tortonesi wine region in the province of Alessandria.

In 2000, there were 280 hectares (690 acres) of Barbera bianca planted in Italy, nearly all of it in the province of Alessandria. It is most commonly found in older vineyards around the communes of Acqui Terme and Alessandria. Here the grape is often blended with other white wine grape varieties such as Cortese, Muscat Blanc à Petits Grains, Timorasso and Vermentino which can help temper Barbera bianca's high acid levels. Some winemakers utilize the grape's acidity for the production of light-bodied sparkling wines. It is a permitted variety in the white wines of the Colli Tortonesi DOC.

== Relationship to other grapes ==
Unlike the relationship between Pinot blanc and Grenache blanc with Pinot noir and Grenache, respectively, Barbera bianca is not a color mutation of Barbera and, in fact, has no known genetic relationship with Piedmontese grape. Despite sharing several synonyms, Barbera bianca also has no known relation with Carica l'Asino, another Piedmontese grape that likely originated in the Liguria wine region and is sometimes blended with Barbera bianca. Likewise, the red Campanian grape Barbera del Sannio that is used in the Sannio DOC and the Sardinian wine grape Barbera Sarda are also unrelated to Barbera bianca.

== Synonyms ==
Over the years Barbera bianca has been known under a variety of synonyms including: Bertolino, Bertoulin, Caria l'Aso, Lardera, Lardera bianca, Lardera delle Langhe, Martinella, Martinetta, Ovata bianca, Peigein, Peigin, Peisìn, Peisin, Poison bianco, Poisino and Uva Ovata.
