= Giuseppe Barbero =

Italian economist and sociologist

Giuseppe Barbero (born 20 April 1927) is an Italian economist and sociologist, specialized in the agricultural sector.

Born in Dronero, Barbero graduated with a degree in agricultural sciences in 1949 from the University of Turin. He pursued graduate study in agricultural economics from the University of California, Berkeley (USA) in 1952.

Professor emeritus of economic sociology at the Sapienza University of Rome he was formerly also professor at the University of Siena (1966-1977) and president of the Italian National Institute for Agricultural Economics (INEA) from January 1976 to February 1991.

He has worked, among others, for FAO, mainly in Latin America, and is one of the founders of the European Review of Agricultural Economics and first president of the European Association of Agricultural Economists (1973-1993).

His career and fields of interest can be divided into four periods:

- In the first period – from 1952 to the early 1960s – his research work was mainly centred on the analysis of the impact of agrarian reform and public investments for the expansion of irrigation facilities in Southern Italy. These activities were carried out at first in the Agricultural Economics Institute of the Faculty of Agricultural Sciences in Portici (Naples). Later he moved to Rome, to design first and then direct the joint FAO/INEA study on land reform
- In the second period – from 1964 to 1976 – his dominant interests focused on the critical steps and overall consequences of the formation of the Common Agricultural Policy (CAP), and the need for institutional innovations in agricultural planning at the regional and sub-regional level.
- In the third period – 1976 to 1990 – his intellectual engagements were to a great extent directed towards INEA, the Italian Institute for Agricultural Economics, strengthening its contacts and cooperation with other Italian and European research institutions
- In the fourth period – 1991 until now – his attention turned to new subjects and challenges, from the changing role of agriculture and rural areas to the incoming effects of globalization.

In summary, his research interests cover a number of important issues: economic development (economics of irrigation, land reform, productivity), the construction of the European Community/Union, conflicts in international trade, world food problems, the effects of globalization on European agriculture, rural development issues and land uses. In his long career as an expert in the fields of agricultural policy, he has participated actively in international debate, mostly with regard to the structural reforms that would boost the social economic transformation of rural Europe after the second world war.

He contributed to underlining the connections between agricultural economics, land planning, social sciences and history.

== Major works ==
- Riforma agraria italiana: risultati e prospettive, Feltrinelli, Milano, 1960
- Realizaciones y problemas de la reforma agraria en Bolivia, El Trimestre Economico, vol. XXVIII, Messico, ottobre-dicembre, 1961
- Tendenze nell'evoluzione della strutture delle aziende agricole italiane, INEA, Roma, 1967
- Agriculture's Contribution To Economic Development: The Italian Experience. Published in Weitz R. (Editor), Rural Development in a Changing World, MIT Press, Cambridge, 1971
- Agricultural Mechanization and Employment in Southern Italy, International Labour Review, N. 5., November, 1972, pp. 455–487
- Produttività e progresso tecnico nell'agricoltura italiana, in Rivista di Economia Agraria, Anno XXIX, n.1, 1974, pp. 55–95
- Agricultural Development and Regional Economic Integration, International Conference of Agricultural Economists, Nairobi, Kenya, 1976. Published in Dams T., Hunt, K. (editors), Decision making and Agriculture, Oxford Agricultural Economics Institute, 1977
- Quante sono le aziende agricole italiane?, in Rivista di Economia Agraria, n. 2, 1982
- Gli alimenti, in Gallino L. and Castronovo V., (Editor), La società contemporanea, vol. I, UTET, Torino, 1987, ISBN 88-02-04078-8
- Il mercato del lavoro agricolo negli anni Ottanta: struttura e aspetti emergenti (with Marotta G.), Istituto nazionale di economia agraria, Roma, Il Mulino, Bologna, 1987, ISBN 88-15-01457-8
- Farming, Landscape, Culture: Fruition Forms and Tourism, in Nocifora E. (Editor), Turismo mediterraneo, SEAM, Roma, 1993, ISBN 88-86088-13-2
- Public Policy for the Promotion of Family Farms in Italy: The Experience of the Fund for the Formation of Peasant Property (with Shearer E.B., The World Bank, Washington, 1994, ISBN 0821330268
- Alcune interpretazioni della crisi del welfare state, in Bartocci E. (Editor), Le incerte prospettive dello stato sociale, Donzelli, Roma, 1996, ISBN 88-7989-311-4
- The Likely Effects of Globalization on the Future of European Agriculture, in Ferro O. (Editor), What future for the CAP?, Wissenschaftsverlag, Kiel, 1997
- La Costituzione del 1948 e la politica agraria italiana negli anni Cinquanta e Sessanta, in QA Rivista dell'Associazione Rossi-Doria, n. 1, 2010, pp. 37–64
- Non tutto è da buttare via. Territorio, riforme, politica, with Simone Misiani (Editor) and Ronald Dore (Afterword), Associazione Alessandro Bartola, Ancona, 2015, ISBN 9788894062908
