= Antonio Barberi =

Italian engraver

Antonio Barberi (fl. 18th century) was an Italian engraver. He published a print of Plattemontagne's canvas formerly in the cathedral of Notre-Dame de Paris and now in the Louvre depicting Saints Paul and Silas liberated from prison, and also a large-scale map of the 14 rioni of Rome.
