= Pallagrello bianco =

Variety of grape

Pallagrello bianco is a white Italian wine grape variety that is grown in Campania. The grape has a long history in the region and was one of the varieties planted in 1775 by architect and engineer Luigi Vanvitelli in the fan-shaped Vigna del Ventaglio vineyard created for the royal palace of King Ferdinand I of the Two Sicilies (Ferdinand IV of Naples) in Caserta. Following the phylloxera epidemic of the mid-19th century and the economic devastation of the World Wars of the early 20th century, plantings of Pallagrello bianco declined greatly and the variety was thought to be extinct until it was rediscovered growing in an abandoned Campanian vineyard in the 1990s.

Despite having similar names and both varieties originated in Campania, Pallagrello bianco is not a color mutation of the red Campanian wine grape Pallagrello nero though DNA profiling has not determined yet if the two varieties are closely related. DNA analysis has ruled out a relationship with another white Campanian wine grape, Coda di Volpe, which is known under the synonym Pallagrello and has similar looking "fox tail-shaped" grape clusters.

== History and name ==
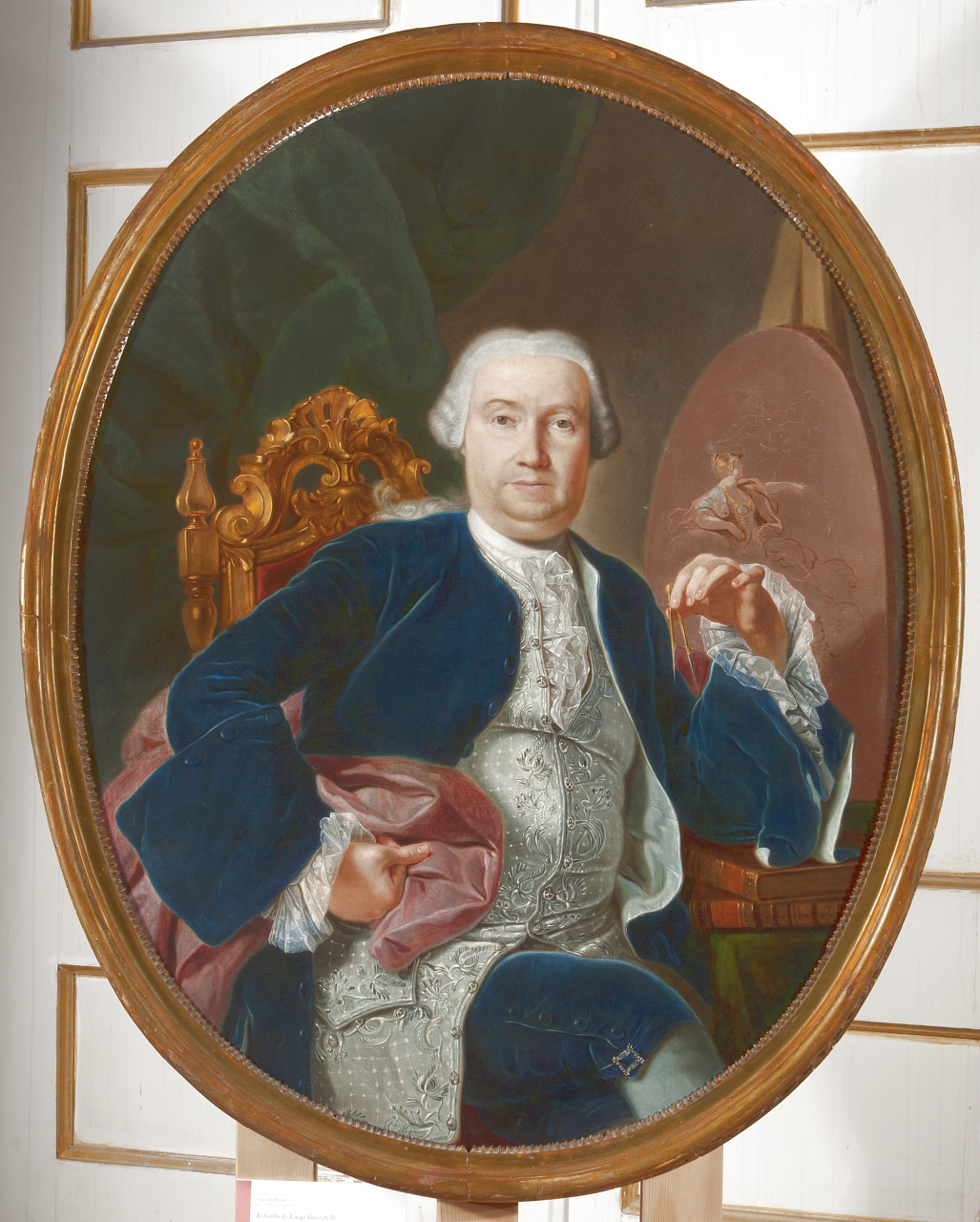
Pallagrello bianco was one of the grape varieties included by architect Luigi Vanvitelli in his 1775 Vigna del Ventaglio vineyard for the royal palace at Caserta.

Ampelographers believe that Pallagrello bianco is likely native to Campania and originated in what is now the province of Caserta somewhere between the communes of Piedimonte Matese and Alife. The grape was traditionally made as a straw wine with the name Pallagrello being derived from the Italian word pagliarello which refers to the straw mat that Pallagrello bianco were laid on after harvest to dry out before fermentation.

The first written records of the grape date back to the late 18th century under the synonym Pallarelli. Under another old synonym, Piedmonte bianco, Pallagrello bianco was one of the varieties included in the fan-shaped Vigna del Ventaglio vineyard created in 1775 by architect Luigi Vanvitelli for King Ferdinand's royal palace at Caserta. Planted on sloping terrain in the San Leucio frazione near the palace, the vineyard was planted in a semicircle design subdivided into 10 segments (or "fan blades") each planted to a different grape variety.

Like many Italian grape varieties, plantings of Pallagrello bianco sharply declined in the decades following the phylloxera epidemic of the mid-19th century and the economic devastation of the World Wars of the early 20th century. The variety was thought to be extinct until it was rediscovered in 1990s, along with Pallagrello nero, by a local winemaker growing in an abandoned Campanian vineyard.

== Viticulture and relationship to other grapes ==
Pallagrello bianco is a mid to late ripening grape variety that has a natural tendency to be very low yielding. The grape has good resistance to many viticultural hazards including to botrytis bunch rot which lent itself well to the production of late harvest wines.

Clusters of Pallagrello bianco tend to resemble the bush tail of a fox, larger at the top and tapering down to a point. This is a trait shared by another Campanian wine grape, Coda di Volpe, whose name means literally "fox tail". At one point the two grapes were thought to be the same variety but DNA analysis in the early 21st century conclusively demonstrated that the two varieties are distinct and unrelated. DNA evidence was also able to distinguish Pallagrello bianco from the Emilia-Romagna grape Pignoletto (which is often confused, itself, for the Orvieto wine grape Grechetto). Pignoletto is grown in Campania under the synonym Pallagrello di Caserta but has no known relationship to Pallagrello bianco.

Even though both varieties likely originated in the same part of Campania and the two grapes have historically been linked by synonyms and association, ampelographers have determined that Pallagrello bianco is not a color mutation of Pallagrello nero (in the same way that, for example, Pinot blanc is a color mutation of Pinot noir) though DNA profiling has yet to determine exactly how the two grapes may be related.

== Wine regions ==
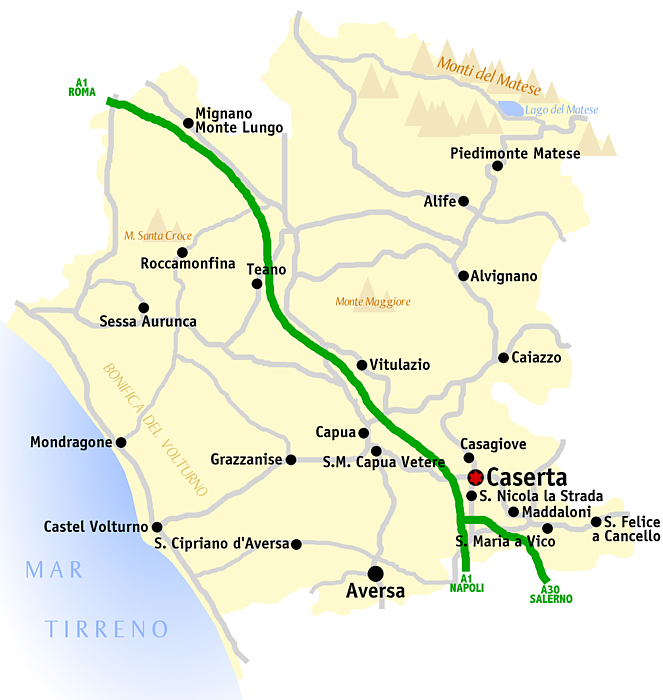
While Pallagrello bianco is thought to have originated somewhere between the communes of Piedimonte Matese and Alife in the north eastern reaches of the province of Caserta, today plantings of the grapes are more likely to be found further south in the province around communes like Caiazzo.

Today Pallagrello bianco is grown almost exclusively in the Campania region, particularly in the province of Caserta where it has a long historical association with. While plantings of the grape have only recent been revived, some hectares of Pallagrello bianco can be found in a few communes along the Volturno river, Caiazzo, Castel Campagnano and Castel di Sasso.

== Styles ==
According to Master of Wine Jancis Robinson, Pallagrello bianco tends to make wines with a similar profile to the Rhône wine grape Viognier with aroma notes of peaches and apricot along with moderate acidity and high potential alcohol levels. While often blended the grape can be made in a varietal style that is produced both in unoaked or stainless steel tanks of barrel fermented like Chardonnay.

== Synonyms ==
Over the years, Pallagrello bianco has been known under a variety of synonyms including: Pallarelli, Pallagrella bianca, Pallagrello di Avellino, Pallarella and Piedimonte bianco.
