= Barbaro (surname) =

Barbaro is an Italian surname. Notable people with the surname include:

- Antonio Barbaro (died 1679), Venetian naval commander
- Carmelo Barbaro (born 1948), member of the Barbaro 'ndrina
- Daniele Barbaro (1514–1570), Patriarch of Aquileia
- Ermolao Barbaro (c. 1410 – 1471), bishop of Treviso and Verona
- Ermolao Barbaro (1454–1493), Patriarch of Aquileia
- Federico Barbaro (1913–1996), Italian missionary in Japan
- Francesco Barbaro (1390–1454), 15th-century Venetian politician
- Francesco Barbaro (1927–2018), American head of the Barbaro 'ndrina
- Francesco Barbaro (Patriarch of Aquileia)
- Giosafat Barbaro, fifteenth century author and explorer
- Gary Barbaro (born 1954), former National Football League player
- Giuseppe Barbaro (born 1956), Italian Mafia boss
- Jacopo Barbaro, alternate spelling of Jacopo de' Barbari's surname
- Joe Barbaro, a character in the video game Mafia II
- Lou Barbaro (1916–1976), professional golfer
- Marcantonio Barbaro, 16th-century Venetian politician
- Marco Barbaro, 16th-century genealogist
- Michael Barbaro (born 1979), American journalist
- Monica Barbaro (born 1990), American actress
- Nick Barbaro (born 1952), American journalist and businessman, co-founder of The Austin Chronicle
- Umberto Barbaro (1902–1959), Italian film director and screenwriter
