= Aglianico =

Variety of grape

- Grape (Vitis)
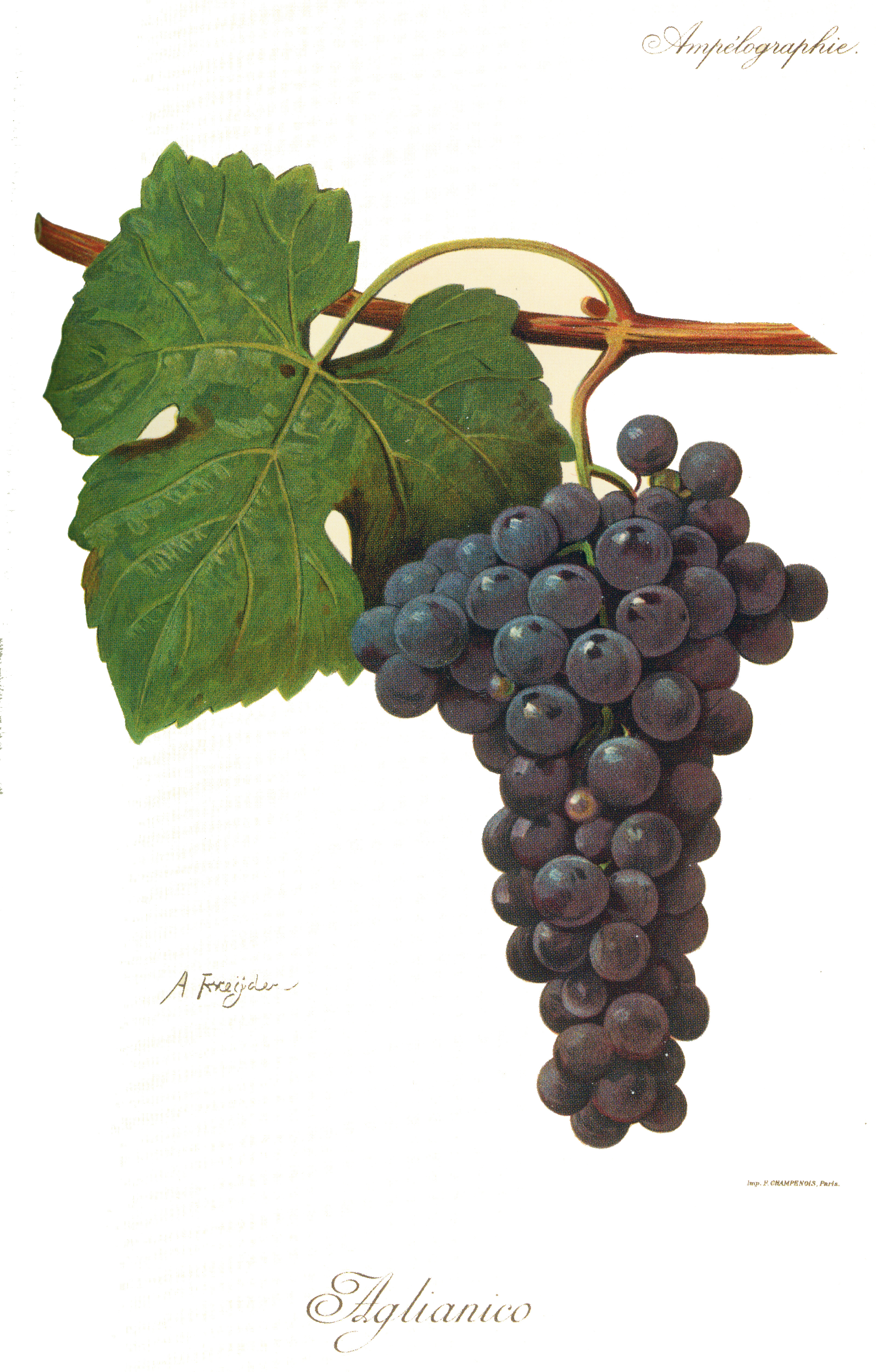
- Illustration of Aglianico grape
- Color of berry skin: Black
- Species: Vitis vinifera
- Also called: Gnanico, Agliatica, Ellenico, Ellanico, Uva Nera and "Southern Barolo"
- Origin: Italy
- Notable wines: Aglianico del Vulture, Taurasi
- Hazards: Peronospora
- VIVC number: 121

Aglianico (English: /ælˈjænɪkoʊ/ al-YAN-ik-oh, Italian: [aʎˈʎaːniko]) is a black grape grown in the southern regions of Italy, mostly Basilicata and Campania. It is considered with Sangiovese and Nebbiolo to be one of the three greatest Italian varieties. Aglianico is sometimes called "The Barolo of the South" (il Barolo del Sud) due to its ability to produce highly refined, complex fine wines like the famous wine from Piedmont, Barolo.

== History ==
The origins of both the vine itself and its name are unclear. Traditionally, the vine is thought to have originated in Greece, first cultivated by Phocians from an unidentified ancestral vine; it was then brought to Cumae, near modern-day Pozzuoli, by Greek settlers in the 8th century BC, and from there it spread into southern Italy. However, modern DNA analysis of Aglianico does not support this view, revealing little relation to other Greek grape varieties. Its parentage also remains unknown, implying that it is likely to be endemic to its region. If Aglianico was imported to Italy from Greece, no original Greek plantings have persisted.

The name first appeared in print as the feminine plural Aglianiche in 1520, and several etymological theories persist. The name may be a corruption of vitis hellenica (Latin for 'Greek vine'), or of Apulianicum, the Latin name for the whole of southern Italy in the time of ancient Rome. However, since there is also no record of the name Aglianico prior to the 15th century Spanish conquest of southern Italy, another possible origin of the name is from llano (Spanish for 'plain') denoting a grape grown on the plains.

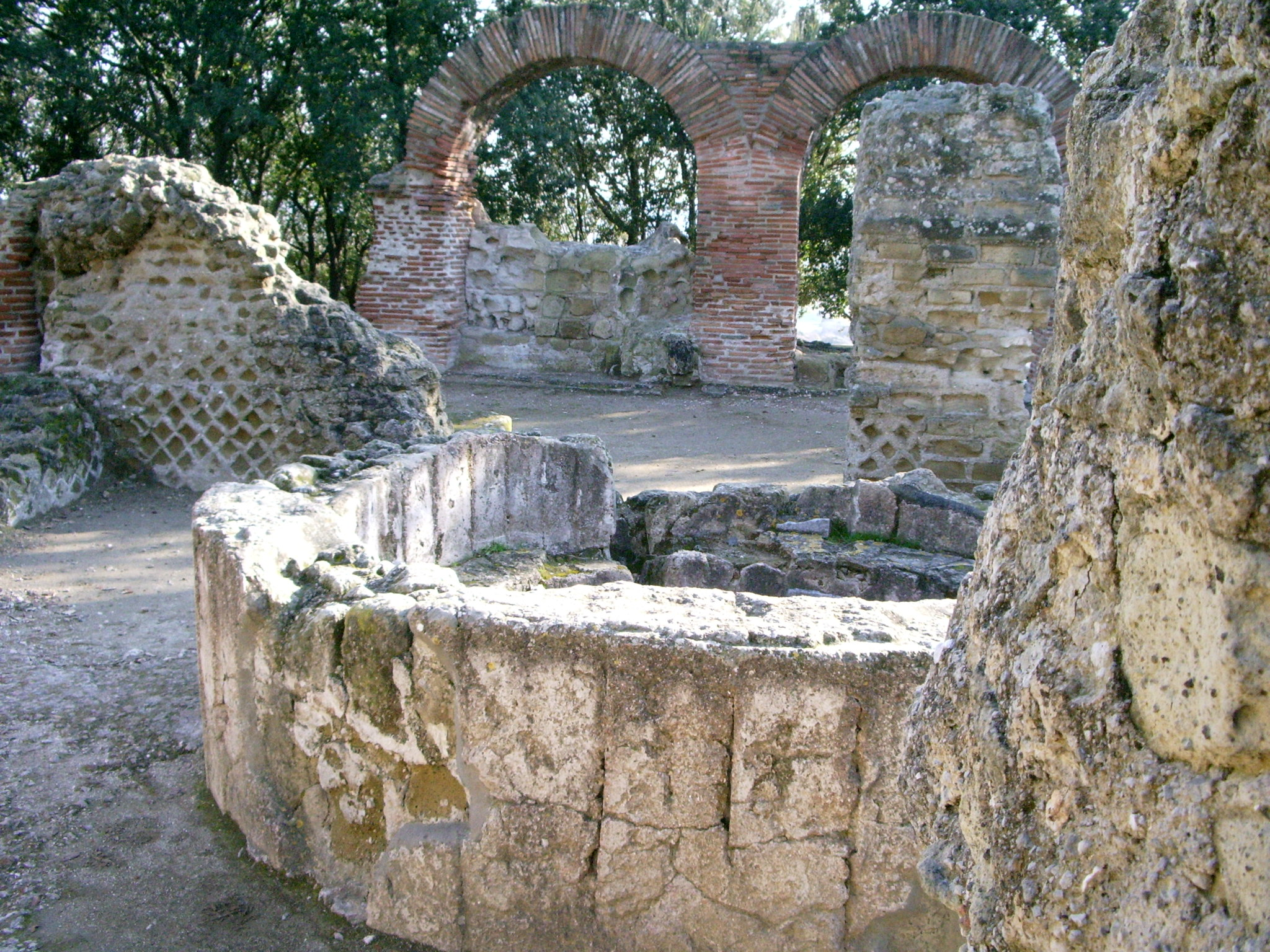
Ruins from the Greek settlement of Cumae.

Oenologist Denis Dubourdieu has said, "Aglianico is probably the grape with the longest consumer history of all", claiming that Aglianico was used to make the Falernian wine famed during Roman times. Along with the white grape Greco (used to make the famous Greco di Tufo wine), the red grape of the region was regarded favourably by Pliny the Elder. Traces of the vine have been found in Molise, Apulia, and also on the island of Procida near Naples, although it is no longer widely cultivated in those places.

== Relationship to other grapes ==
Despite the similarities in naming, the Campanian wine grape Aglianicone is not a clonal mutation of Aglianico but DNA analysis does suggest a close genetic relationship between the two varieties.

== Wine regions ==
In Basilicata, Aglianico is the basis of the Aglianico del Vulture DOC and the region's only DOCG wine, Aglianico del Vulture Superiore, concentrated in the northern area of the province of Potenza. The most sought-after productions come from the vineyards located in and around the extinct volcano Mount Vulture.

In Campania, the area in and around the village of Taurasi in the Province of Avellino and the area around the Monte del Taburno in the Province of Benevento produce Aglianico wines bearing the DOCG designation. Taurasi was designated DOCG in 1993, and Aglianico del Taburno in 2011. More Aglianico can be found in the province of Caserta, as the principal grape of Falerno del Massico.

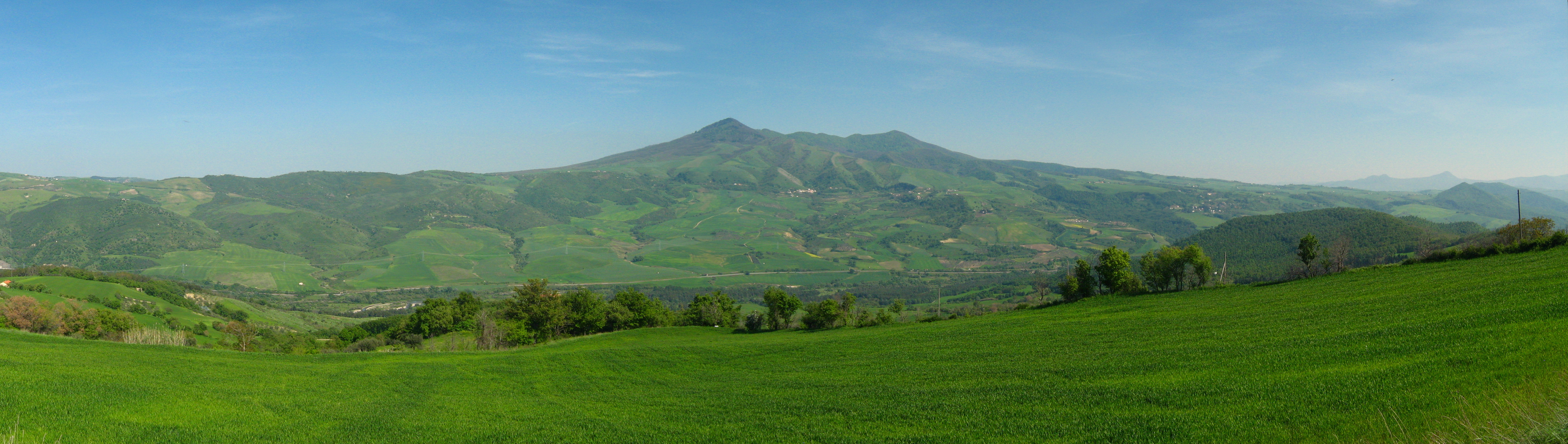
Mount Vulture, panoramic view.

=== Other regions ===
The grape has also recently been planted in Australia, California, and Texas as it thrives in predominantly sunny climates with a long ripening season. In Australia it is being introduced in the Murray Darling region with some success. Producers in Sierra Foothills, McLaren Vale, Margaret River, Mudgee and Riverland are also experimenting with plantings. Elsewhere in North America, it has been trialled in Arizona and in Ontario, Canada.

== Viticulture ==
The Aglianico vine buds early and grows best in dry climates with generous amounts of sunshine. It has good resistance to outbreaks of oidium, but can be very susceptible to Peronospora. It also has low resistance to botrytis, but since it is much too tannic to make a worthwhile dessert wine, the presence of this noble rot in the vineyard is more of a viticultural hazard than an advantage.

The grape has a tendency to ripen late, with harvests as late as November in some parts of southern Italy. If the grape is picked too early, or with excessive yields, the grape can be aggressively tannic. The vine seems to thrive in particularly volcanic soils.

== Wine styles ==
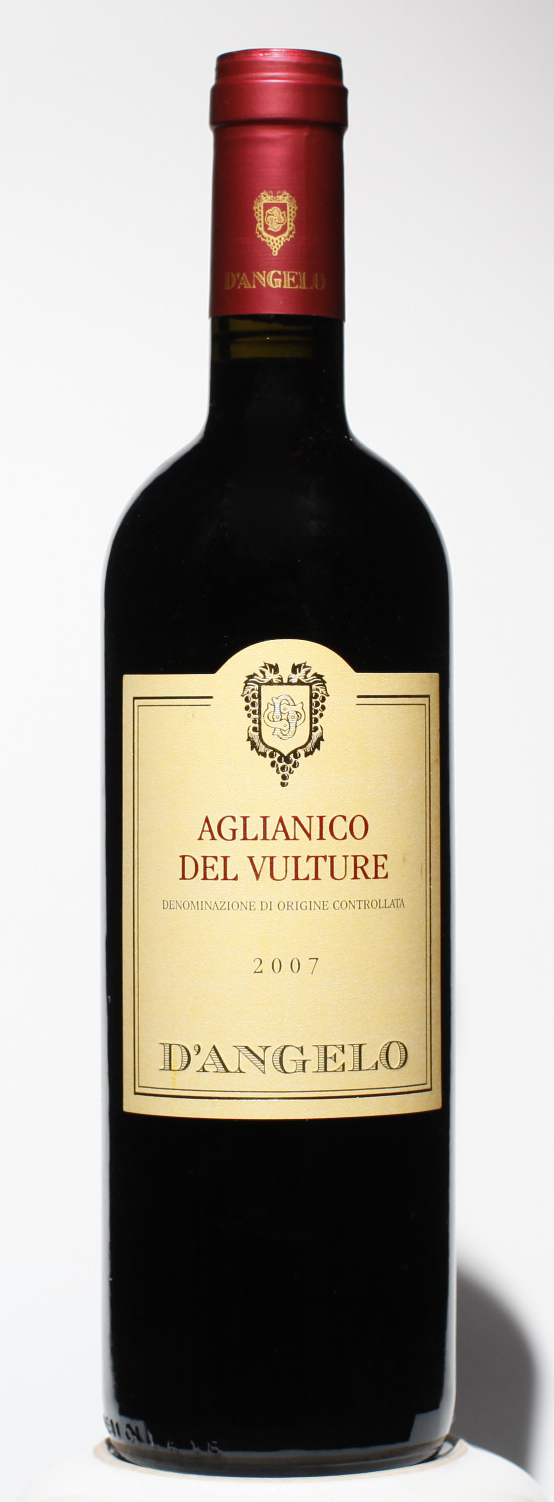
A bottle of Aglianico del Vulture

Wines produced from Aglianico tend to be full-bodied with firm tannins and high acidity, endowing them with good aging potential. The rich flavors of the wine make it appropriate for pairing with rich meats such as lamb. In Campania, the grape is sometimes blended with Cabernet Sauvignon and Merlot in the production of some Indicazione Geografica Tipica (IGT) wines.

In its youth, Aglianico is very tannic and concentrated, requiring a few years of ageing before it can be approachable. As it ages, the fruit becomes more pronounced and the tannins more balanced with the rest of the wine. The trademark coloring of the wine is a deep garnet. In well made examples of the wine, it can have chocolate and plum aromas.

== Synonyms ==
Aglianico is also known under the following synonyms: Aglianco di Puglia, Aglianica, Aglianica De Pontelatone, Aglianichella, Aglianichello, Aglianico Amaro, Aglianico Comune, Aglianico Crni, Aglianico del Vulture, Aglianico di Benevento, Aglianico di Castellaneta, Aglianico di Lapio, Aglianico di Taurasi, Aglianico Femminile, Aglianico Liscio, Aglianico Mascolino, Aglianico Nero, Aglianico Noir, Aglianico Pannarano, Aglianico Trignarulo, Aglianico Tringarulo, Aglianico Verase, Aglianico Zerpoluso, Aglianico Zerpuloso, Aglianicone, Aglianicuccia, Agliano, Agliantica, Agliatica, Agliatico, Agnanico, Agnanico di Castellaneta, Alianiko, Cascavoglia, Cassano, Cerasole, Ellanico, Ellenica, Ellenico, Fiano Rosso, Fresella, Gagliano, Gesualdo, Ghiandara, Ghianna, Ghiannara, Glianica, Gnanica, Gnanico, Granica, Granico, Hellanica, Malvasia, Olivella, Olivella di San Cosmo, Pie di Colombo, Prie Blanc, Ruopolo, Spriema, Tintora, Tintora di Cerinola, Tringarulo, Uva Aglianica, Uva Castellaneta, Uva dei Cani, Uva di Castellaneta, Uva Nera, Zuccherina.

== See also ==
- Aglianico del Vulture
- Aglianicone
- Taurasi DOCG
