= Piedirosso =

Variety of grape

- Grape (Vitis)
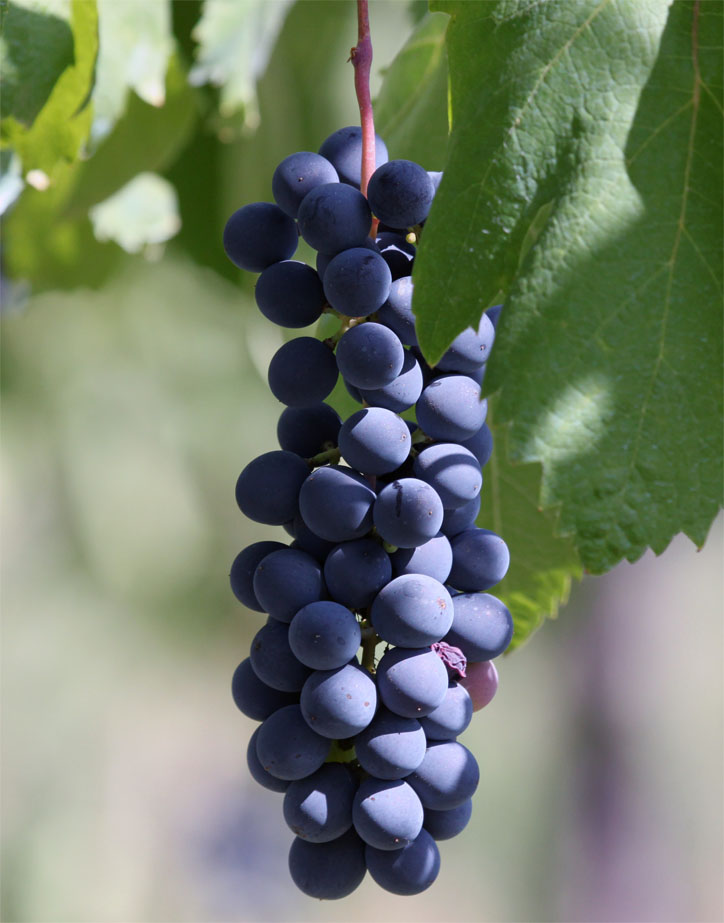
- Color of berry skin: Noir
- Species: Vitis vinifera
- Also called: See list of synonyms
- Origin: Italy
- VIVC number: 9239

Piedirosso is a red Italian wine grape variety that is planted primarily in the Campania region. The grape is considered a specialty of the region, being used to produce wines for local and tourist consumption. Its name "piedirosso" means "red feet" that reflects the bottom of the vine which used to be red similar to the red feet of a pigeon.

The grape is believed to be one of the parent varieties of the central Italy grape Abbuoto, possibly a crossing with Casavecchia. DNA analysis has also shown a close genetic relationship between Piedirosso and the white Campanian wine grape Caprettone that was previously thought to be a clone of Coda di Volpe.

== Synonyms ==
Piedirosso is also known under the synonyms Palombina, Palombina Nera, Palumbina Nera, Palumbo, Perepalummo, Pererusso, Piede Colombo, Piede di Colombo, Piede di Palumbo, Piedepalumbo, Streppa Verde, Strepparossa.
