= Coda di Volpe =

Variety of grape

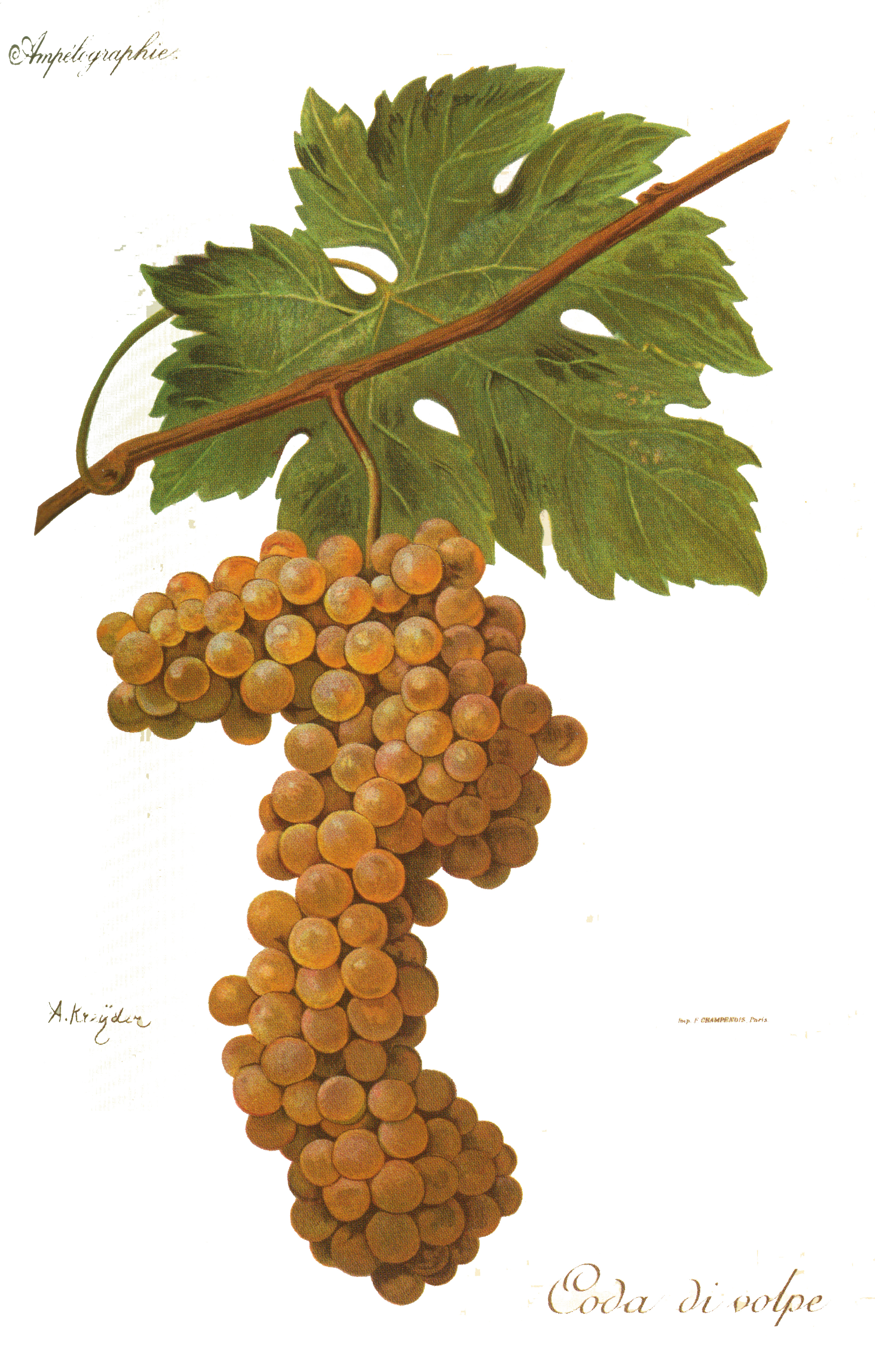
Coda di Volpe painted for L'Ampélographie by Viala and Vermorel

Coda di Volpe is a white Italian wine grape variety that has been historically grown in the Campania region around the town of Naples. It is often confused with another white Italian wine grape, Emilia, that share many of the same synonyms as Coda di Volpe.

== Relationship to other grapes ==
For many years, the white Campanian variety Caprettone was thought to be a clone of Coda di Volpe but DNA analysis in the early 21st century showed that the two grapes were distinct varieties and not closely related. Likewise, Coda di Pecora was also discovered to be a distinct variety. Also, while it shares the synonym Pallagrello with the Campania varieties Pallagrello bianco and Pallagrello nero, there is no known genetic relationship between the three grape varieties.

== Synonyms ==
Various synonyms have been used to describe Coda di Volpe and its wines including Alopecis, Cianca rossa, Coada Vulpi, Coda di Pecora, Coda di Volpe bianca, Coda di Volpe de Maddaloni, Coda di Vulpe durante, Crapettone, Durante, Falerno, Guarnaccia bianca, Lisica opasca bjelaja, Lisitcha opachka biala, Pallagrello and Pallegrello bianco.
