= Barbara =

Barbara may refer to:

== People ==
- Barbara (given name)
- Barbara (painter) (1915–2002), pseudonym of Olga Biglieri, Italian futurist painter
- Barbara (singer) (1930–1997), French singer
- Barbara Popović (born 2000), also known mononymously as Barbara, Macedonian singer
- Bárbara (footballer) (born 1988), Brazilian footballer
- Barbara Arrowsmith Young, Canadian entrepreneur

== Film and television ==
- Barbara (1961 film), a West German film
- Bárbara (film), a 1980 Argentine film
- Barbara (1997 film), a Danish film directed by Nils Malmros, based on Jacobsen's novel
- Barbara (2012 film), a German film
- Barbara (2017 film), a French film
- Barbara (TV series), a British sitcom

== Places ==
- Barbara station, a Paris Metro station in Montrouge and Bagneux, France
- Barbaria (region), or al-Barbara, an ancient region in Northeast Africa
- Barbara, Arkansas, U.S.
- Barbara, Gaza, a former Palestinian village near Gaza
- Barbara, Marche, a town in Italy
- Berbara (disambiguation), or al-Barbara, Lebanon
- Berbara, Byblos, a village in Lebanon
- Berbara, Akkar District, a village in Lebanon
- Berbera (Somali: Barbara), Somalia

== Print ==
- Bárbara (comics), an Argentine comic book series
- Barbara, a 1939 novel by Danish-writing Faroese author Jørgen-Frantz Jacobsen
- Major Barbara (play), a 1905 play by George Bernard Shaw

== Music ==
- Barbara
- Barbara (We Are Scientists album), 2010
- Barbara (Trixie Mattel album), 2020
- Barbara, a 1996 album by Barbara
- "Barbara" (The Beach Boys song), a song by Dennis Wilson of The Beach Boys
- "Barbarasong" ("Barbara Song"), from Weill's The Threepenny Opera
- "Barbara", a 1927 song written by Abner Silver
- "Barbara", a 1977 song by Chris Roberts
- "Barbara", a 1968 song by George Morgan
- "Barbara", a 1960 song by The Temptations
- "Barbara", a song by Martin Mann
- "Barbara", a 1979 song by Enzo Carella

== Ships ==
- Barbara (ship), one of several merchant ships by that name
- HMS Barbara, more than one ship of the British Royal Navy
- USS Barbara (SP-704), a United States Navy patrol boat

== Other ==
- Barbara (moth), a genus of moths
- 234 Barbara, an asteroid
- Barbara, a mnemonic devised by mediaeval scholasticism for a particular syllogism

== See also ==
- Barbara's Bakery, food brand
- Santa Barbara (disambiguation)
- Barbarella (disambiguation)
- Barbary Coast (disambiguation)
- Barbera (disambiguation)
- Barabara, a traditional dwelling of the Aleutian Islands
