= Saint Barbara (disambiguation) =

Saint Barbara was an early Christian saint and martyr.

Saint Barbara may also refer to:

- Saint Barbara (The Cloisters), sculpture statuette in limewood with paint
- Saint Barbara (van Eyck), paintings by Netherlandish artist Jan van Eyck
- Saint Barbara (Parmigianino), oil on panel painting by Parmigianino
- Saint Barbara with a Donor, canvas painting by Lattanzio Gambara

== See also ==
- Saint Barbara Altarpiece (disambiguation)
- St. Barbara's Church (disambiguation)
- Santa Barbara (disambiguation)
