= Barbarella =

Barbarella may refer to:

== Arts and entertainment ==
- Barbarella (comics), the title character of a comic book created by Jean-Claude Forest
  - Barbarella (film), a 1968 film based on the comic book starring Jane Fonda
  - Barbarella (musical) a 2004 musical based on the film

== People ==
- Carla Barbarella (born 1940), Italian politician
- Tommy Barbarella, American keyboardist Thomas Elm, a member of New Power Generation

== Other uses ==
- Barbarella (band), a Dutch female pop trio
- Barbarellas, an Irish pop duo
- "Barbarella" (song), a song by Scott Weiland from 12 Bar Blues
- Barbarella: the 80's Musical, a 2015 musical
- "Barbarella", a song from the album Illumina by Alisha's Attic
- "Barbarella", a 1983 song by The Bongos
- Barbarella (festival), a Dominican electronic music festival
- Caladenia barbarella or dragon orchid

== Places ==
- Barbarella (Växjö) a defunct discoteque in Sweden
- Barbarella's, a nightclub and music venue in Birmingham, England

== Objects ==
- Barbarella (rocket), a German hybrid rocket launched from the Barbara drilling platform in the Baltic Sea

== See also ==
- Barbaraella, a genus of pseudoscorpions
