= Barbara (ship) =

Several ships have been named Barbara:

- Barbara (1771 ship) was launched in Philadelphia and came to England circa 1787. She initially sailed as a West Indiaman, but then between 1788 and 1800 made five complete voyages as a whaler. The Spanish captured her late in 1800 in the Pacific during her sixth whaling voyage.
- Barbara (1799 ship) was built in France in 1792. The Royal Navy captured her circa 1798, gave her a thorough repair in one of their yards ("King's Yard"), but then sold her. She sailed on one voyage as a West Indiaman. She then became a whaler in the British Southern Whale Fisheries. On her first whaling voyage she sailed to Walvis Bay. She was captured, either near there or on her way home, and taken into the Río de la Plata.
- Barbara (1926 ship) was built by A.G. Weser, in Bremen. She was a rotor ship, with three rotors.

== See also ==
- HMS Barbara – one of two vessels of the Royal Navy by that name
- USS Barbara (SP-704), a United States Navy patrol boat in commission from 1917 to 1918
