= Bazoș Dendrological Park =

Nature reserve in Romania

Bazoș Dendrological Park Romanian: Parcul Dendrologic Bazoș
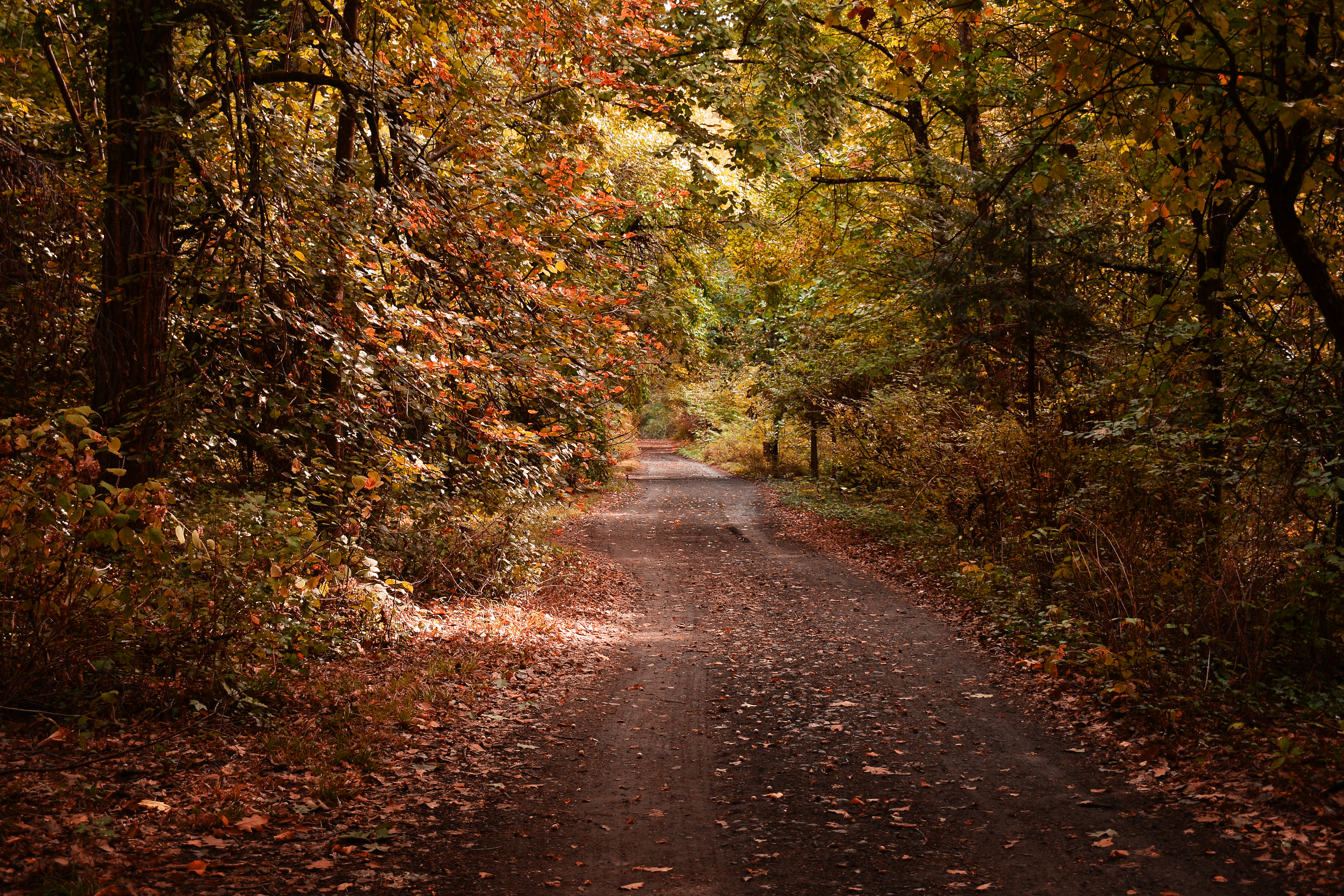

- Location within Romania
- Interactive map of Bazoș Dendrological Park

Geography
- Location: Timiș, Romania
- Coordinates: 45°44′59″N 21°25′54″E
- Area: 60 ha (150 acres)

Administration
- Established: 1914
- Authority: SCDEP Timișoara

Bazoș Dendrological Park (Romanian: Parcul Dendrologic Bazoș) is an arboretum located in Bazoșu Nou, Timiș County, Romania, about 20 kilometers southeast of Timișoara, on the territory between the Bega and Timiș rivers. Since 1994, it has had the status of a protected area for the protection of the biodiversity of the genofund and the ecofund.

== History ==
The Bazoş estate was acquired in 1867 by Barons István Ambrózy and Lajos Ambrózy, while the dendrological park in Bazoșu Nou was later developed by Count Lajos Ambrózy, who served as the Austro-Hungarian Empire's ambassador to the United States. Between 1909 and 1914, under the guidance of German landscaper Franz von Engerhord, director of the Düsseldorf Botanical Garden, a portion of the 150-year-old natural oak forest on the family estate was transformed into a landscaped area and enriched with dozens of plant species imported from America, particularly from the Harvard University arboretum.

While the park was being developed, a castle was also constructed. The castle, which featured 100 rooms, served as Ambrózy's vacation residence. Following the end of World War I and the dissolution of the Austro-Hungarian Empire, Count Ambrózy was expropriated through agrarian reform, and the park's land was transferred to the Romanian state. According to one account, an enraged Ambrózy ordered the castle's demolition and distributed the bricks among the residents of Bazoșu Nou. Another version suggests that he sold the castle and permanently relocated to Vienna. In 1934, the new owners allegedly demolished the building and sold the bricks to settlers arriving from Transylvania. The only remaining structure from the original estate is the castle's water tower.

In 1934, the park was acquired by the State Forest House and assigned to the Institute of Forest Research and Management. It was designated a scientific reserve in 1954, and in 1982, it was officially declared a natural monument.

== Description ==
The Bazoș Dendrological Park spans 60 hectares within the boundaries of Bazoșu Nou. It comprises the Great Park (36 hectares), the American Park (1.5 hectares), and several nurseries dedicated to cultivating exotic species. Through international exchanges, the park's botanical collection has grown to include nearly 800 taxa from five continents. It features the country's most comprehensive collection of American oaks and hickories (Carya). Among its many rare or unique species are Pinus taeda, known as the loblolly pine; Castanea dentata, or the American chestnut (once widespread in the United States and Canada but now virtually extinct there); Pinus jeffreyi, Korean spruce, and others. The park's oldest tree is a centuries-old oak estimated to be 500 years old, with a circumference of 6 m and a height of 30 m.

Since 1994, the park has been designated a protected area to safeguard biodiversity, genofund, ecofund, and to help maintain ecological balance in Timiș County. It is a member of the International Association of Botanic Gardens and, since 2011, has been twinned with the Arbofolia-Arboretum National des Barres in France.

The park is a popular tourist destination, with up to 1,000 visitors registered on Sundays.
