= Barbara fulgens =

Scientific classification
- Domain: Eukaryota
- Kingdom: Animalia
- Phylum: Arthropoda
- Class: Insecta
- Order: Lepidoptera
- Family: Tortricidae
- Genus: Barbara
- Species: B. fulgens

Binomial name
- Barbara fulgens Kuznetsov, 1969

Species of moth

Barbara fulgens, the lustrous spruce cone moth, is a moth of the family Tortricidae. It is found in north-eastern China (Heilongjiang province) and eastern Russia (Khabarovsk Krai).

The wingspan is 14–17 mm. Adults are on wing in March.

The larvae feed on Picea koraiensis and Picea sibiricus. It is a pest of Korean spruce in the Heilongjiang province in China, with the larvae destroying the cones of their host plant.
