= Master Francke =

North German Gothic painter (c. 1380–c. 1440)

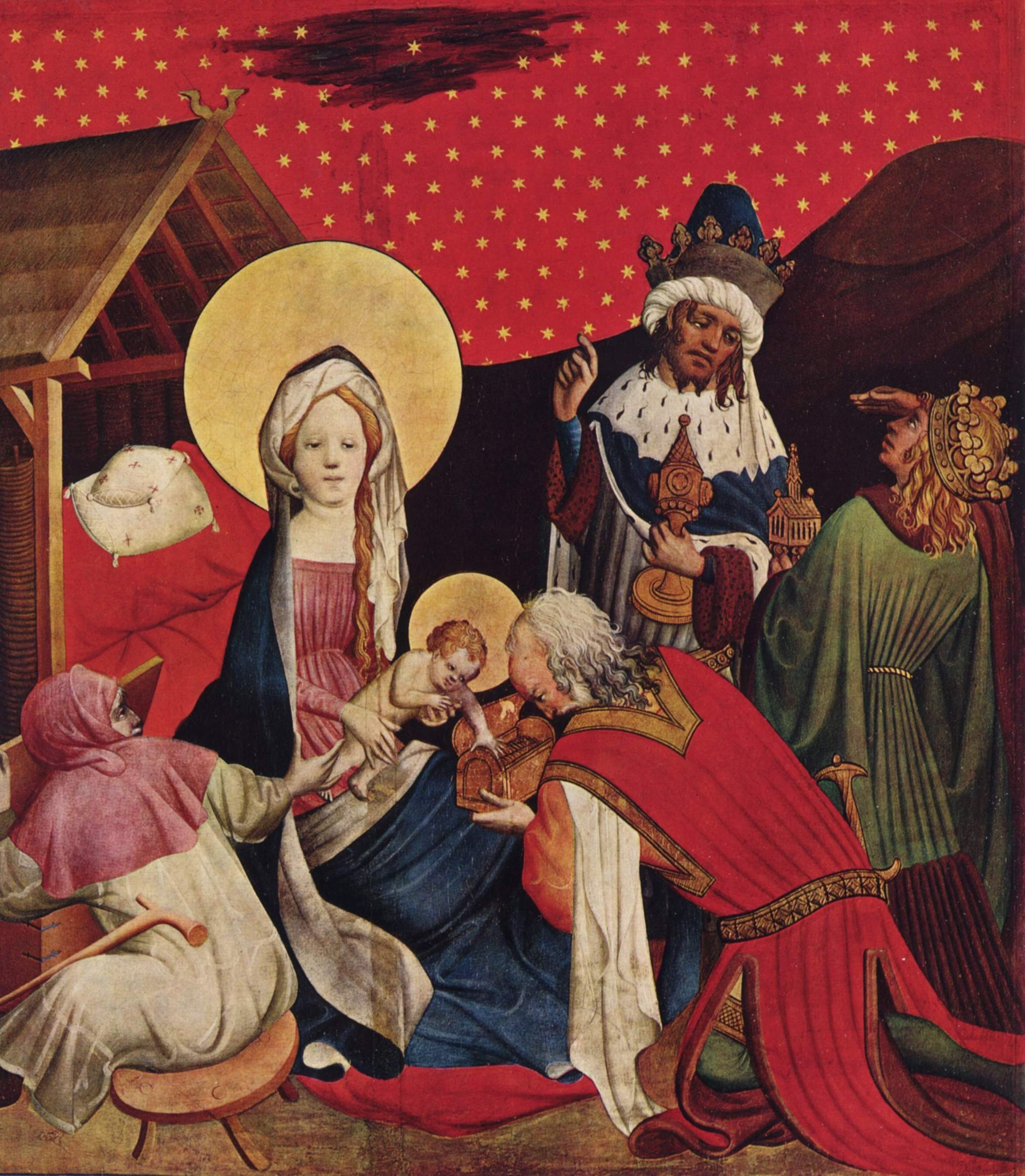
Adoration of the Magi from the St Thomas Altarpiece

Master Francke O.P. (or Meister Francke, Frater Francke, respectively German for "Master Francke" and Latin for "Brother Francke") was a North German Gothic painter and Dominican friar, born ca. 1380 in the Lower Rhine region or possibly Zutphen in the Netherlands, who died ca. 1440, probably in Hamburg, where he was based at the end of his known career. He is called "Fratre Francone Zutphanico" ("Brother Frank of Zutphen") in one document. He may have trained as an illuminator and painter in France or the Netherlands, and later worked in Münster, before joining in St John's Priory in Hamburg by 1424 at the latest.

== Works ==
Two main altarpieces attributed to him survive, dedicated to St Thomas of Canterbury and Saint Barbara, in an unusually intense style, showing awareness of French and Early Netherlandish court art. He probably arrived in Hamburg after the death in 1415 of the previous leading artist there, Master Bertram, and shows little or no influence from him, but he may have been influenced by the more courtly style of Conrad von Soest, about ten years older than Francke, who worked to the south in Westphalia.

The Hamburg association of traders to England commissioned an altarpiece from "Mester Francke[nn]" in 1424; the contract does not survive, but is mentioned in their memorial book. This is probably the "St Thomas (of Canterbury) Altarpiece", completed in 1436, of which parts survive in the Kunsthalle, Hamburg. The rather earlier St Barbara Altarpiece may have been commissioned for Finland, where it surfaced a century ago. The "Thomas Altar" has eight surviving scenes, but is missing its main panel and several others. The "Barbara Altar" has also eight scenes, on both sides of the wings to a carved wood central panel by another artist. At least two other panels are in museum collections. Francke was almost entirely forgotten after the Renaissance until the end of the 19th century when, like Master Bertram, he was rediscovered and published by Alfred Lichtwart, Director of the Hamburg Kunsthalle.

== Gallery ==
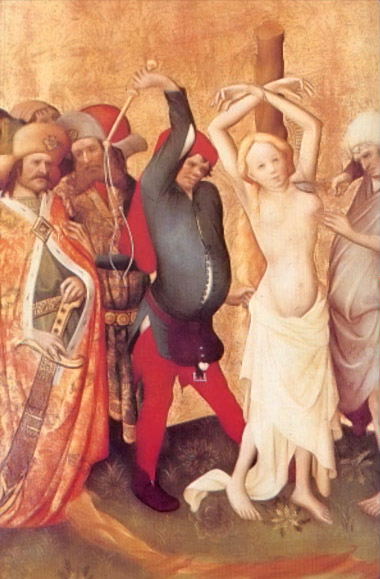
Martyrdom of St Barbara from the Saint Barbara Altarpiece, now in Helsinki, (before 1424)

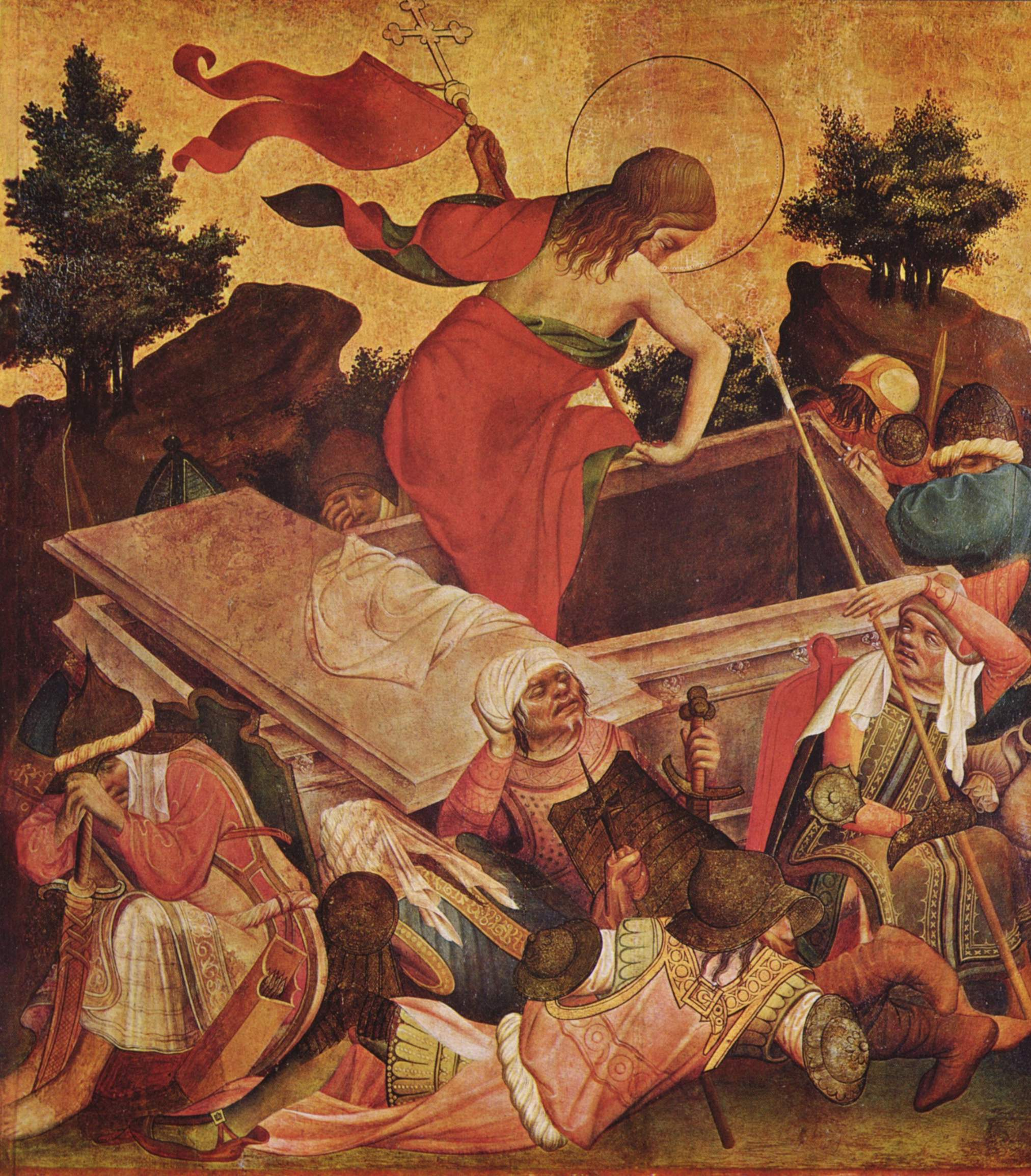
Resurrection of Jesus (ca. 1424)

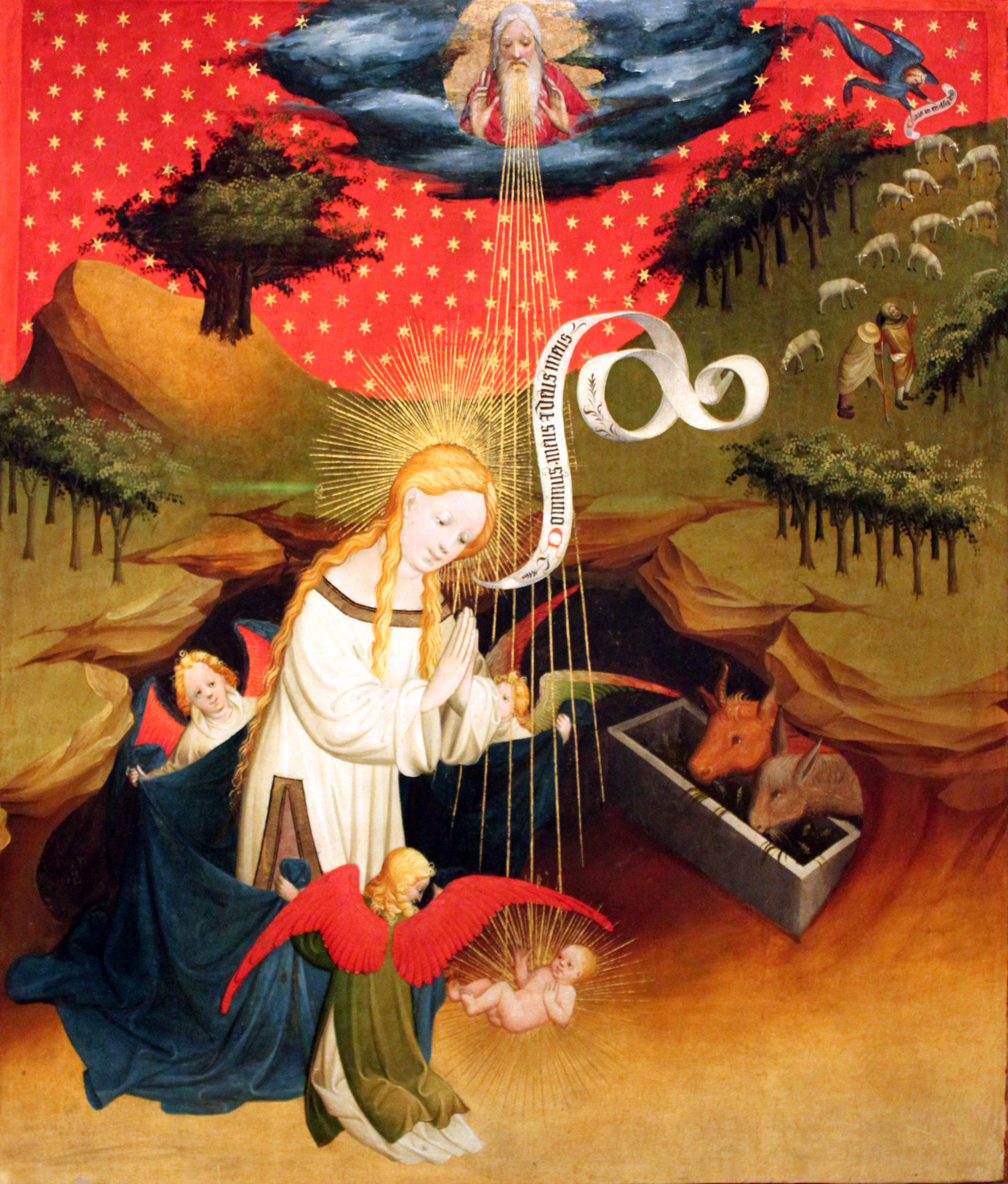
Adoration of the Child, 1426, Kunsthalle Hamburg

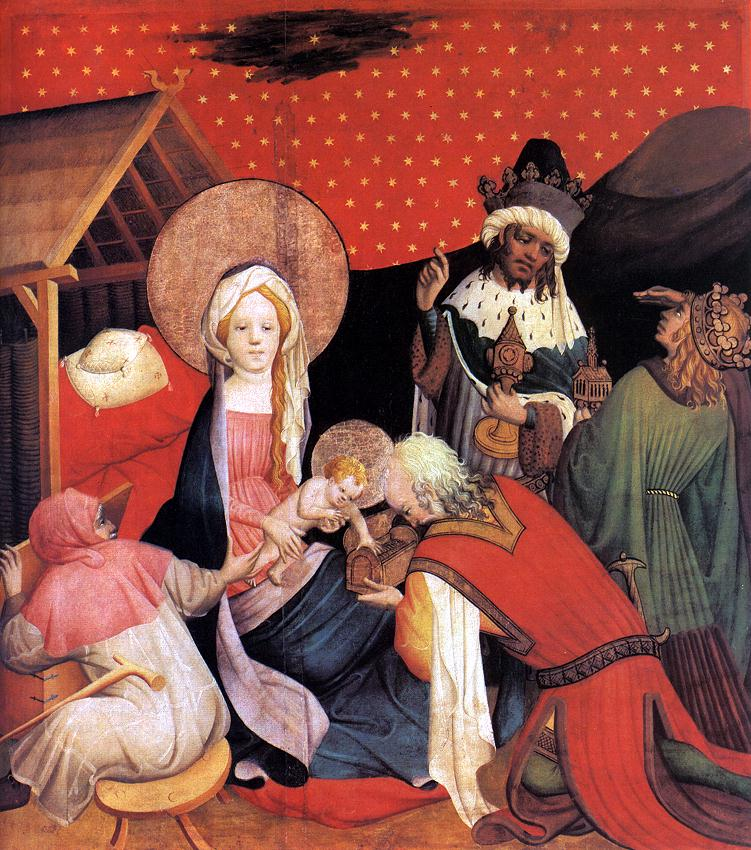
Adoration of the Magi, 1426, Kunsthalle Hamburg

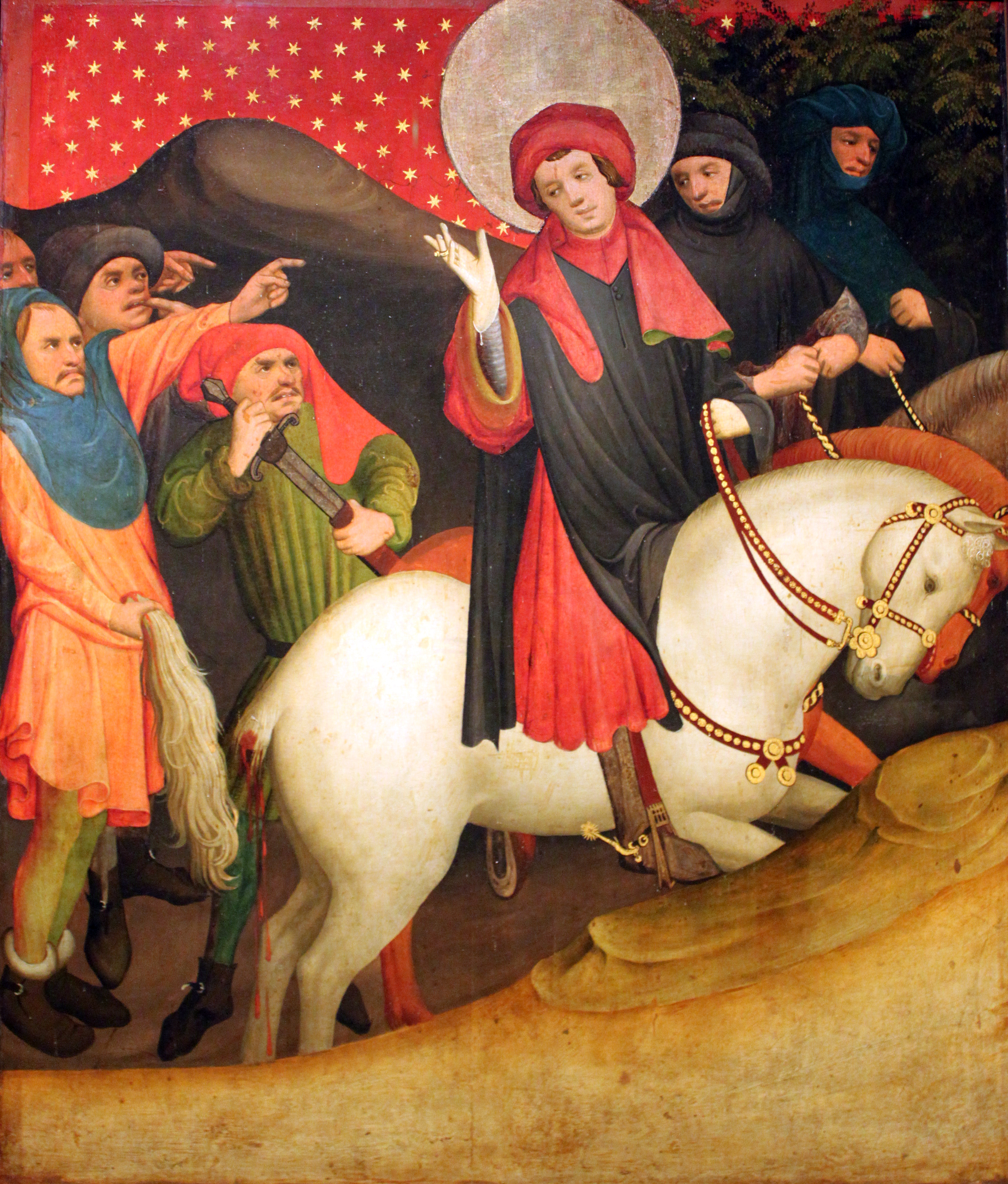
The Mocking of Saint Thomas of Canterbury, 1426, Kunsthalle Hamburg

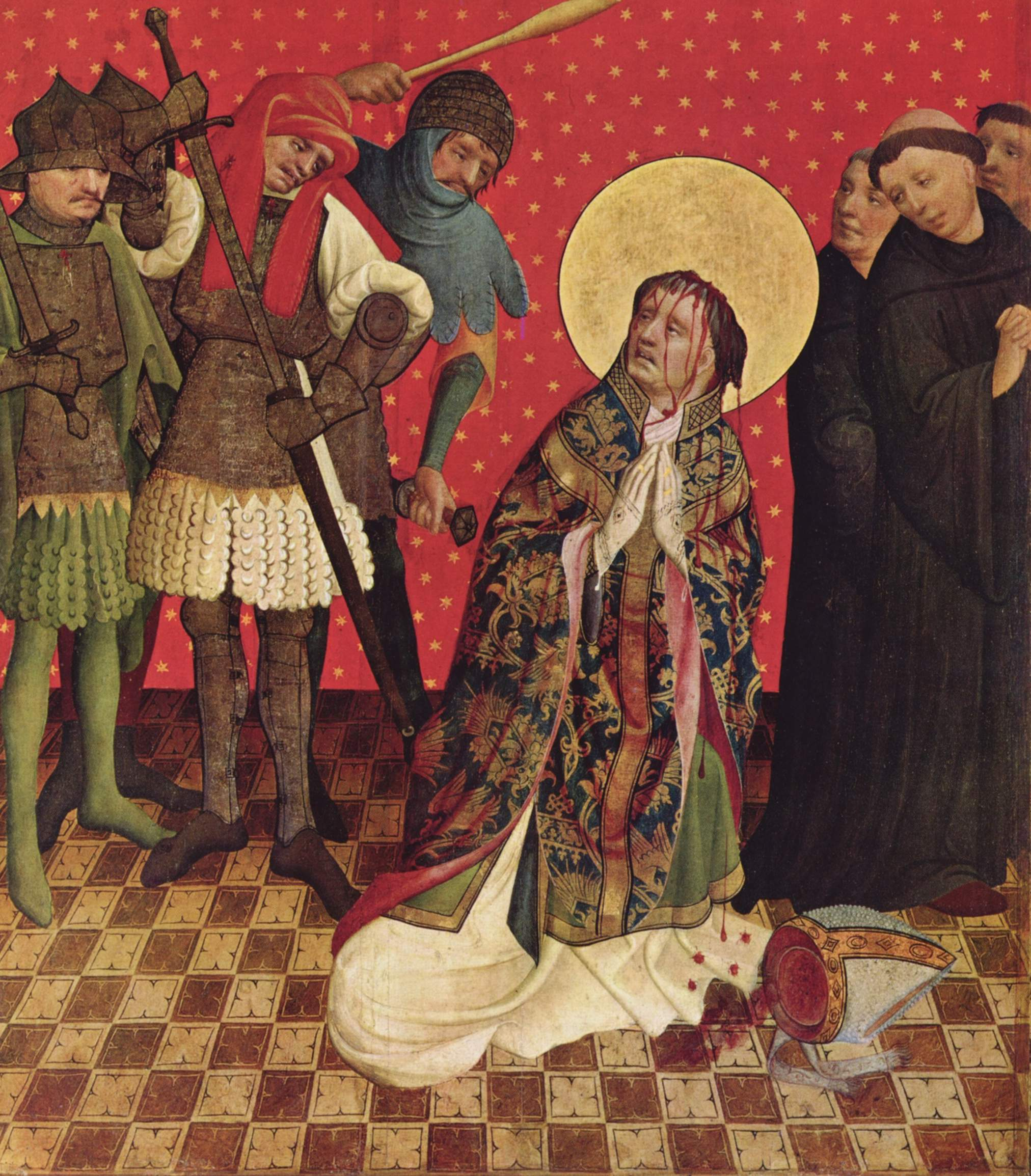
The Martyrdom of Saint Thomas of Canterbury, 1426, Kunsthalle Hamburg

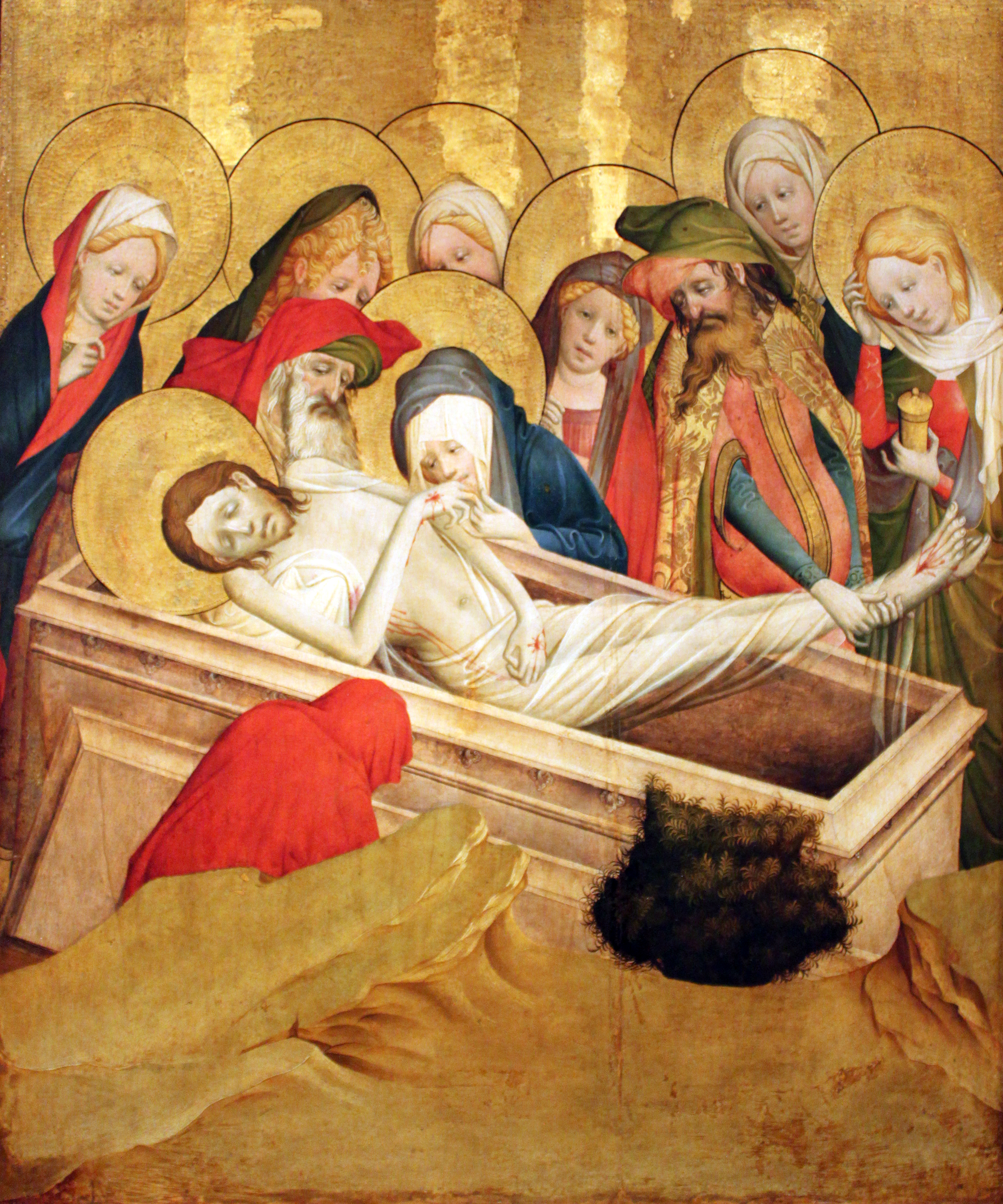
Entombment of Christ, 1430, Kunsthalle Hamburg

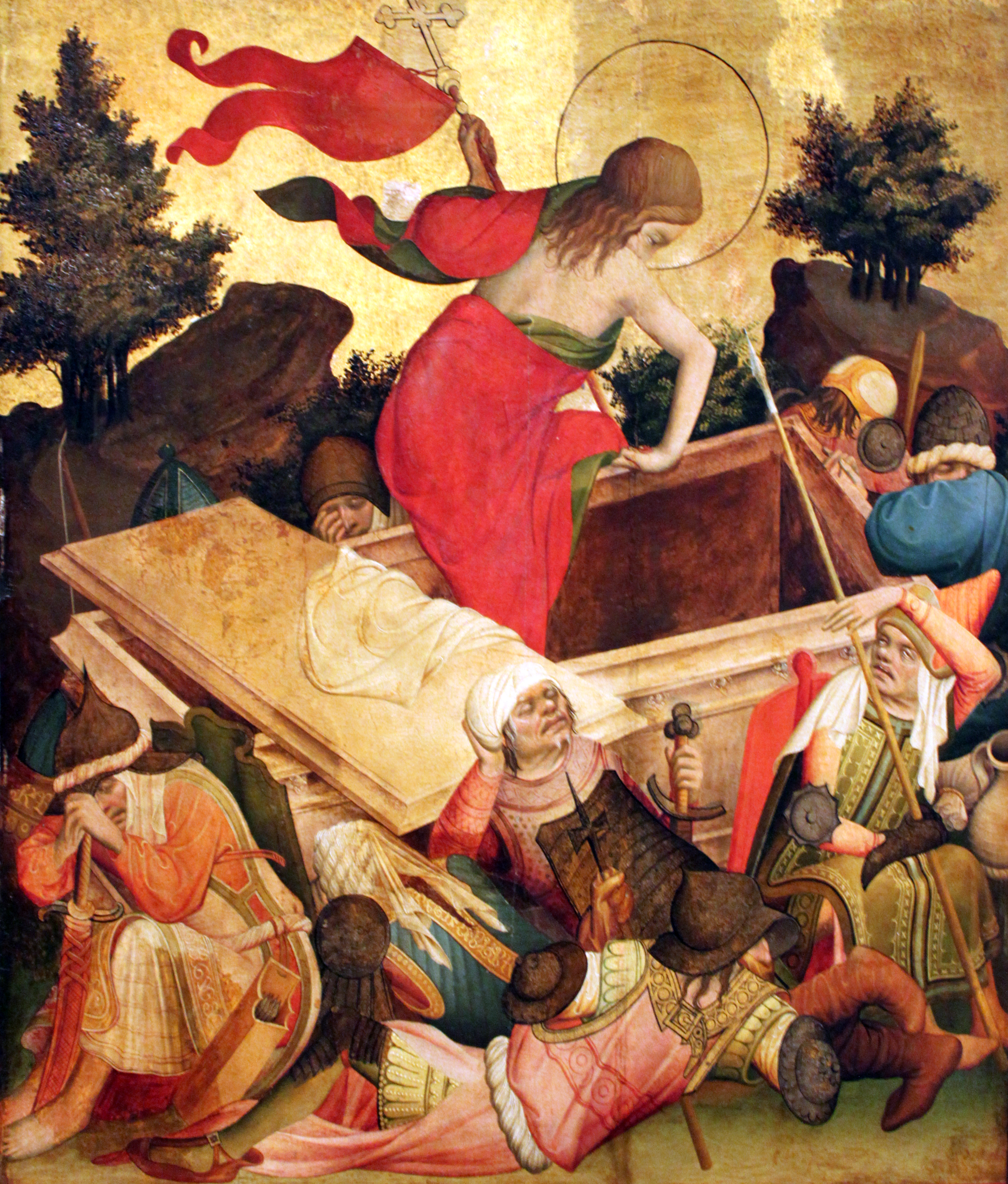
Resurrection of Christ, 1430, Kunsthalle Hamburg

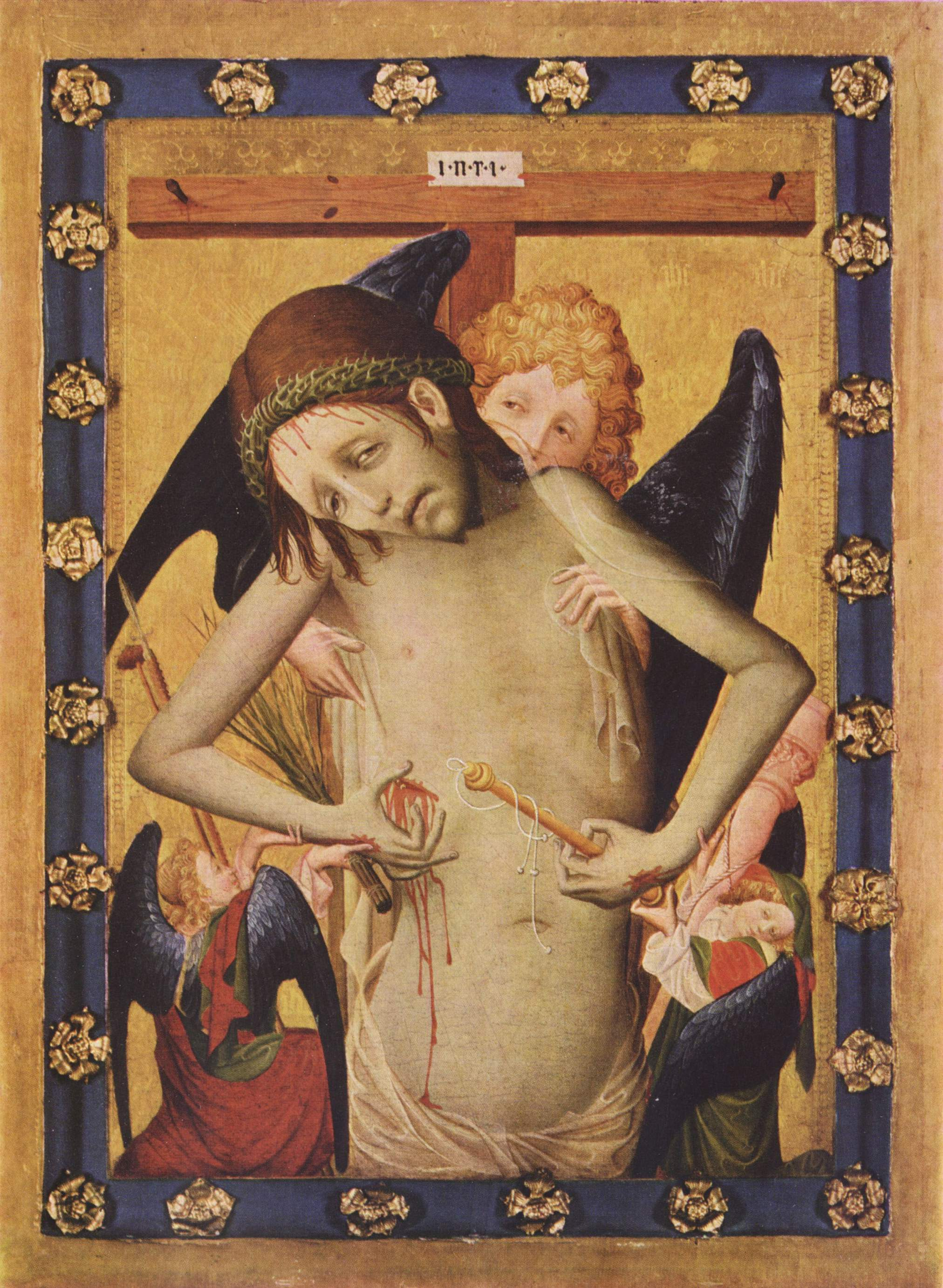
Schmerzensmann (ca. 1430), Museum der bildenden Künste Leipzig

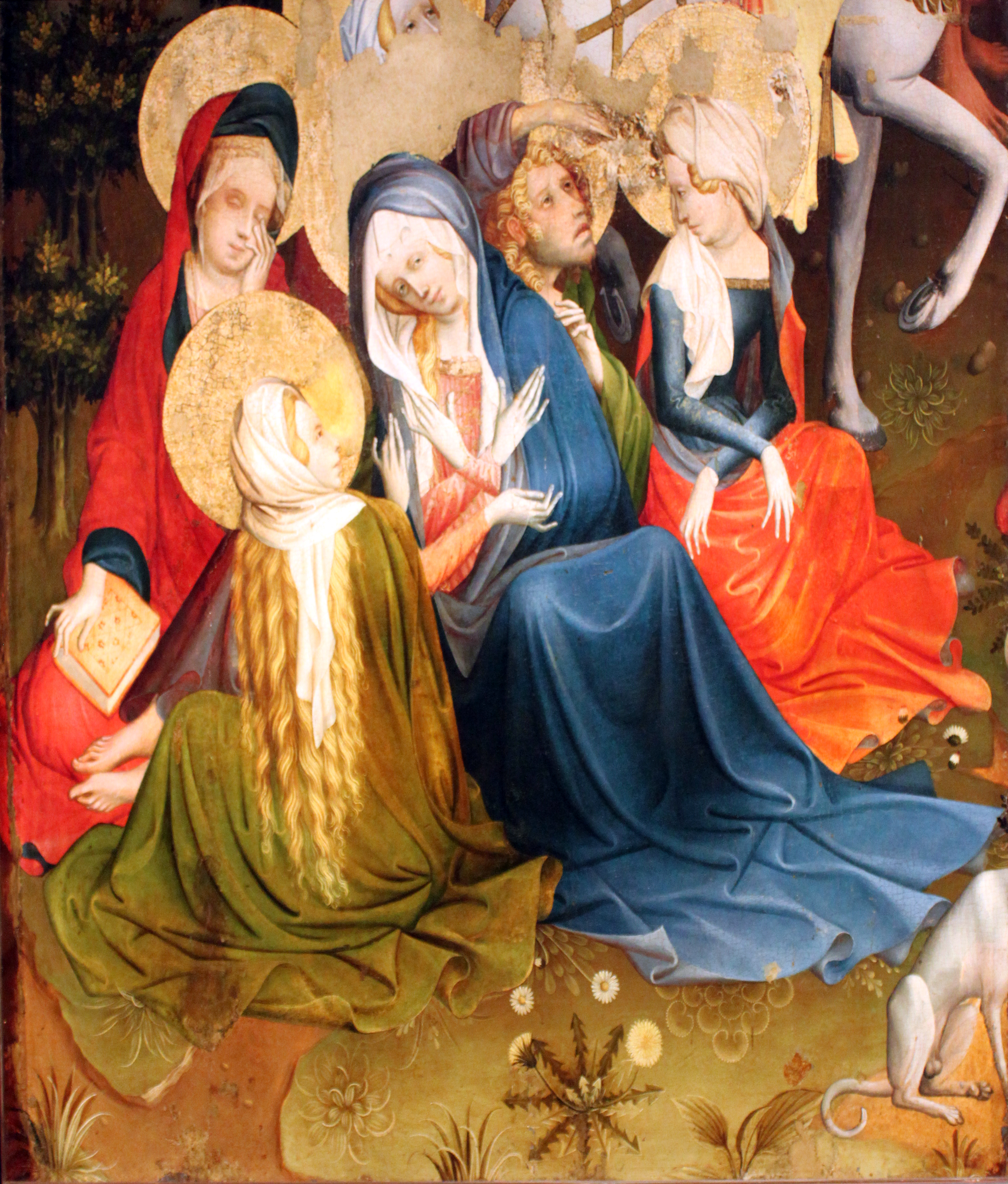
The Women at the Cross (fragment), 1435, Kunsthalle Hamburg

== See also ==
- List of German painters
