= Barbarella (Växjö) =

Discotheque in Växjö, Sweden

Coordinates: 56.886444°N 14.765754°E

Discotheque Barbarella was a discoteque located at Mörners väg 122, 352 46, Växjö, Sweden, prominent in the 1970s. In a city of very limited entertainment, Barbarella played a central role. The disco opened in 1971 in an industrial area in the outskirts and drew crowds from many parts of southeastern Sweden. It closed in 1992.

== Concerts at Barbarella ==
The brains behind Barbarella succeeded in attracting many well-known Swedish and international bands of the 1970s to perform in Växjö. Notable concerts are as follows:

- Tony Walter's Stardust International & Aldo Wiking Show, 1 October 1971
- Colosseum, 2 October 1971
- Status Quo, 27 November 1971
- Sweet, 16 January 1972
- Procol Harum, 8 October 1972
- Hoola Bandoola Band, 12 February 1972
- Landslaget, 11 September 1972
- Sveriges Jazzband, 8 November 1972
- Mc Guiness Flint, 9 November 1972
- Eric Burdon från The Animals, xx November 1972
- Tasavallan presidentti
- Jon Hiseman's Tempest, 8 January 1973
- Holje-bandet, February 1973
- Colosseum II featuring Jon Hiseman & Gary Moore, 8 May 1973
- Manfred Mann's Earth Band, 5 October 1973
- Scafell Pike, 12 October 1973
- Vinegar Joe, 30 November 1973
- Hörselmat (med Janne Schaffer), 1974
- Geordie, 4 May 1974
- Ted Gärdestad (med Nature), 23 August 1974
- Lena Andersson Show, 23 August 1974
- Pugh & Rainrocks, 30 August 1974
- Manfred Mann's Earth Band, 20 September 1974
- Savage Rose, 4 October 1974
- UFO, 8 oktober 1974
- Landslaget, 25 October 1974
- John Holm, 31 January 1975
- Greenslade featuring Dave Greenslade (ex. Colosseum), 30 mars 1975
- Attila, 7 June 1975
- Tomas Ledin, våren 1975
- Thin Lizzy, 18 October 1975
- Jojje Wadenius, 6 December 1975
- UFO, 13 March 1976
- AC/DC, 23 July 1976
- The Groundhogs, 11 September 1976
- Marsfolket, 12 December 1976
- Little Ekberg & Silvery Flames, 26 December 1976
- Stardust International, 29 December 1976
- Sex Pistols, 23-24 July 1977
- Pugh & Rainrocks, 12 November 1977
- Magnus Uggla, 23 November 1977
- Strix Q, 23 November 1977
- Jerry Williams & Alarm, 12 December 1978
- Buzzcocks, 17 March 1979
- Ebba Grön, 14 March 1981
- Peps Bluesband, 29 December 1982
- Sweet, 29 November 1991
- Doctors of Madness
- John Cale & Band
- Pugh Rogefeldt
- Ekseption
- Gasolin
- The Troggs
- Ian Hunter från Mott the Hoople
- Alexis Korner
- Heads Hands & Feet
- Tommy Körberg (med Solar Plexus)
- Gringo
- The Gasoline band
- Jack Downing & The Other side
- The Swinging Blue Jeans
- The Eleventh house featuring Larry Coryell, 8 February 19xx
- Paper Lace
- WigWam
- Kursaal Flyers
- Rockamöllan
- Dimensions (med Hasse)
- Shakin´Stevens & The Sunsets
- Trace (med Rick van der Linden från Ekseption)
- Secret Oyster
- Don Partridge & Slim Volume
- Kevin Coyne Band
- Jackpots
- Mammuth
- Björn Skifs & Blåblus
- Mikael Ramel och Unga Hjärtan
- Fläsket brinner
- Lalla Hansson
- Tears
- Kebnekaise
- Samla Mammas Manna
- Björn Afzelius Band
- Lotus
- Grus i Dojjan
- Basse Wickman & songs
- Lolos
- Lena-Maria & Sweet Wine
- Made in Sweden (George Wadenius, Tommy Kröberg, Vesa Altonen, Pekka Pohjola, Wlodek Gulgowski)
- Ray Montana band
- Wasa Express
- The Boppers
- Ted Åström & The Boogie Brothers
- Jackpots
