= Ceraso =

- Comune
- Comune di Ceraso
- Location within Italy Location within Campania
- Coordinates: 40°12′N 15°15′E
- Country: Italy
- Region: Campania
- Province: Province of Salerno (SA)
- Frazioni: Massascusa, Metoio, Petrosa, Santa Barbara, San Biase, San Sumino

Area
  - Total: 45.95 km^{2} (17.74 sq mi)
- Elevation: 340 m (1,120 ft)

Population (2001)
  - Total: 2,510
  - Density: 54.6/km^{2} (141/sq mi)
- Demonym: Cerasuoli
- Time zone: UTC+1 (CET)
  - Summer (DST): UTC+2 (CEST)
- Postal code: 84052
- Dialing code: 0974
- ISTAT code: 065040
- Patron saint: San Nicola di Bari
- Saint day: 6 December
- Website: Official website

Ceraso (Cilentan: Cirasu) is a town and comune (population 2,494) in the province of Salerno in the Campania region of south-western Italy.

== History ==
It is very likely that the Greeks of Phocaea and Velia travelled the entire territory of today's Municipality of Ceraso on their way up to the Terre Rosse and the Beta pass.

And it is not to be excluded that some of them, in search of good wood to feed the shipyard of Velia, stopped, and then held back, on the wide river terrace (river Palisco = mountain, today Palistro) at whose mouth it was the northern port of Velia. A place that seemed very charming to them, seen from the top of the Tempe, rich as it was in cherry trees of the genus prunus. A terrace surrounded by long-standing tall trees.

They certainly stayed there when the town became an important road junction. In fact, the fluvial road, the road along the Palistro, reached it; a short distance from that place passed the road to the Terre Rosse; from there the easy way started which, by today's Coste delle monache, led to the Alfa pass (Cannalonga) and from there to the Vallo di Diano.

Ceraso.

The first documented news of Ceraso, a parchment of Pope Eugene III, dates back to 6 May 1149, although some elements, the cult of San Nicola di Mira, the toponym, Kerasous which brings us back to the city of the same name in Pontus, suggest that the village had been founded before the year 1000.

The village was built around an important connecting road "La Via del Sale" which connected the Veline streets with the Ionian coast. Its importance grew when another road was added during the Roman age, today called "Costa delle Monache", which connected the town with a Roman toll station "Corneto" today Vallo della Lucania and during the Middle Ages it had reached a significant social development economic. The parish church of Ceraso is dedicated to San Nicola di Bari and was constructed in its present state during the 18th century, on the basis of the original church which was constructed during the 14th century

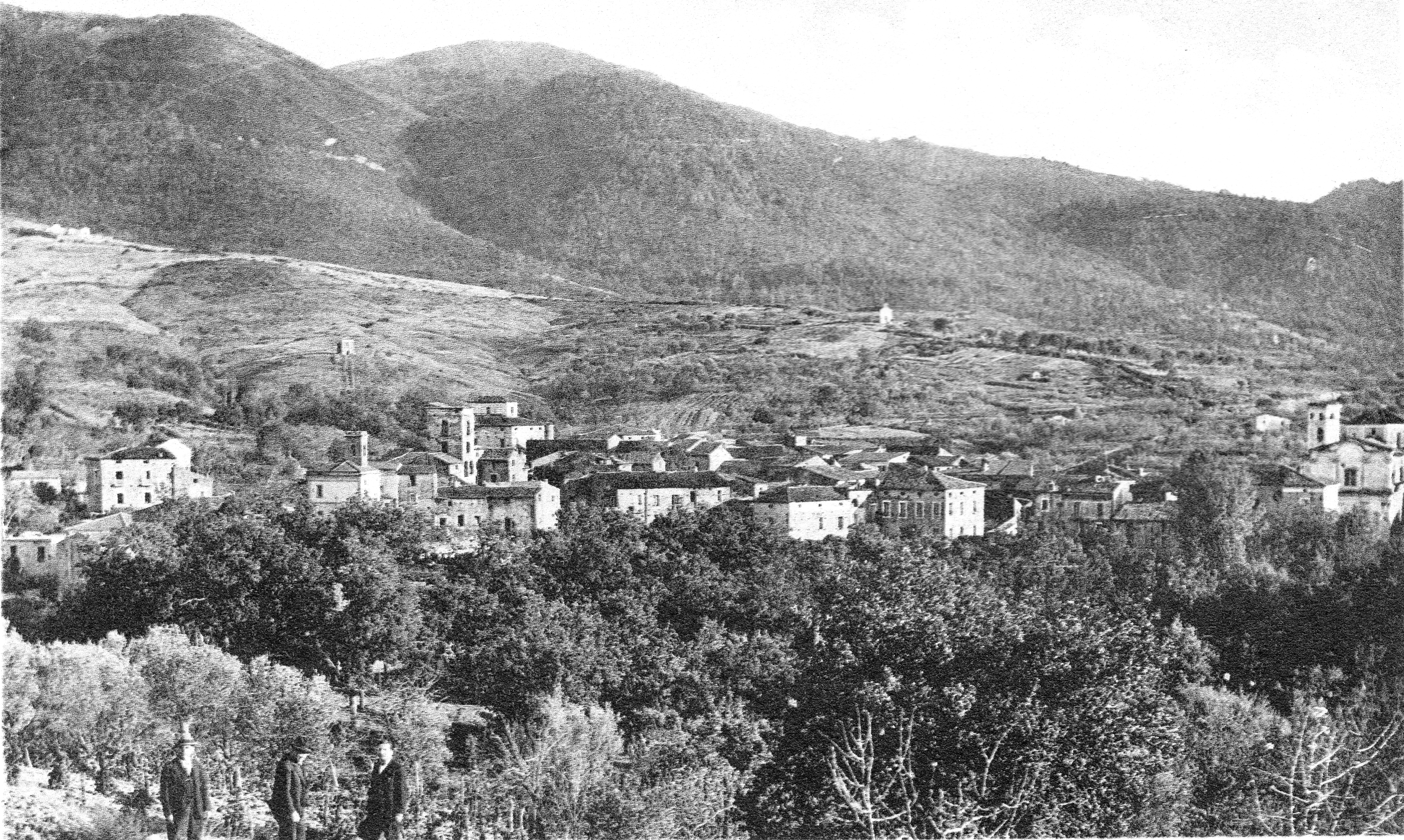
View of Ceraso early 1900s.

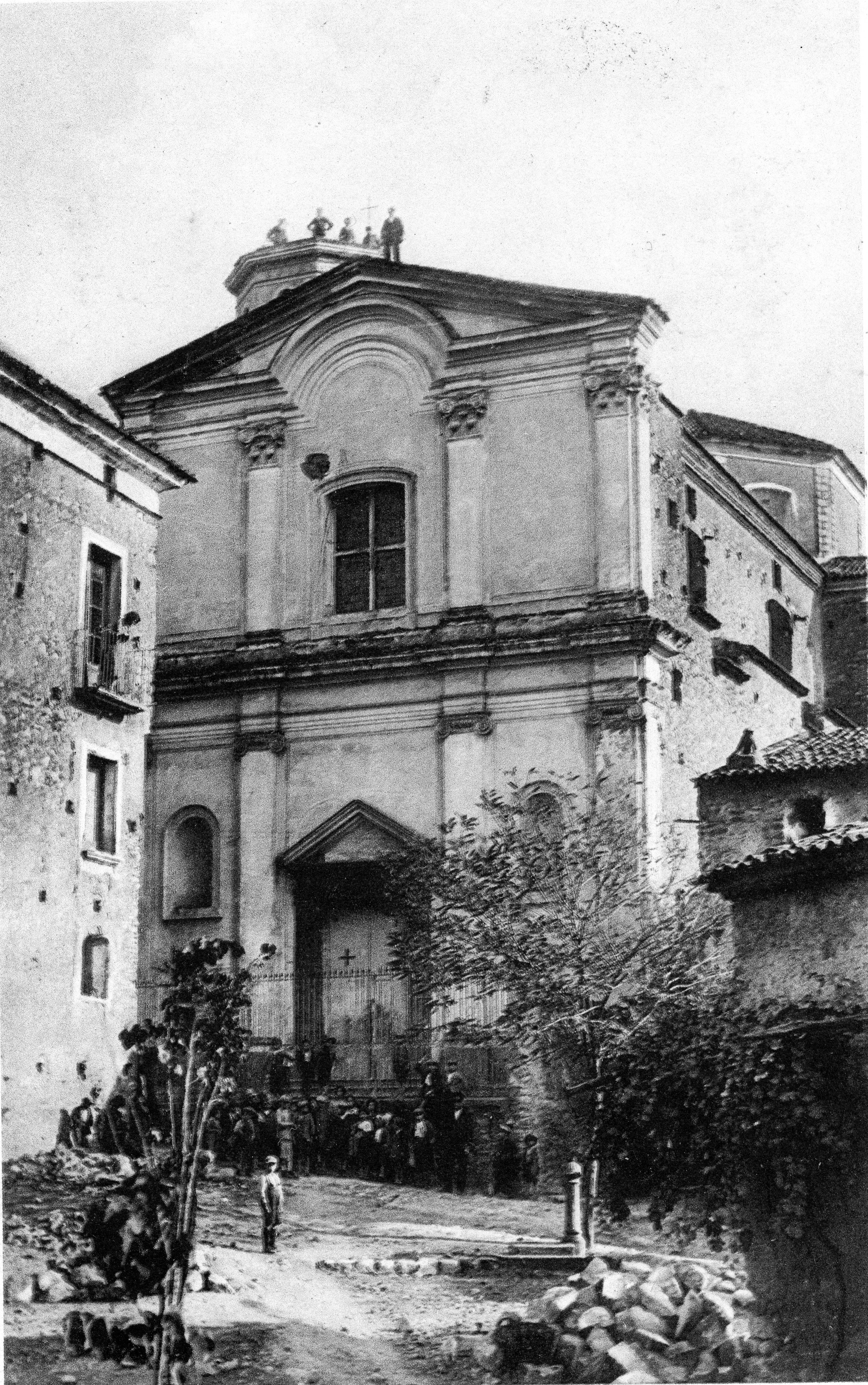
Church of San Nicola di Bari, early 1900s

.

Massascusa

It is most likely the first inhabited center that was formed in the current territory of Ceraso. After the destruction of Velia in 673, groups of refugees to whom the church guaranteed their survival through the libellum (freedom in exchange of work). Another element that confirms the era of the origins of Massascusa is the naming of the oldest church in the town to a pope, San Felice, who was the first to solicit donations in favor of a church.

At the beginning of the last century, the unique presence of industry in the area was of particular importance for the town. The Ravera brothers built a plant in the San Sumino area for the extraction of tannic acid, which gave considerable development to the rural economy and countered the phenomenon of emigration, which was very important in those years, because the residents did not lack work.

San Biase

The first document attesting the existence of San Biase as an already established inhabited center dates back to the year 993, but the toponym takes us back a few centuries. Probably a group of Armenian faithful from Sebaste fled due to iconoclastic persecutions embarking part of the mortal remains of San Biagio. It is probable that from Maratea, where the local Christians welcomed the relics of the Saint, in the exodus due to the continuous attacks of the Saracens, groups of families went up north bringing with them the cult of their Saint. The name of the town is in fact an agionimo, that is, it reproduces the name of the Saint to whom the first place of worship around which the town was formed was entitled.

Santa Barbara

Archaeological excavations have brought to light finds dating back to the 5th century BC; evidently the area must have been well known to the inhabitants of Velia, who must have established an outpost on the hill of the San Nicola district. In fact, on a stretch of the hill itself, leveled to obtain an area to be used for the threshing of the grain, ancient tombs with human remains emerged.

The foundation of Santa Barbara, which already existed as a church in 977, (Codex Diplomaticus Cavensis), probably with a small town, and then a Greek monastery, must be attributed to the presence of the Greek monks. The first official document certifying the existence of the University of Santa Barbara is a diploma from 1005: it clearly states that there was a residential nucleus established with the arrival of the first monk of Velia. The parchments inform us of Igumeni, of the flumen Bruca and of Mons Trevorio, news all confirming the arrival of the monks in the place from Velia, through the Via Bruca. The monks favored the development of the inhabited center and built a Cenobio dedicated to Santa Barbara, of which some remains still exist today.

Petrosa and Metoio

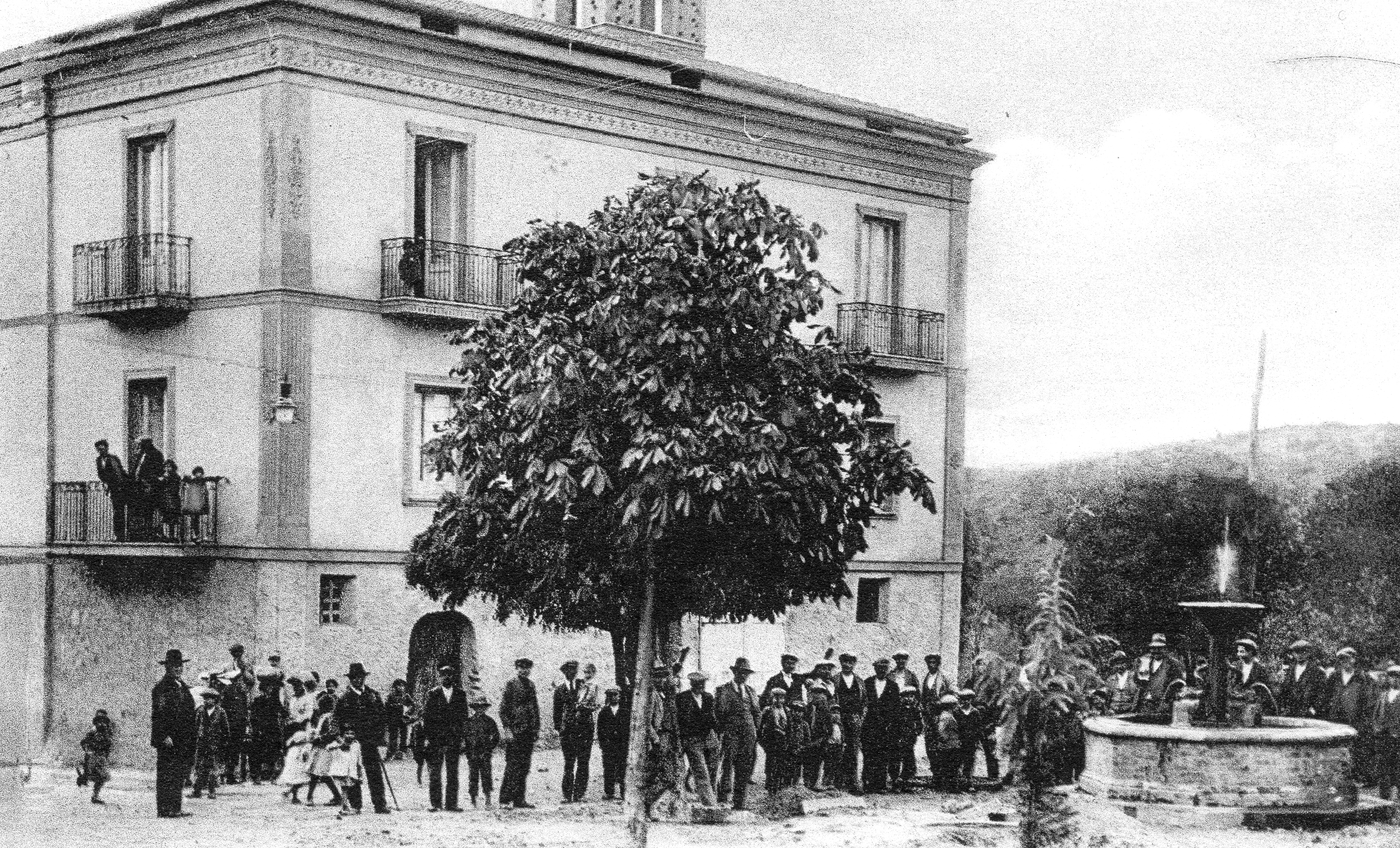
Gathering in front of the town hall (municipio) c. 1930s

When the Municipality of Ceraso began the reclamation of the Fabbrica area and provided for the listing of the hilly state-owned land, which had once belonged to the Badia di Pattano, in favor of poor families, it was in 1919, the villages of Petrosa and Metoio were born and developed.

Petrosa is the youngest of the hamlets, as it was elevated to a hamlet only on February 16, 1959, the name derives from the nature of its land.

== Geography ==
Ceraso has 6 hamlets (frazioni): Massascusa, Metoio, Petrosa, Santa Barbara, San Biase and San Sumino.
