= Berbara =

Berbara may refer to:

- Berbara, Akkar, Akkar District, Akkar Governorate, Lebanon
- Berbara, Byblos, Byblos District, Keserwan-Jbeil Governorate, Lebanon
