= Santa Barbara =

Santa Barbara or Santa Bárbara may refer to:

- Saint Barbara, an early Christian saint and martyr
- Santa Barbara, California, a city in the United States
  - Santa Barbara County, California

== Places ==
=== Argentina ===
- Santa Bárbara Department, Jujuy, Jujuy Province
- Santa Bárbara, Salta

=== Australia ===
- Santa Barbara, Queensland, a town in the City of Gold Coast
- Santa Barbara, New Farm, a heritage-listed villa in the City of Brisbane, Queensland

=== Brazil ===
- Santa Bárbara, Bahia
- Santa Bárbara, Minas Gerais
- Santa Bárbara d'Oeste, São Paulo
- Santa Bárbara do Leste, Minas Gerais
- Santa Bárbara do Monte Verde, Minas Gerais
- Santa Bárbara do Tugúrio, Minas Gerais

=== Cape Verde ===
- Santa Bárbara, Cape Verde

=== Chile ===
- Santa Bárbara, Chile

=== Colombia ===
- Santa Bárbara, Antioquia
- Santa Bárbara, Nariño
- Santa Bárbara de Pinto, Magdalena
- Santa Bárbara, Santander

=== Costa Rica ===
- Santa Bárbara (canton)
  - Santa Bárbara de Heredia

=== Cuba ===
- La Demajagua, Isle of Youth, founded as Santa Bárbara

=== Curaçao ===
- Santa Barbara, Curaçao
- Santa Barbara Beach, Curaçao

=== Dominican Republic ===
- Santa Bárbara de Samaná, Samaná (town)

=== Guatemala ===
- Santa Bárbara, Huehuetenango
- Santa Bárbara, Suchitepéquez

=== Honduras ===
- Santa Bárbara Department, Honduras
  - Santa Bárbara, Honduras

=== Italy ===
- Santa Barbara (Ceraso), Province of Salerno, Campania
- Santa Barbara, a subdivision of Muggia, Province of Trieste

=== Mexico ===
- Santa Bárbara, Chihuahua
  - Santa Bárbara Municipality
- Santa Bárbara, Durango
- Ocampo, Tamaulipas, founded as Santa Bárbara

=== Philippines ===
- Santa Barbara, Iloilo
- Santa Barbara, Pangasinan

=== Portugal ===
- Santa Bárbara (Angra do Heroísmo), Terceira, Azores
- Santa Bárbara (Ponta Delgada), São Miguel Island, Azores
- Santa Bárbara (Ribeira Grande), São Miguel Island, Azores
- Santa Bárbara (Vila do Porto), Santa Maria Island, Azores
- Manadas, once known as Santa Bárbara, Velas, São Jorge Island, Azores

=== Spain ===
- Santa Bàrbara, Tarragona, Montsià, Catalonia
- Santa Bárbara Castle, Alicante
- Playa de Santa Bárbara, a beach in La Línea de la Concepción

=== United States ===
- Santa Barbara, California
  - Santa Barbara County, California
  - Mission Santa Barbara
  - Presidio of Santa Barbara
  - University of California, Santa Barbara
- Santa Barbara Island, California
  - Santa Barbara Channel
- Santa Barbara National Forest, the former name of California's Los Padres National Forest
- Santa Barbara, New Mexico
- Santa Barbara station (PAAC) (closed), Bethel Park, Pennsylvania

=== Venezuela ===
- Santa Bárbara del Zulia
- Santa Bárbara, Ezequiel Zamora Municipality, Barinas

== Arts and entertainment ==
- Santa Barbara (TV series), a 1980s American soap opera
- Santa Bárbara (TV series), a 2015 Portuguese telenovela
- Santa Barbara (film), a 2014 South Korean film
- "Santa Bárbara bendita", a traditional song of the Asturian coal miners
- "Santa Barbara", a 1978 song by Ronnie Milsap, b-side of "Back on My Mind Again"
- Santa Barbara, a fictional nation, a setting of the novel Sard Harker

== Other uses ==
- Santa Barbara Airlines, a Venezuelan airline
- Santa Bárbara Sistemas, a Spanish defense contractor

== See also ==
- St. Barbara's Church (disambiguation)
