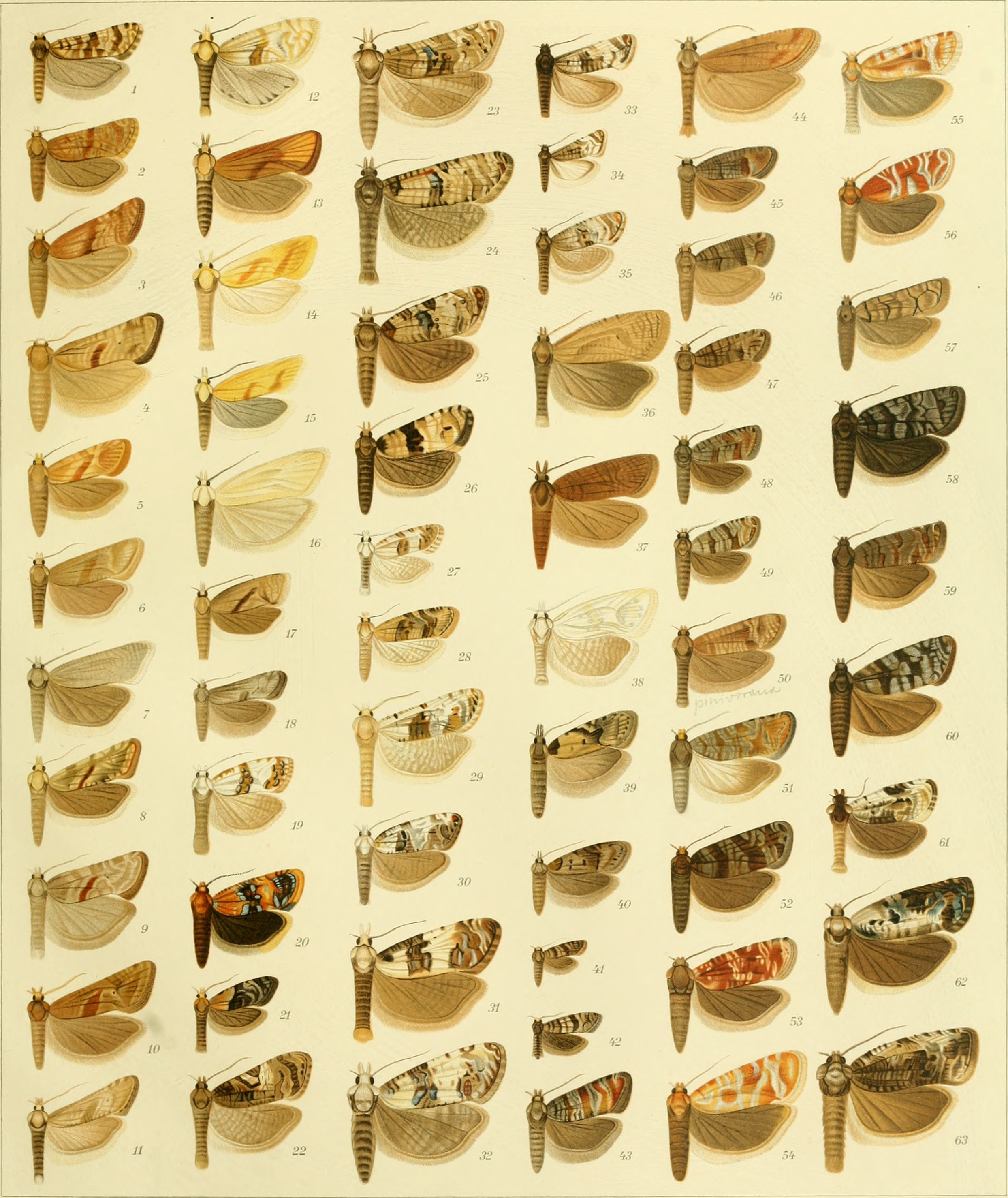
- Barbara herrichiana in Kennel Die palaearktischen tortriciden figures 58 female

Scientific classification
- Kingdom: Animalia
- Phylum: Arthropoda
- Class: Insecta
- Order: Lepidoptera
- Family: Tortricidae
- Genus: Barbara
- Species: B. herrichiana

Binomial name
- Barbara herrichiana Obraztsov, 1960

Synonyms
- Barbara margarotana

= Barbara herrichiana =

Species of moth

Barbara herrichiana is a moth of the family Tortricidae. It is found in central Europe, Spain, Greece and Ukraine.

The wingspan is 16–22 mm. Adults are on wing in April and May.
