= Saint Barbara Altarpiece =

The Saint Barbara Altarpiece may refer to:

- Saint Barbara Altarpiece (Master Francke), c. 1410
- Altarpiece of Saint Barbara (Pérez), c. 1410–1425
- Polyptych of Saint Barbara (Palma Vecchio), c. 1523–1524
