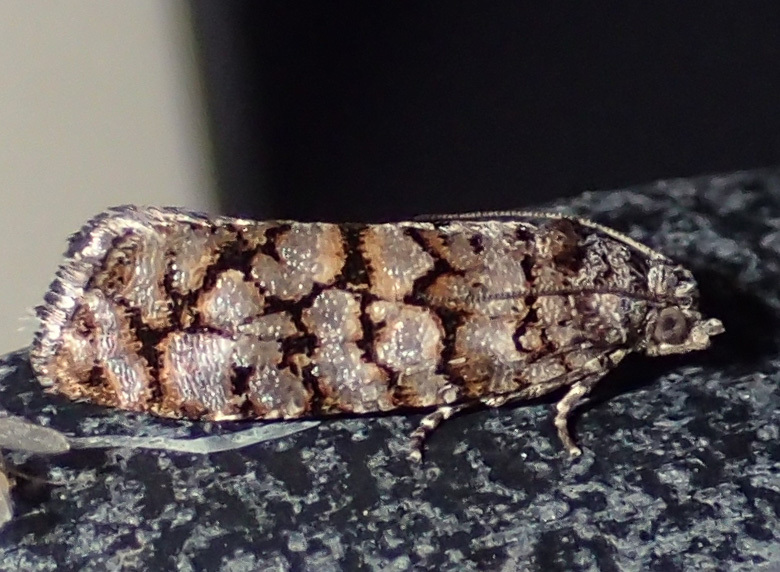
- Barbara mappana, New York

Scientific classification
- Kingdom: Animalia
- Phylum: Arthropoda
- Clade: Pancrustacea
- Class: Insecta
- Order: Lepidoptera
- Family: Tortricidae
- Genus: Barbara
- Species: B. mappana

Binomial name
- Barbara mappana Freeman, 1941

= Barbara mappana =

Species of moth

Barbara mappana is a species of moth in the family Tortricidae, found in North America. It has been reported on cones of white spruce, but is also considered to be of minor importance compared to other insect species which consume and potentially damage white spruce.
