= Caladenia barbarella =

Small dragon orchid

Conservation status
- Endangered (EPBC Act)

Scientific classification
- Kingdom: Plantae
- Clade: Tracheophytes
- Clade: Angiosperms
- Clade: Monocots
- Order: Asparagales
- Family: Orchidaceae
- Subfamily: Orchidoideae
- Tribe: Diurideae
- Genus: Caladenia
- Species: C. barbarella

Binomial name
- Caladenia barbarella Hopper & A.P.Br.

Species of orchid

Caladenia barbarella, commonly known as the small dragon orchid, is a plant in the orchid family Orchidaceae and is endemic to the south-west of Western Australia. It has a single broad, hairy leaf held close to the ground and a single greenish-yellow and red flower. It is only known from a small area near the Murchison River.

== Description ==
Caladenia barbarella is a terrestrial, perennial, deciduous, herb with an underground tuber and a single ground-hugging, broad, hairy leaf 3–8 cm (1–3 in) long and 3–7 mm (0.1–0.3 in) wide. The single flower is borne on a stem 8–25 cm (3–10 in) tall and is greenish-yellow with red stripes and 2 cm (0.8 in) wide and long. The lateral sepals and petals are short and hang downwards. The labellum is densely hairy and has a large dark red gland at its highest point. It also has many long purple hairs that are thought to attract pollinators. Flowering occurs in late August and September.

== Taxonomy and naming ==
Caladenia barbarella was first formally described by Stephen Hopper and Andrew Brown in 2001 from a specimen collected in the Cooloomia Nature Reserve near the Murchison river and the description was published in Nuytsia. The specific epithet (barbarella) is a diminutive form of the Latin word barba, hence meaning "a small beard", but also alludes to a comparison of the sexual deception of this orchid to its male insect pollinators, and the French comic-book character Barbarella.

== Distribution and habitat ==
Small dragon orchid is known from fourteen populations east and north-east of Kalbarri in the Geraldton Sandplains biogeographic region where it grows under low shrubs in areas that are inundated in winter.

== Conservation ==
Caladenia barbarella is classified as "Threatened Flora (Declared Rare Flora — Extant)" by the Western Australian Government Department of Parks and Wildlife and it has also been listed as "Endangered" (EN) under the Australian Government Environment Protection and Biodiversity Conservation Act 1999 (EPBC Act).
