= Lena Maria Gårdenäs =

Swedish actress and singer (1947–2026)

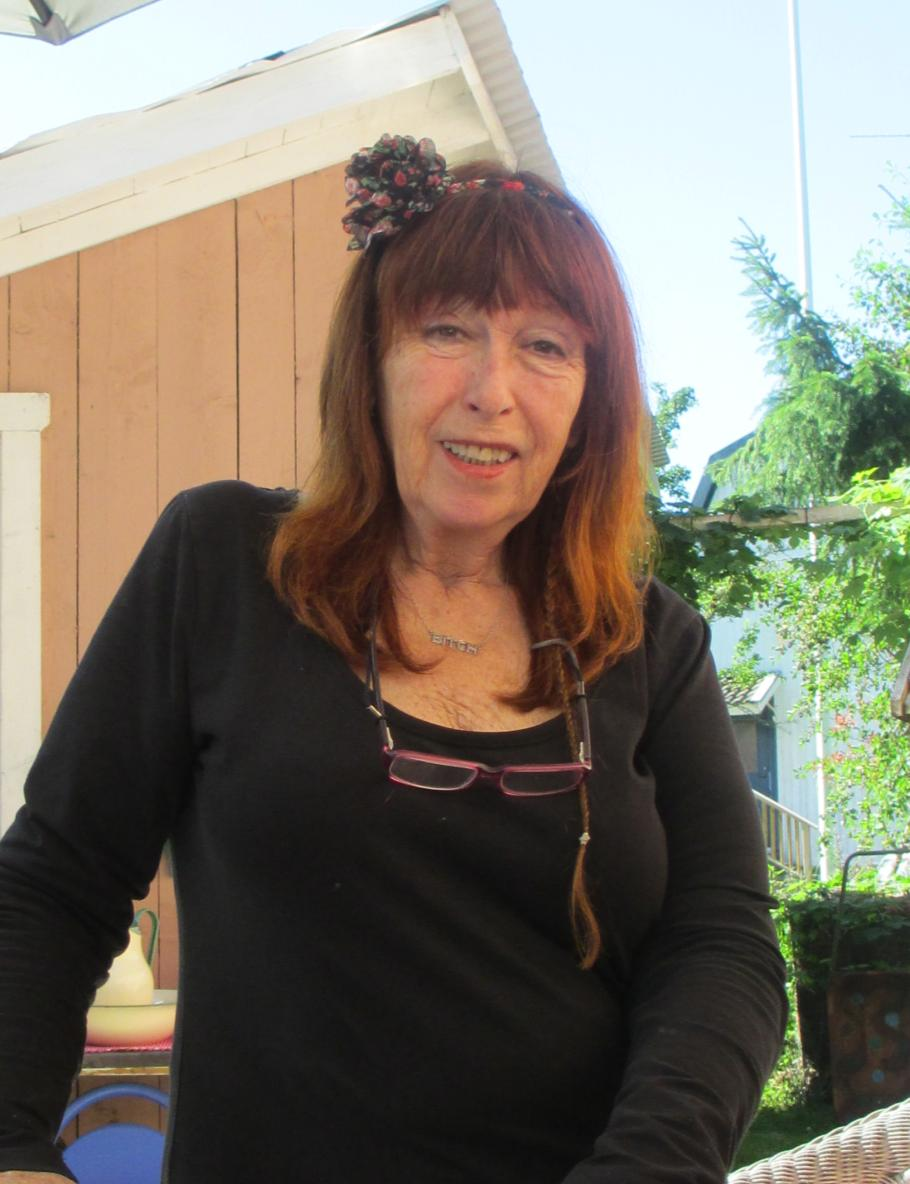
- Gårdenäs in 2015

Background information
- Born: Lena Maria Gårdenäs; 10 April 1947; Stockholm, Sweden
- Died: 21 April 2026 (aged 79)
- Occupations: Actress; singer
- Labels: Philips, Columbia, EMI, Polydor, Phonogram,
- Spouse(s): Dougie Lawton, Kenny Lindquist

Lena Maria Gårdenäs (previously Gårdenäs Lawton; 10 April 1947 – 21 April 2026) was a Swedish actress and singer.

== Background ==
Gårdenäs was born on 10 April 1947 in Brännkyrka a suburb of Stockholm, but at the age of five she moved to Helsingborg.

== Career ==
She started her career as the lead singer in the music group Rainy Day Women in 1966, and later sang in the group Lena Maria & Sweet Wine in the 1970s. The group Sweet Wine had recorded under their own name as well.

Sweet Wine recorded the single "All Alone" bw "Nelly Bourbon" which was released on the JF label.

A single by Sweet Wine, "Miss Lady", originally recorded by Buddy Miles backed with Sly & the Family Stone's "Dynamite" had been released on the Parlophone label in 1970.

In March 1972 Gårdenäs and Sweet Wine members, Erik Strandh on organ and piano, Dougie Lawton on guitar, Gert Sandin on bass and Lars Liljeryd on drums recorded an album in Studio Decebel. The producer was Håkan Sterner and Dougie Lawton handled the arrangements. The end result was the album Det Bästa Från Jesus Christ Superstar which was credited to Lena-Maria and Sweet Wine. Also that year, their recording "Michaels Mamma" ("Sylvia's Mother"), backed with "Jag Är Kvinna" ("I'm A Woman") was released on Polydor 2053.096.

Lena Maria & Sweet Wine would go on to have success with the 1973 single "Flyg din väg" aka "Hideaway" which was a hit on the Svensktoppen chart.

Along with the group Rockfolket she participated in a so called barshow at Bachu Wapen in 1978, and in the early 1980s she worked with Janne Loffe Carlsson in his show at Berns salonger in Stockholm. She also toured with Eva Rydberg, Janne Lucas and Jerry Williams in Sweden, and with ABBA on their tour around Europe and Australia in 1977. She was part of the movie ABBA: The Movie.

In 1979, Gårdenäs played the female lead in the movie Repmånad. She also acted in TV series like Skulden broadcast on SVT in 1982.

Between 1980 and 1981, she had her own show on SVT the Lena Maria Show, at the same time she released new music with the LPs Lena Maria och Lena Marias Nya.

== Death ==
Gårdenäs died on 21 April 2026, at the age of 79. Her ex-husband Dougie Lawton also died that year on 23 March.
