= Martin Mann =

German Schlager singer and songwriter (born 1944)

- Born: Mario Löprich; 10 March 1944 (age 82); Vienna, Austria
- Occupations: German Schlager singer and songwriter

Mario Löprich, better known by his stage name Martin Mann (born Vienna, 10 March 1944) is an Austrian-born German Schlager singer and songwriter. Mann had big success with the song "Meilenweit" ("Miles for miles") in 1971.

== Discography ==
Albums

- Live Im Studio (1971)
- Das Leben ist schön (1973)
- ... auf neuen Wegen (1977)
- Mann – er kommt! (1999)
- Meilenweit (compilation, 2002)

Singles

- Cecilia / Das ist die Ruhe vor dem Sturm (1970)
- Meilenweit / Das gewisse Etwas (1971)
- Die Brücke von San Francisco / Junge Liebe (1972)
- Heut' woll'n wir leben / Das Leben ist schön (1972)
- Bind ein blaues Band um unsern Birkenbaum / Reich mir die Hand (1973) ´
- Rab-Da-Da-Dab / Goodbye Marie (1973)
- Strohblumen (Sunflower) / Ich glaube dir (1977)
- Die Welt / Gegen das Gesetz (1979)
- Lass doch mal den Charly ran / Ein heisses Eisen (1980)
- Weil ich dich nicht liebe / Mach dir keine Sorgen (1991)
- Heut' woll'n wir leben / Das Leben ist schön
- Mädchen komm ganz nah an meine grüne Seite / Barbara
- Boogie Woogie / Wiederseh'n, Adios, Bye Bye (1981)
- Weil sie noch nicht mal 16 war / Des Rockers Leid (1977)
- Mädchen zieh deine Schuhe aus / Du kannst bei mir wohnen
- Küssen am hellichten Tag / Komm in die Stadt
- Ich will keine Braut, die mir meine Freiheit klaut / Zwischen 2 Feuern
- 1-1-8 / Die Stadt im Regen
- Mein Brief an Julie (Julie do you love me) / Mehr und mehr
- Ich bin bereit
