= St. Barbara's Church =

St Barbara's Church can refer to any one of the many churches dedicated to Saint Barbara:

== Anglican ==
=== United Kingdom ===
- St Barbara's Church, Ashton under Hill
- St Barbara's Church, Earlsdon
- St Barbara's Church, Haceby

== Coptic Orthodox ==
=== Egypt ===
- Saint Barbara Church in Coptic Cairo

== Orthodox ==
- St. Barbara's Church, Constantinopel, destroyed orthodox church in Constantinopel

== Roman Catholic ==
=== Andorra ===
- Església de Santa Bàrbara d'Ordino

=== Belarus ===
- Church of St. Barbara, Vitebsk

=== Czech Republic ===
- St. Barbara's Church, Kutná Hora

=== Georgia ===
- St Barbara's Church, Tkemlana

=== Ghana ===
- St. Barbara Catholic Church

=== Italy ===
- Basilica palatina di Santa Barbara, Mantua
- Santa Barbara dei Librai, Rome
- Santa Barbara, Turin

=== Malta ===
- Church of Saint Barbara, Valletta

=== Mexico ===
- Iglesia de Santa Bárbara (Santa Rosalía)

=== Namibia ===
- St. Barbara Catholic Church (Namibia)

=== Philippines ===
- Santa Barbara Church, Santa Barbara, Iloilo

=== Poland ===
- St. Barbara's Church, Warsaw

=== Portugal ===
- Church of Santa Bárbara (Vila do Porto)
- Church of Santa Bárbara (Horta)

=== Spain ===
- Santa Bárbara, Madrid

=== Ukraine ===
- St. Barbara's Church, Berdychiv

=== United States ===
- Mission Santa Barbara
- St. Barbara's Church (Brooklyn), New York
- St. Barbara Church (Chicago)
