= Barbara (moth) =

Scientific classification
- Domain: Eukaryota
- Kingdom: Animalia
- Phylum: Arthropoda
- Class: Insecta
- Order: Lepidoptera
- Family: Tortricidae
- Tribe: Endotheniini
- Genus: Barbara; Heinrich, 1923

Genus of tortrix moths

Barbara is a genus of moths belonging to the subfamily Olethreutinae of the family Tortricidae.

== Species ==
- Barbara colfaxiana (Kearfott, 1907)
- Barbara fulgens Kuznetzov, 1969
- Barbara herrichiana Obraztsov, 1960
- Barbara mappana Freeman, 1941

== See also ==
- List of Tortricidae genera
