= Santa Barbara, Ceraso =

Santa Barbara
- Frazione
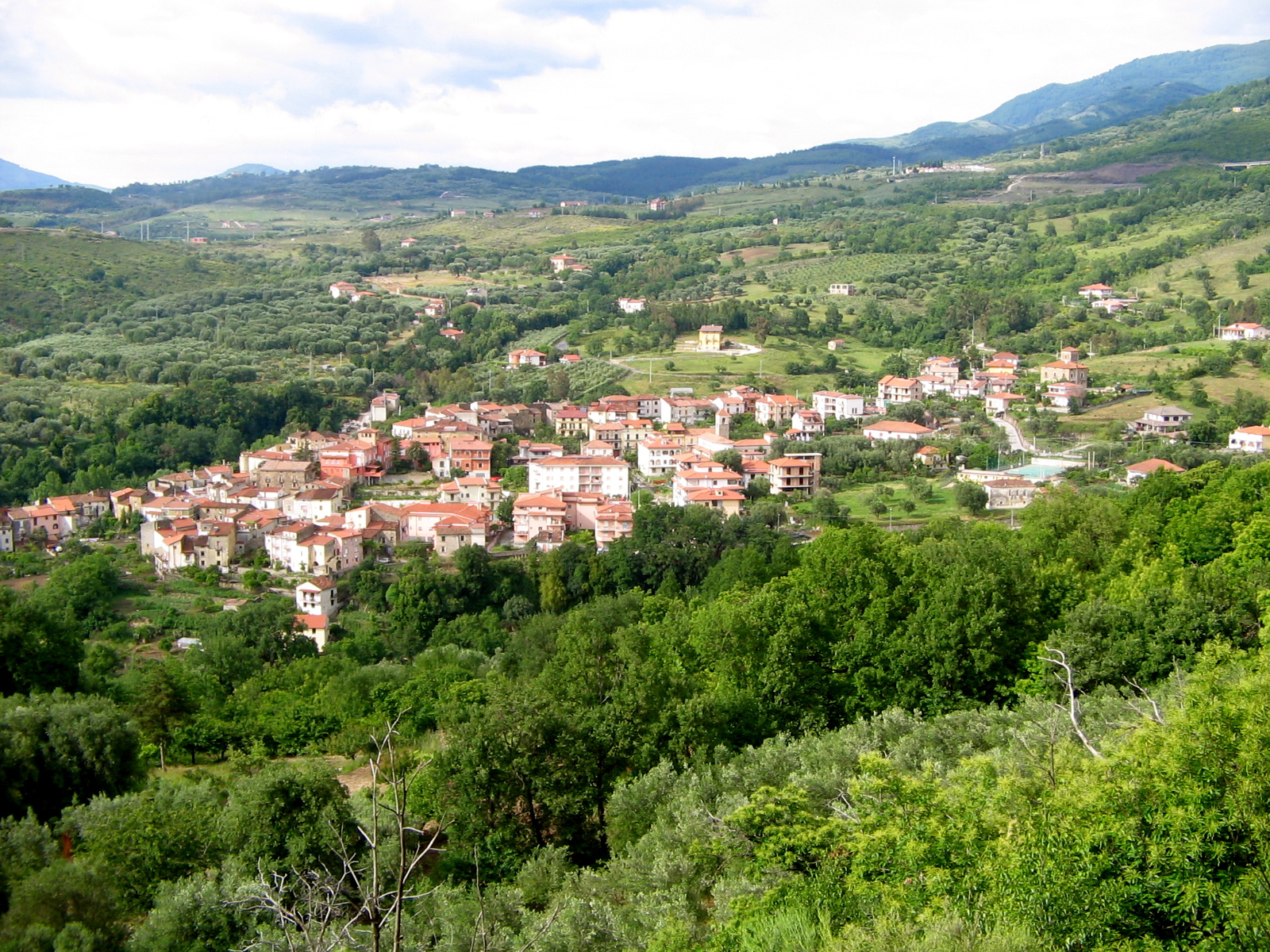

- Location of Santa Barbara in Italy
- Coordinates: 40°10′46.09″N 15°15′24.04″E
- Country: Italy
- Region: Campania
- Province: Salerno (SA)
- Comune: Ceraso
- Elevation: 275 m (902 ft)

Population (2005)
  - Total: 1,000
- Demonym: Barbaresi
- Time zone: UTC+1 (CET)
  - Summer (DST): UTC+2 (CEST)
- Postal code: 84052
- Dialing code: 0974
- Website: Municipal website

Santa Barbara is an Italian village and hamlet (frazione) of the commune of Ceraso in the Province of Salerno, Campania. It has a population of roughly a thousand.

== History ==
The village was founded around the year 1005. It counts a little castle, ancient seat of the local marquesses Ferolla.

== Geography ==
Santa Barbara is located in the middle of Cilento and transcluded into its national park, 3 km south of Ceraso, on the provincial road from Vallo della Lucania to Ascea, and nearby the green area of Gelbison mountain. It counts a little locality named Isca nearby the little river Fiumarella.

The village is 7 km far from Vallo della Lucania, 16 from Ascea, 18 from Velia, and almost 80 from Salerno. Nearby the town of Ceraso there is an exit of a modern carriageway, rapid variation on national road SS 18, which runs from Salerno to Sapri through Battipaglia, Paestum, Agropoli, Vallo della Lucania, Centola and Policastro.

== See also ==
- Cilento
- Cilentan dialect
- Cilento and Vallo di Diano National Park
