= Saint Barbara Altarpiece (Master Francke) =

Altarpiece by the Master Francke

Barbara altar
- Pyhän Barbaran alttarikaappi (Finnish)
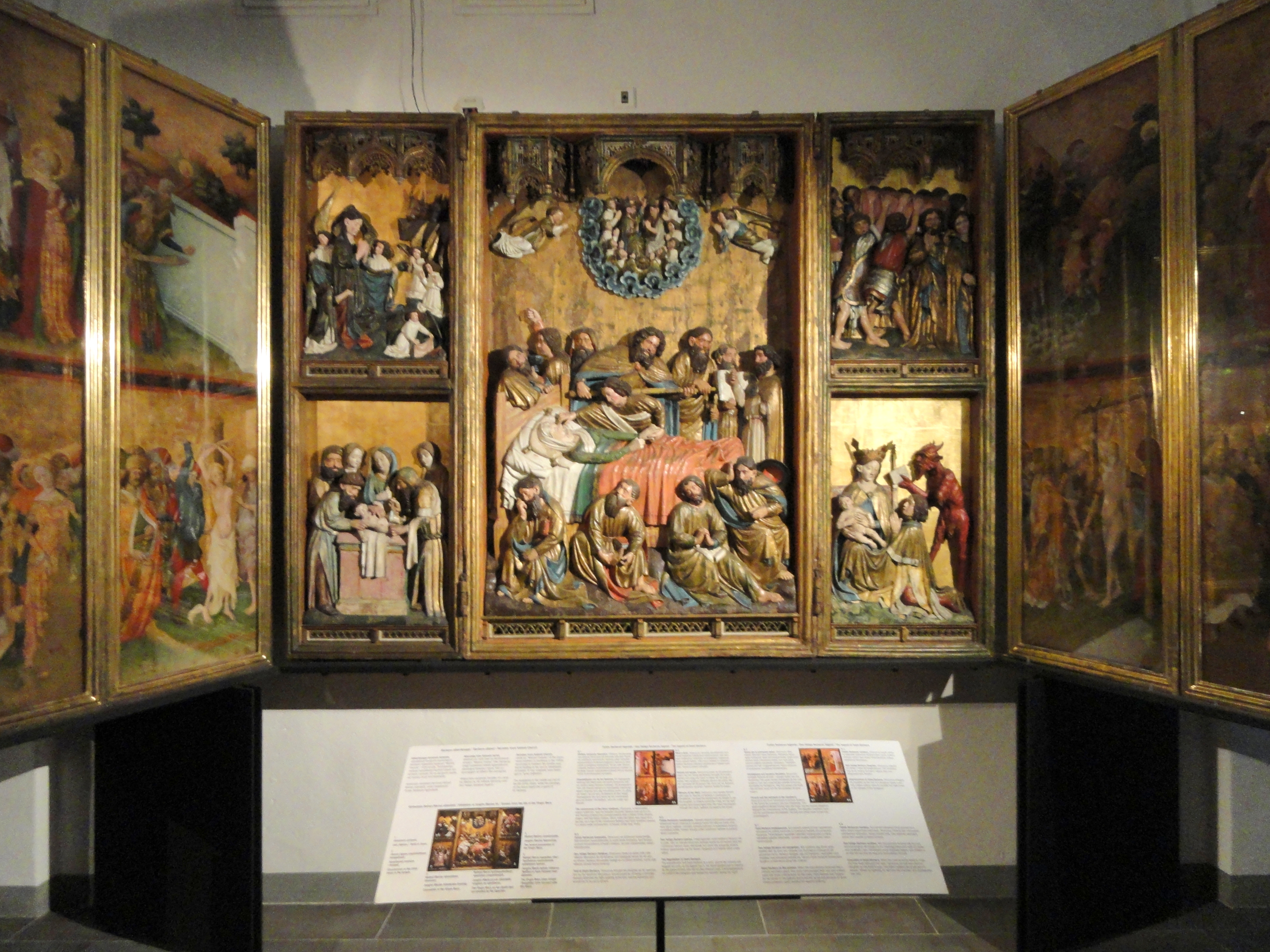
- Artist: Master Francke
- Year: c. 1410
- Medium: Tempera on wood
- Dimensions: 200 cm × 260 cm (79 in × 100 in)
- Location: National Museum of Finland, Helsinki; 60°10′30″N 24°55′55″E

The Saint Barbara Altarpiece is a medieval altarpiece attributed to Master Francke. Its known provenance starts at the medieval church in Kalanti in Southwest Finland where it stood until 1883. According to local oral tradition that was collected in the 19th century, the altarpiece was found floating in the sea outside Kalanti. The altarpiece is now located at the National Museum of Finland.

The altarpiece is best known for the paintings depicting the legend of Saint Barbara on the outside of its inner wings.

== Gallery ==
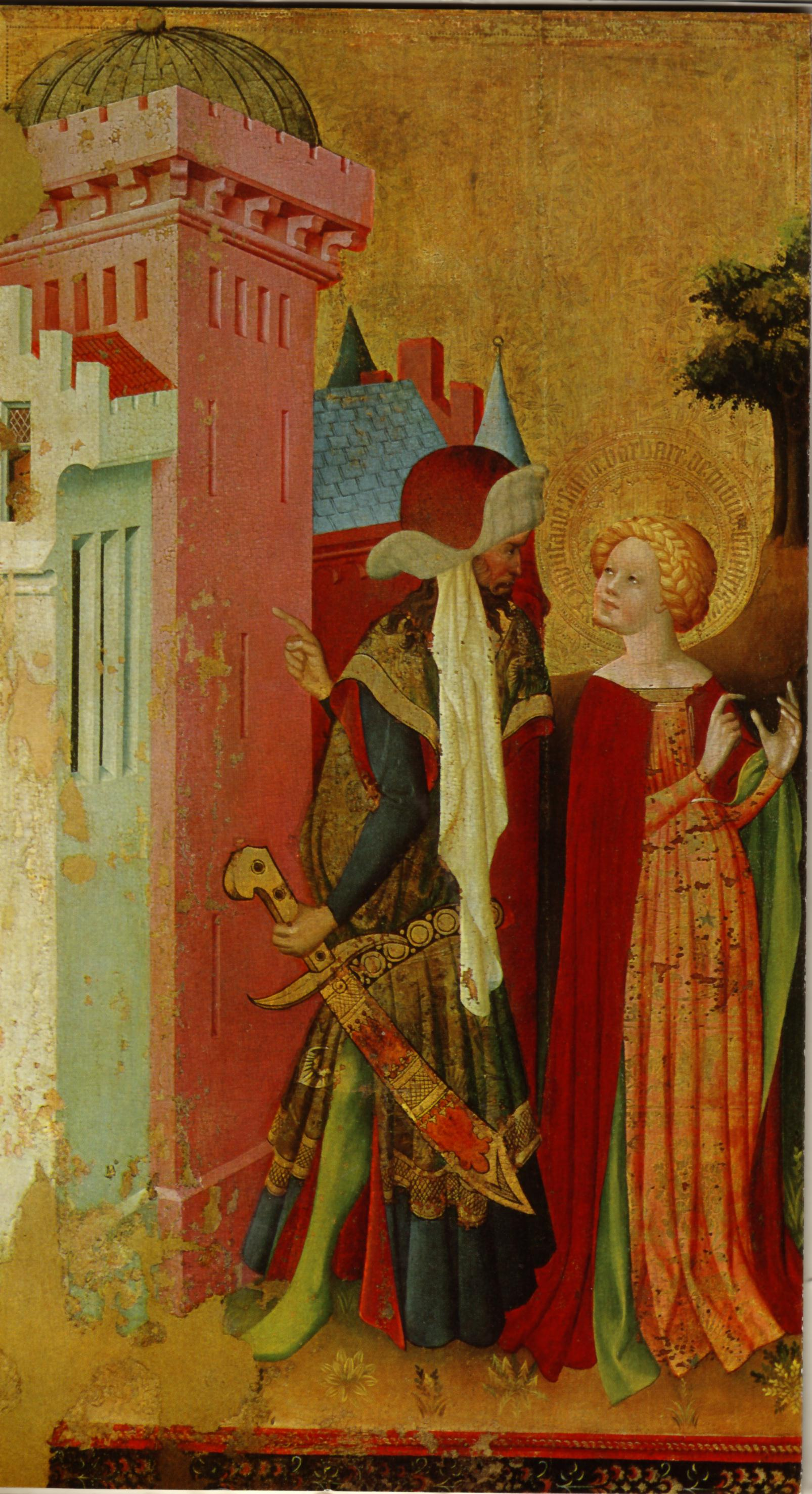

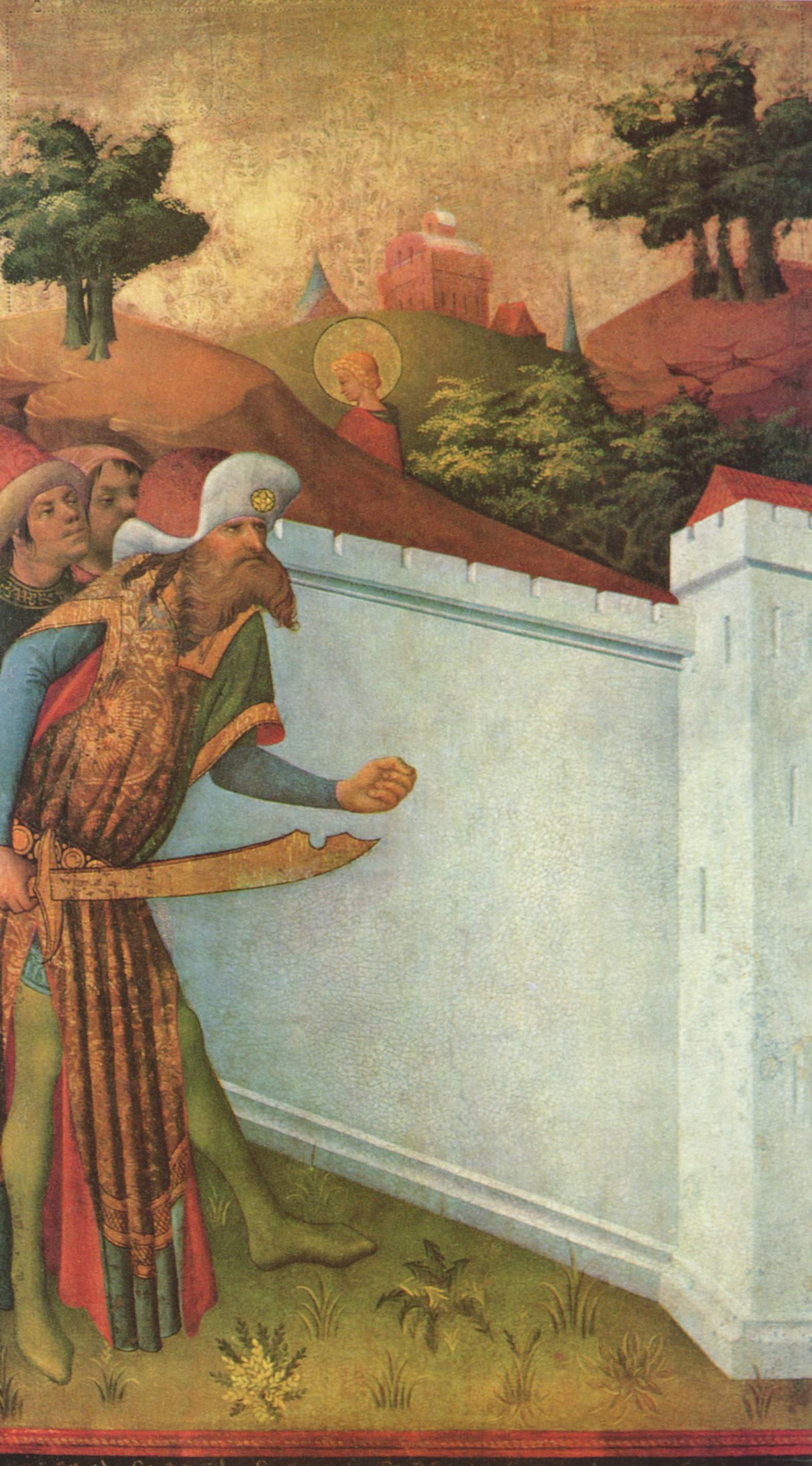

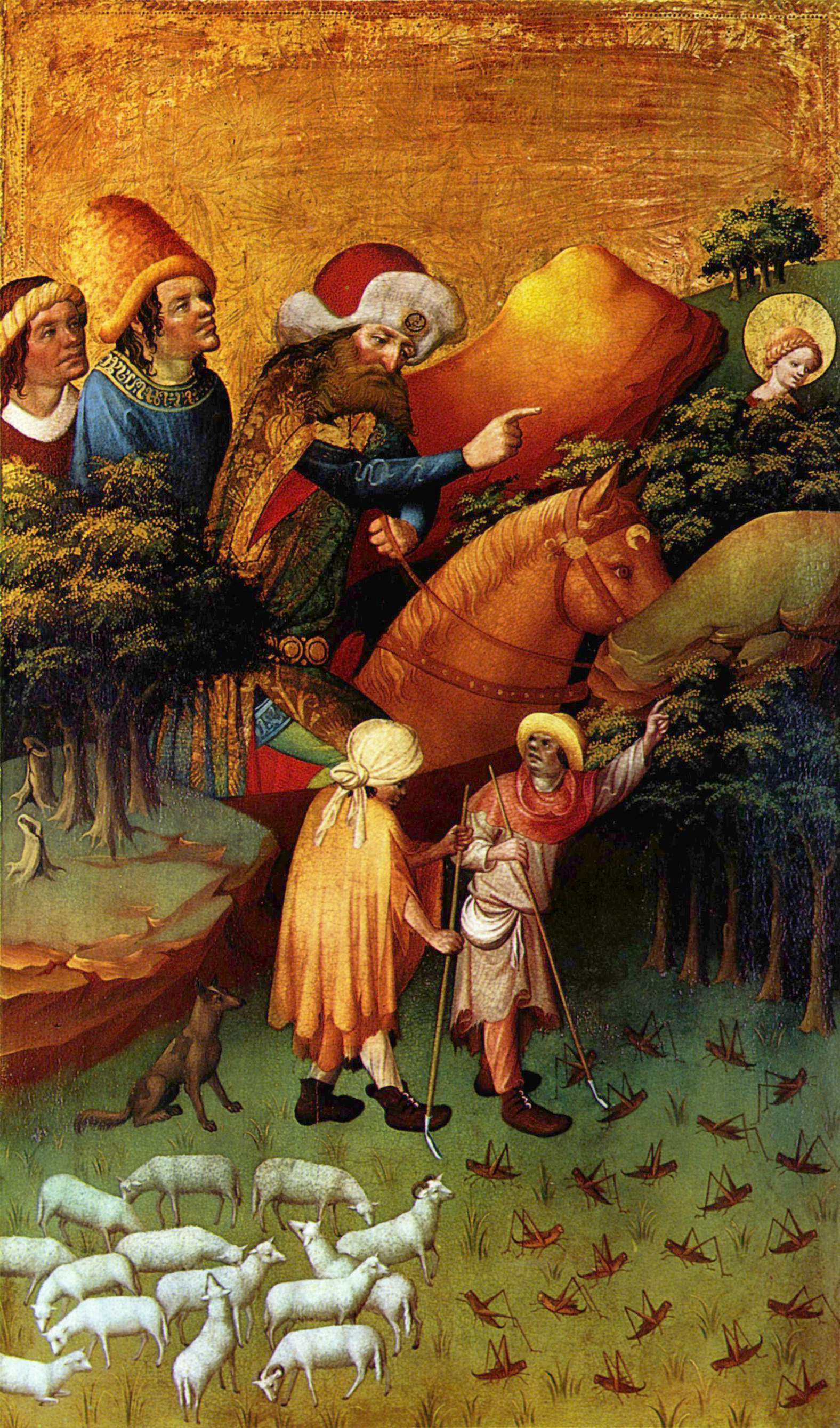

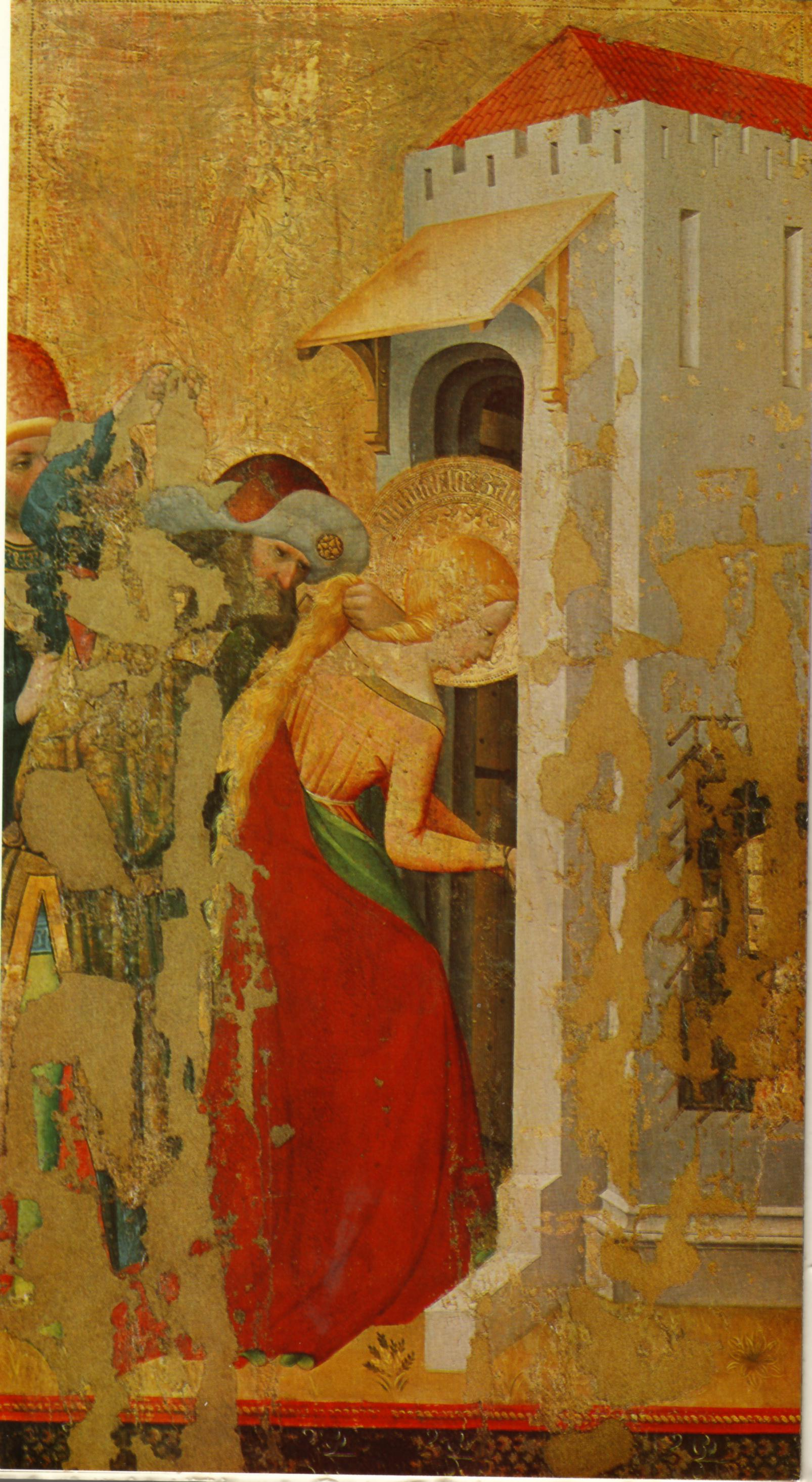

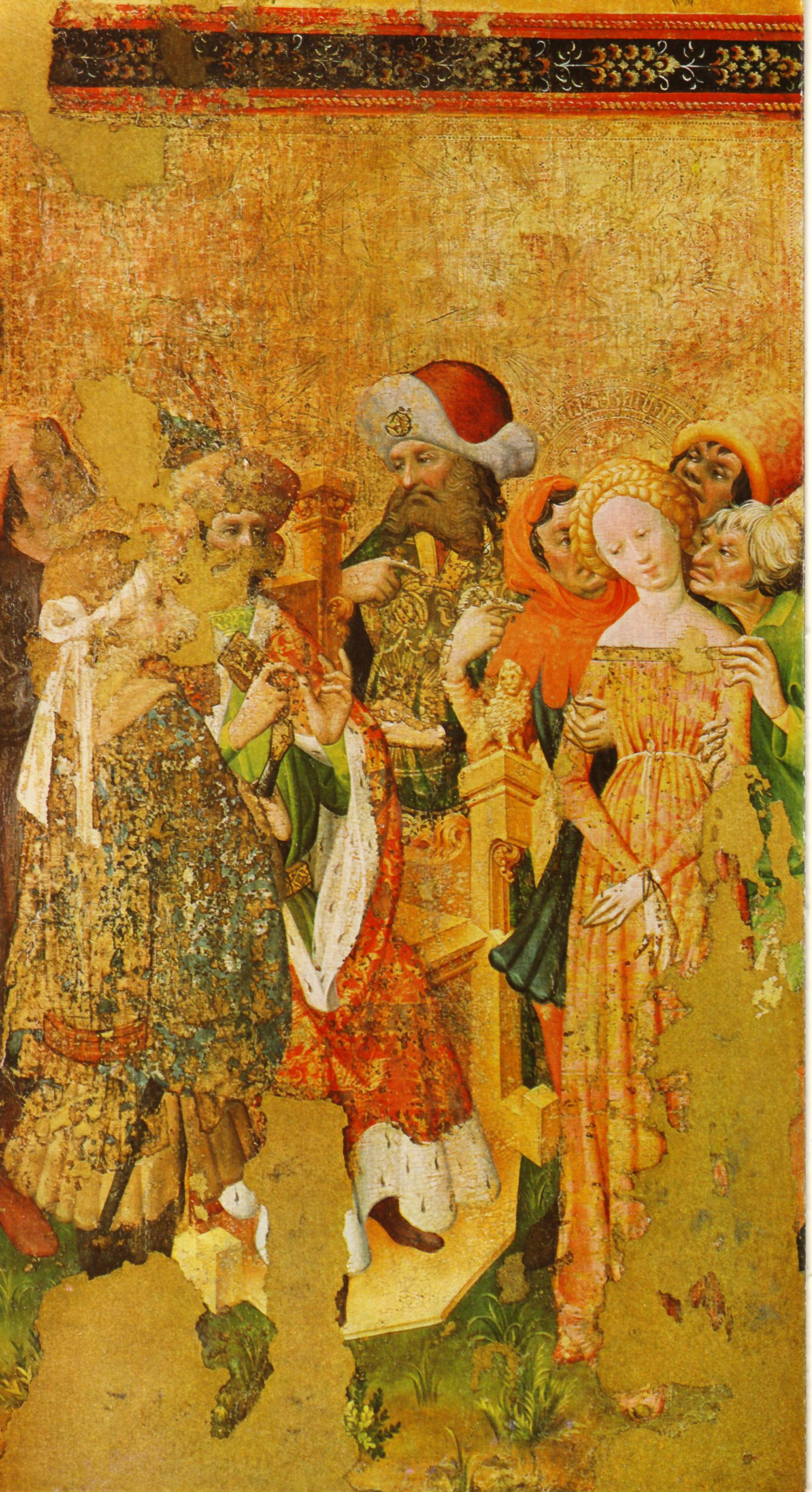

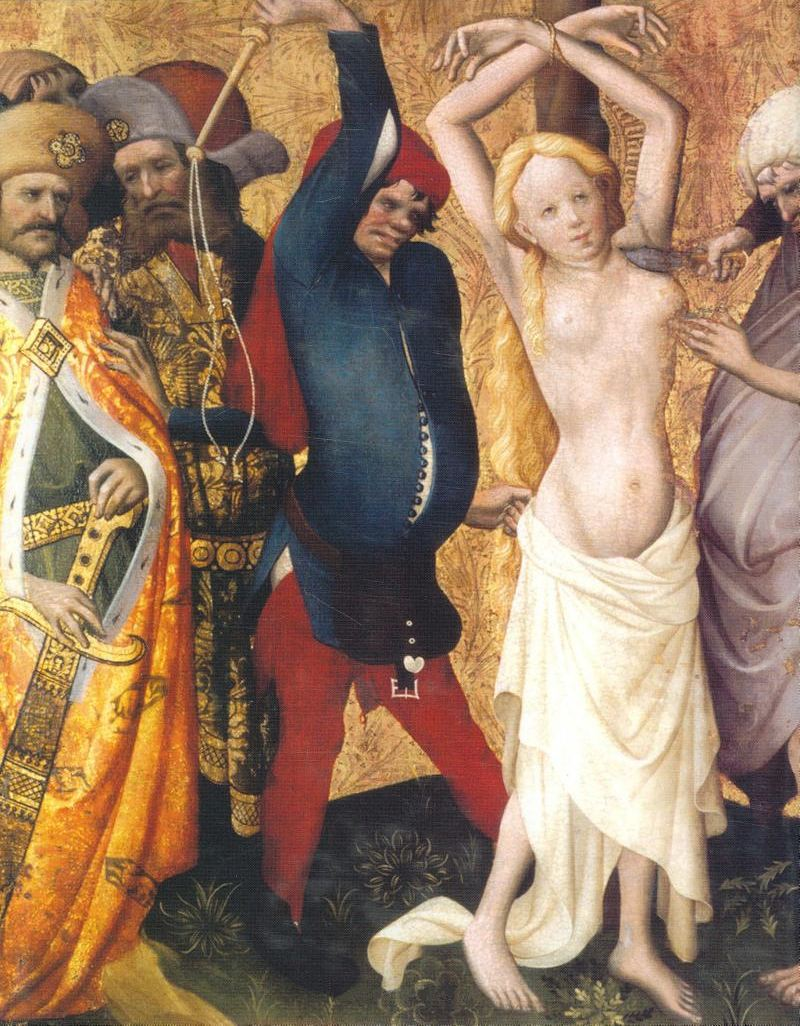

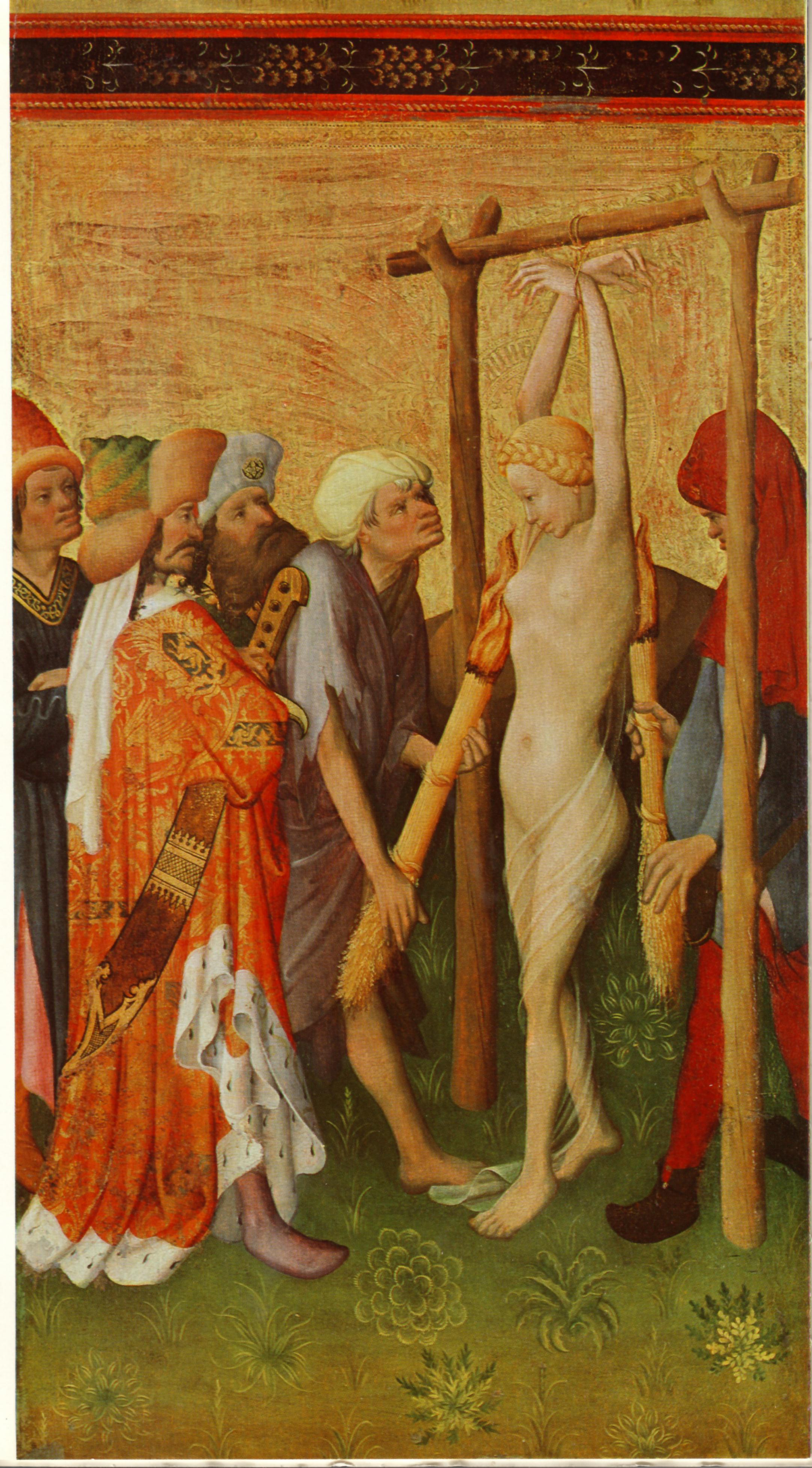

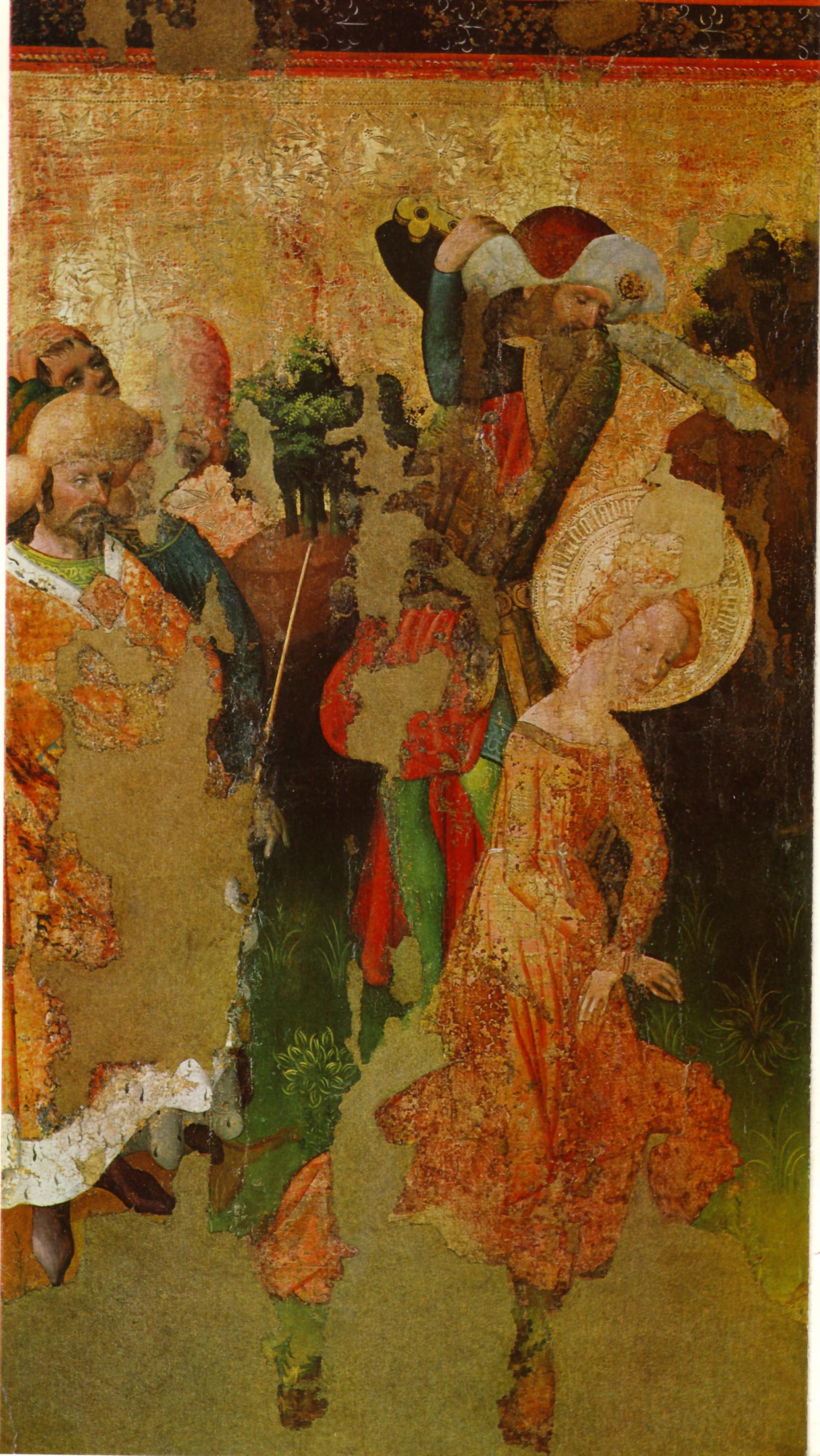
