= St Barbara's Church, Tkemlana =

Tkemlana St Barbara Church
- Tkemlana St Barbara Church
- Tkemlana St Barbara Church
- 41.70340521483883°N 43.16542599712216°E
- Location: Tkemlana, Akhaltsikhe Municipality, Samtskhe-Javakheti
- Country: Georgia
- Denomination: Georgian Orthodox Church

History
- Status: Active
- Dedication: Saint Barbara

Architecture
- Functional status: Active
- Architectural type: Church
- Style: Georgian ecclesiastical architecture
- Years built: 20th century

Specifications
- Materials: Local stone

Tkemlana St Barbara Church is a Georgian Orthodox Church located in the village of Tkemlana, Akhaltsikhe Municipality, in the Samtskhe-Javakheti region of Georgia.

The church is situated at an altitude of approximately 1,010 metres above sea level. It is built of local stone and follows the traditions of Georgian medieval ecclesiastical architecture.
