= Barbara, Arkansas =

- Historical unincorporated community (Ghost town)
- Barbara's position in Arkansas.
- Coordinates: 36°5′30″N 94°9′43″W
- Country: United States
- State: Arkansas
- County: Washington
- Township: Fayetteville
- Elevation: 1,263 ft (385 m)
- Time zone: UTC-6 (Central (CST))
  - Summer (DST): UTC-5 (CDT)
- ZIP code: 72703
- Area code: 479
- GNIS feature ID: 65282

Barbara was an unincorporated community in Fayetteville Township, Washington County, Arkansas, United States. It was annexed by Fayetteville in 1967. It is located on the Frisco Railway and Gregg Avenue in Fayetteville.
