= Barbarella (band) =

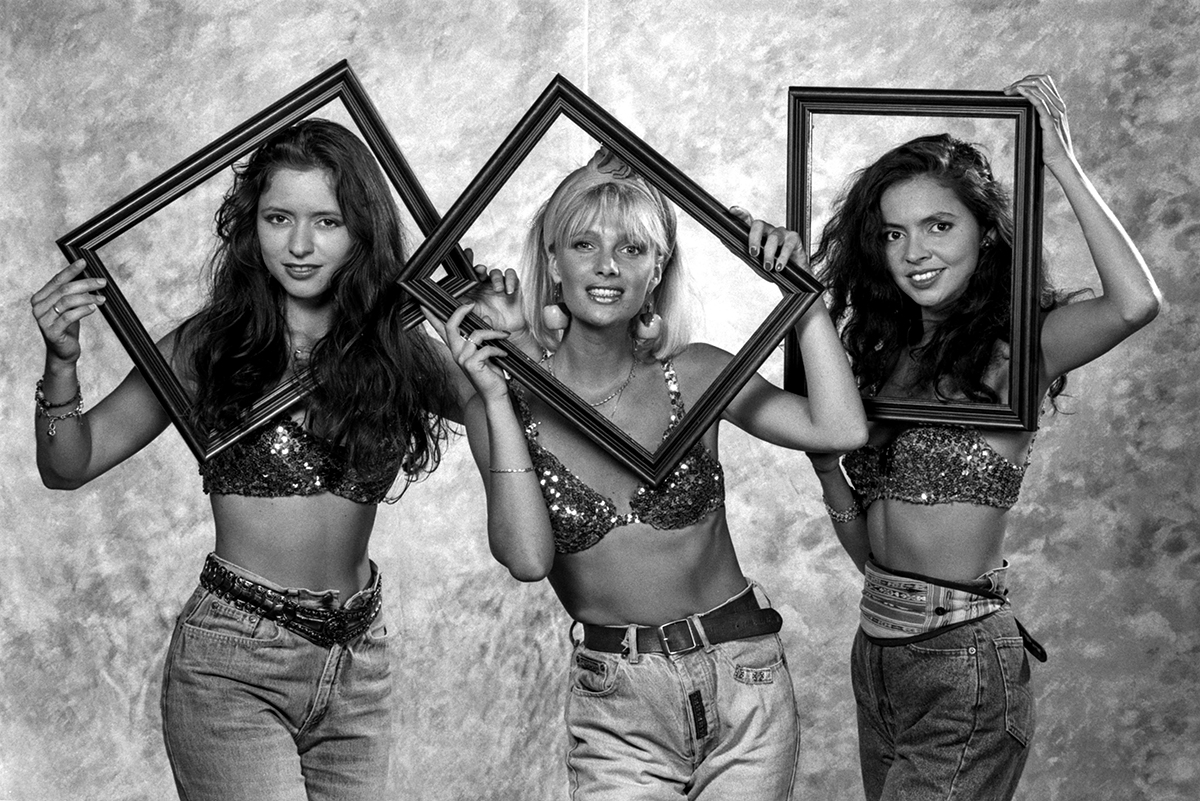

Barbarella was a Dutch all-female dance/pop trio from the Netherlands formed by Dutch manager/producer Han Meijer. The group consisted of singers Angela Vermeer, Ingrid Brans and Leslie Doornik. They released two albums in their short-lived career during 1989–1991 – Sucker For Your Love and Don't Stop The Dance.

They first came to prominence performing in the Dutch TV show, The Pin Up Club, around 1988/1989, eventually recording and releasing what was to become its theme song, "We Cheer You Up (Join The Pin Up Club)", a cheerful uptempo pop song in the Euro disco vein of that time. The song quickly became a hit in the Top 10 in their native Netherlands and gathered some momentum and interest around the continent. The infamous video, which featured topless female dancing, was also aired frequently in the UK on the now defunct music video request channel, Lifestyle Satellite Jukebox, in 1991–1992.

A debut album consisting of a few original tracks, covers and remixes the title track "Sucker For Your Love", that was a cover version of Toto Coelo's song "Dracula's Tango", and also including a version of "Summer in the City", followed around late 1989/early 1990. It yielded further singles in "(Like A) Fata Morgana", and the title track "Sucker For Your Love". However, apart from becoming minor hits in the Netherlands and Finland where their debut album went gold, they were not an international breakthrough.

A year later at the time of their second album Don't Stop The Dance, the line-up had changed slightly. However, while rave and contemporary rhythm and blues were all the rage across the European charts, Barbarella had done nothing to update their simple, melodic 1980s flavoured Euro disco, and despite the catchy title track lead single, the project flopped and was abandoned, with the girls going their separate ways.
