= HMS Barbara =

HMS Barbara has been the name of more than one ship of the British Royal Navy, and may refer to:

- HMS Barbara (1796), a 14-gun schooner purchased in 1796 and known to be in service in 1801
- HMS Barbara (1806), a 10-gun schooner launched in 1806, in French hands as privateer Pératy 1807–1808 before returning to British service, and was sold in 1815.
