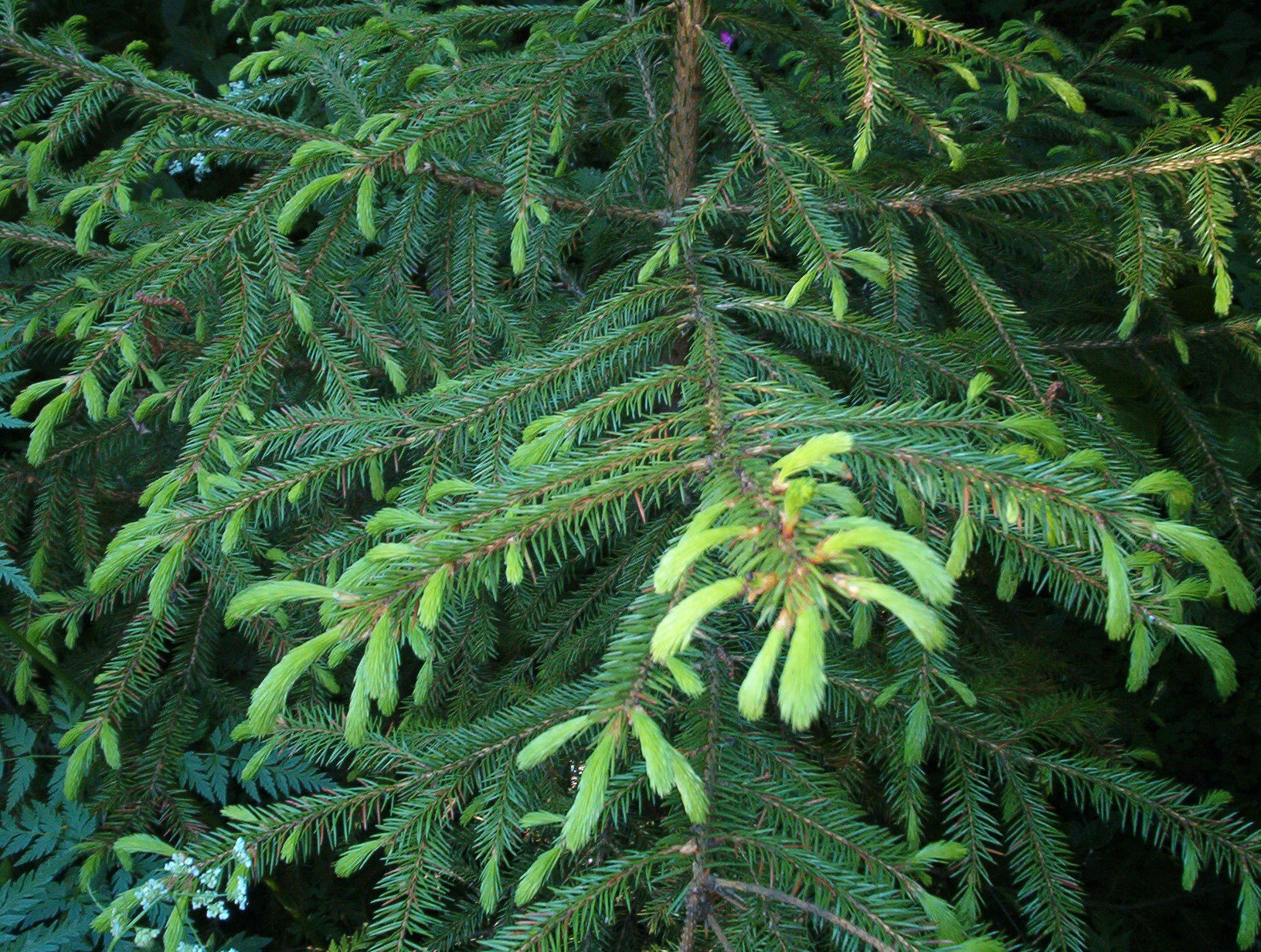
- Young Korean spruce

Conservation status
- Least Concern (IUCN 3.1)

Scientific classification
- Kingdom: Plantae
- Clade: Tracheophytes
- Clade: Gymnospermae
- Division: Pinophyta
- Class: Pinopsida
- Order: Pinales
- Family: Pinaceae
- Genus: Picea
- Species: P. koraiensis

Binomial name
- Picea koraiensis Nakai

Synonyms
- Picea koyamae var. koraiensis (Nakai) Liou & Z.Wang; Picea koraiensis var. tonaiensis (Nakai) T.Lee; Picea pungsanensis var. intercedens (Nakai) T.Lee; Picea koraiensis var. intercedens (Nakai) S.L.Tung & Y.L.Chou; Picea koraiensis var. intercedens (Nakai) Y.L.Chou; Picea koraiensis var. nenjiangensis S.Q.Nie & X.Y.Yuan

= Picea koraiensis =

Korean spruce

Species of conifer

Picea koraiensis, commonly known as Korean spruce, jong-bi-na-mu (Korean: 종비나무), hong pi yun shan (Chinese: 红皮云杉), or jel koreiskaya (Russian: ель корейская), is a species of spruce native to China, Russia, and North Korea.

It is a medium-sized evergreen tree growing to 30 m tall, and with a trunk diameter of up to 0.8 m. The shoots are orange-brown, glabrous or with scattered pubescence. The leaves are needle-like, 12–22 mm long, rhombic in cross-section, dark bluish-green with conspicuous stomatal lines. The cones are cylindric-conic, 4–8 cm long and 2 cm broad, maturing pale brown 5–7 months after pollination, and have stiff, smoothly rounded scales.

Its population is stable though low, and there are no known protocols that protect it. It is found mostly in the northern Korean Peninsula near the Yalu River, and in Siberia near the Ussuri River. In China, it is restricted north-eastern provinces Heilongjiang, Jilin, and Liaoning. It is also believed that it might possibly occur in areas in southern Ussuriland.

It is closely related to Koyama's spruce (Picea koyamae), and treated as synonymous with it by some botanists.
