= USS Barbara =

United States Navy patrol vessel in commission from 1917 to 1918

History

United States
- Name: USS Barbara
- Namesake: Previous name retained
- Builder: H. H. Linnell, Dorchester, Massachusetts
- Completed: 1910
- Acquired: 11 June 1917
- Commissioned: 21 June 1917
- Decommissioned: June 1918
- Stricken: 10 January 1919
- Fate: Returned to owner 10 January 1919
- Notes: Operated as private motorboat Barbara 1910-1917 and from 1919

General characteristics
- Type: Patrol vessel
- Tonnage: 15 Gross register tons
- Length: 42 ft (13 m)
- Beam: 10 ft 6 in (3.20 m)
- Draft: 3 ft 10 in (1.17 m) aft
- Speed: 8.5 knots
- Complement: 6
- Armament: 1 × 1-pounder gun; 1 × machine gun

USS Barbara (SP-704) was a United States Navy patrol vessel in commission from 1917 to 1918.

Barbara was built as a private motorboat of the same name in 1910 by H. H. Linnell at Dorchester, Massachusetts. On 11 June 1917, the U.S. Navy acquired her under a free lease from her owner, Arnold Hoffman of Barrington, Rhode Island, for use as a section patrol boat during World War I. She was commissioned as USS Barbara (SP-704) on 21 June 1917.

Assigned to the section patrol in the waters around New London, Connecticut, Barbara served as a cargo and dispatch boat for the next year.

Barbara was decommissioned in June 1918. She was returned to Hoffman on 10 January 1919 and stricken from the Navy Directory the same day.
