= Berbara, Akkar =

Village in Akkar District, Lebanon

Berbara (Aakkar) برباره (عكار)
- village
- Location within Lebanon
- Coordinates: 34°34′22″N 36°11′18″E
- Country: Lebanon
- Governorate: Akkar
- District: Akkar

Area
  - Total: 1.15 km^{2} (0.44 sq mi)
- Elevation: 400 m (1,300 ft)

Population (2009)
  - Total: 203 eligible voters
  - Density: 177/km^{2} (457/sq mi)
- Time zone: UTC+2 (EET)
  - Summer (DST): UTC+3 (EEST)
- Dialing code: +961

Berbara (Aakkar) (Arabic: برباره (عكار), romanized: Berbāra (ʿAkkār)) is a village in Akkar Governorate, Lebanon.

The population is mostly Alawite.

== History ==
In 1838, Eli Smith noted the village as Burbarah, located east of esh-Sheikh Mohammed. The inhabitants were Alawites.

== Bibliography ==
- Robinson, E.; Smith, E. (1841). Biblical Researches in Palestine, Mount Sinai and Arabia Petraea: A Journal of Travels in the year 1838. Vol. 3. Boston: Crocker & Brewster.
