= Bombino =

Bombino may refer to:

- Bombino bianco, an Italian wine grape variety grown in Apulia
- Bombino nero, an Italian wine grape variety grown in Apulia, Basilicata, Lazio, and Sardinia
- Bombino (musician), Nigerien singer-songwriter and guitarist

== See also ==
- Bambino (disambiguation)
