= Bambino =

Bambino is the Italian masculine form for "child". The feminine is bambina. The plural forms are bambinos in English and bambini in Italian. These words can refer to:

== Sports ==
- Babe Ruth (1895–1948), Hall-of-Fame Major League Baseball player nicknamed "the Bambino"
- Héctor Veira (born 1946), Argentine retired footballer and manager
- The "Curse of the Bambino", a superstition regarding the Boston Red Sox baseball team
- Gianluca Lapadula, an Italian-Peruvian footballer

== Arts and entertainment ==
=== Music ===
- "Bambino", first hit song by Dalida, which holds record for longest time spent on number 1 chart position, a total of 45 weeks.
- Héctor el Father or "Hector El Bambino", Puerto Rican former reggaeton recording artist and producer Héctor Delgado Román (born 1978)
- Tito El Bambino (born 1981), Puerto Rican singer
- "Bambina" (Idoli song)
- "Bambino (Napoli Lullaby)", a song recorded by The Springfields
- "Bambina", a song in Nue (Lara Fabian album)
- Nickname given to the singing and rapping duo Bars and Melody's fans

=== Other ===
- Bambino, Bud Spencer's character in the film They Call Me Trinity and in the sequel Trinity Is Still My Name
- Bambino, a male character in The Bridge, a 1969 Yugoslav war film
- Bambino!, a Japanese manga
- "Bambina," the nickname given in the anime La storia della Arcana Famiglia to Felicita
- "Orient Bambino", a line of automatic wrist watches by Japanese manufacturer "Orient Watch"
- "Hello Bambinos", was the greeting used by patriarch Martin Goodman (Paul Ritter) towards his sons in Friday Night Dinner

== Wine grapes ==
- Bambino (grape), another name for the Italian wine grape Bombino bianco
  - Bombino nero, another wine grape that is also known as Bambino
  - Cesanese Comune, another wine grape that is also known as Bambino

== Other uses ==
- Il Bambino, the name given in art to the image of the infant Jesus
- Bambino cat, an experimental crossbreed of domestic cat
- Fiat 500, known in Australia as "Bambino"
- Bambino (ice-cream), Polish

== See also ==
- Bimbo, from the Italian for a (male) baby or young child
