= Brindisi (disambiguation) =

Brindisi is a city of Apulia, southern Italy.

Brindisi, meaning "toast (honor)" in Italian, may also refer to:

== Places ==
- Brindisi Montagna, an Italian municipality of Basilicata
- Province of Brindisi, an Italian province of Apulia

== People ==
- Anthony Brindisi, American politician
- Lawrence of Brindisi (1559–1619), Roman Catholic saint
- Leucius of Brindisi (?–180), Roman Catholic saint
- Margaritus of Brindisi (1149–1197), Great Admiral of Sicily during the Third Crusade
- Miguel Ángel Brindisi (born 1950), Argentine footballer
- Remo Brindisi (1918–1996), Italian painter
- Rodolfo Brindisi (1932–2009), Argentine actor

== Other ==
- Brindisi (music), a musical term
- Brindisi Rosso, an Italian wine of Apulia
- New Basket Brindisi, an Italian basketball team based in the town of Brindisi
- SSD Brindisi FC, an Italian football team based in the town of Brindisi
- SMS Helgoland (1912), a ship renamed Brindisi in 1920
