= Susumaniello =

Variety of grape

- Grape (Vitis)
- Color of berry skin: Noir
- Species: Vitis vinifera
- Also called: (see below)
- Origin: Italy
- VIVC number: 12110

Susumaniello is an ancient variety of red wine grape grown in the province of Brindisi, Salento, Southern Italy.

== Distribution and wines ==
Susumaniello is found only in the Italian region of Apulia. Until recently, the variety had fallen quite out of favour with viticulturalists; however, since 6 September 2003 it has been included in the list of varieties approved by the Apulian region for cultivation in the area of central Murgia. It is used as a blending grape in the production of both red and rosé wines such as the Negroamaro-based Brindisi Rosso and Brindisi Rosato and the Ottavianello-based Ostuni Ottavianello.

== Vine and viticulture ==
Susumaniello needs a warm Mediterranean climate.

== Origin ==
There are several theories about Susumaniello's origins, most of which suggest that it came to Apulia across the Adriatic, perhaps from Greece or the Dalmatian coast of Croatia. DNA profiling shows that the variety is a natural cross between an Apulian table grape and the white-wine grape Garganega, which was once thought to be of Greek origin (whence its southern Italian nickname Grecanico); this led some to the conclusion that Susumaniello was also Greek.

According to folk etymology, the name indicates the productiveness of the medium ripening vine, with which you could pack a donkey: the phrase "Susu lu somariellu!" means "Run donkey!" in the local Salentino dialect.

== Synonyms ==
Cozzomaniello, Cuccipaniello, Grismaniello, Mondonico, Puledro, Somarello Nero, Susomaniello, Susomariello Nero, Sussumariello, Susumariello Nero, Uva Nera, Zingarello, Zingariello, Zuzomaniello.

== See also ==
- Primitivo/Zinfandel

== Notes and references ==
- regione.puglia.it Classificate nuove varietà di vite per la produzione dei vini pugliesi (in Italian)
- politicheagricole.it Banca Dati Vini DOC, DOCG e IGT (in Italian)

Footnotes
