= Bianco d'Alessano =

Variety of grape

Bianco d'Alessano is a white Italian wine grape variety that is grown in the Apulia region of southern Italy, where it is often blended with Verdeca. In the early 21st century, the grape was planted in the South Australian wine region of Riverland where varietal examples of Bianco d'Alessano have won wine competition awards as an "Alternative Variety" (as opposed to an "International Variety"). In Italy, the grape has also been historically used in the production of vermouth.

== History ==
Plantings of Bianco d'Alessano have historically been found in the regions of Apulia and Calabria which were once united under the Principality of Taranto and later under the Kingdom of Naples.

Ampelographers believe that Bianco d'Alessano is native to southern Italy, although its exact place of origin is not yet known. The grape has a long history of cultivation in Apulia, and in 2008 DNA analysis showed that the Iuvarello grape that has historically been grown in Calabria was, in fact, Bianco d'Alessano.

== Viticulture ==
Bianco d'Alessano is a mid to late ripening grape variety that maintains high levels of acidity even when allowed to hang on the vine late into the growing season before harvest. In Australia, the grape tends to be harvested later in the season than it does in Italy.

== Wine regions ==
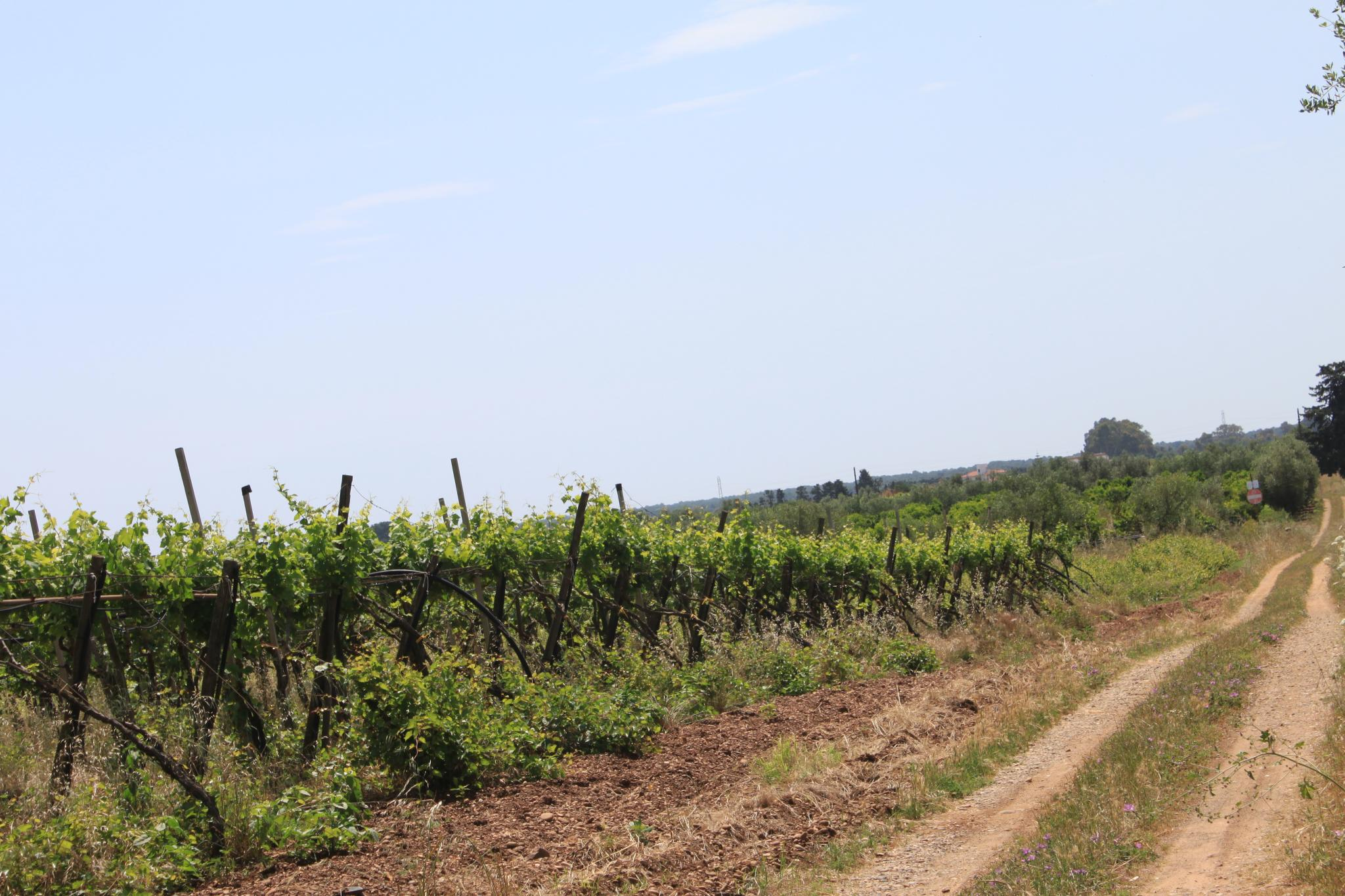
Vineyards in the region of Apulia, where Bianco d'Alessano is grown.

In 2000, there were 960 hectares (2,400 acres) of Bianco d'Alessano in cultivation in Italy with the vast majority of the plantings in Apulia, particularly in the Murgia region in the province of Taranto. Here the grape is usually blended with Verdeca in the Denominazione di Origine Controllata (DOC) wines of Gravina, Lizzano, Locorotondo, Martina Franca and Ostuni.

Outside Italy, the grape can be found in the South Australian wine region of Riverland at Loxton, where it is notable for maintaining high levels of acidity even when harvested late in the season, despite the very warm continental climate of this wine region. As of 2021, there are approximately 2 hectares (4.9 acres) of Bianco d'Alessano growing in Australia. Here, the grape is sometimes made as a varietal, with examples of Australian Bianco d'Alessano winning wine competition awards as an "Alternative Variety".

== Styles ==
In Italy, Bianco d'Alessano is rarely made a varietal wine, instead being blended with other local white Italian varieties such as Verdeca, Bombino bianco, Fiano and Greco. However, in South Australia, varietal examples of Bianco d'Alessano can be found. The grape also has had a long history of being used in the production of flavored fortified wine vermouth.

== Synonyms ==
Over the years, Bianco d'Alessano has been known under a variety of synonyms, including: Acchiappapalmento, Achiappapalmento, Bianco d'Assano, Bianco di Latiano, Bianco di Lessame, Bianco di Palmento, Bianco di Valdigna, Butta Palmento, Iuvarello (in Calabria), Verdurino and Vuiono (in Calabria).
