= Church of Madonna della Greca =

Church building in Locorotondo, Italy

Coordinates: 40°45′13″N 17°19′51″E

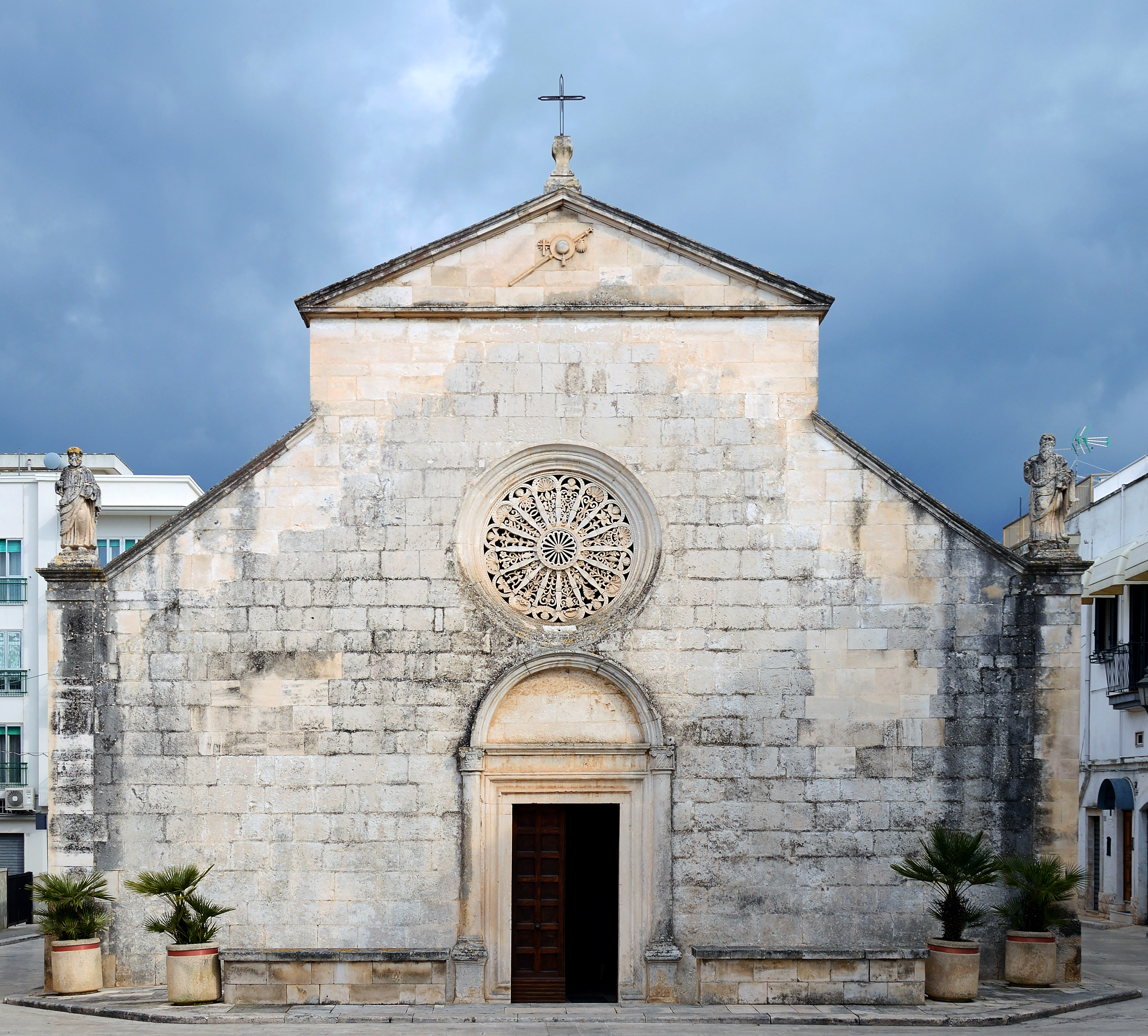

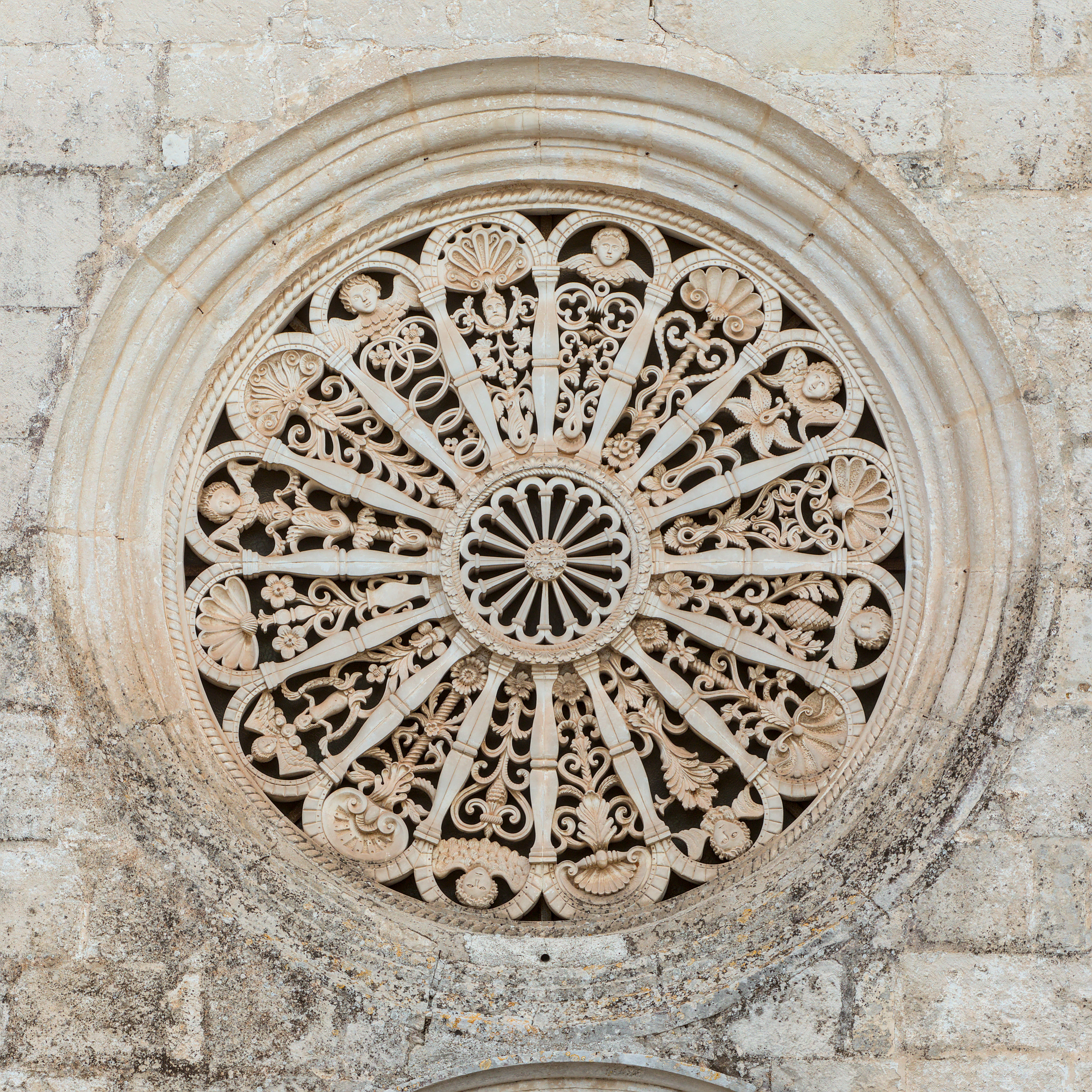
Rose window.

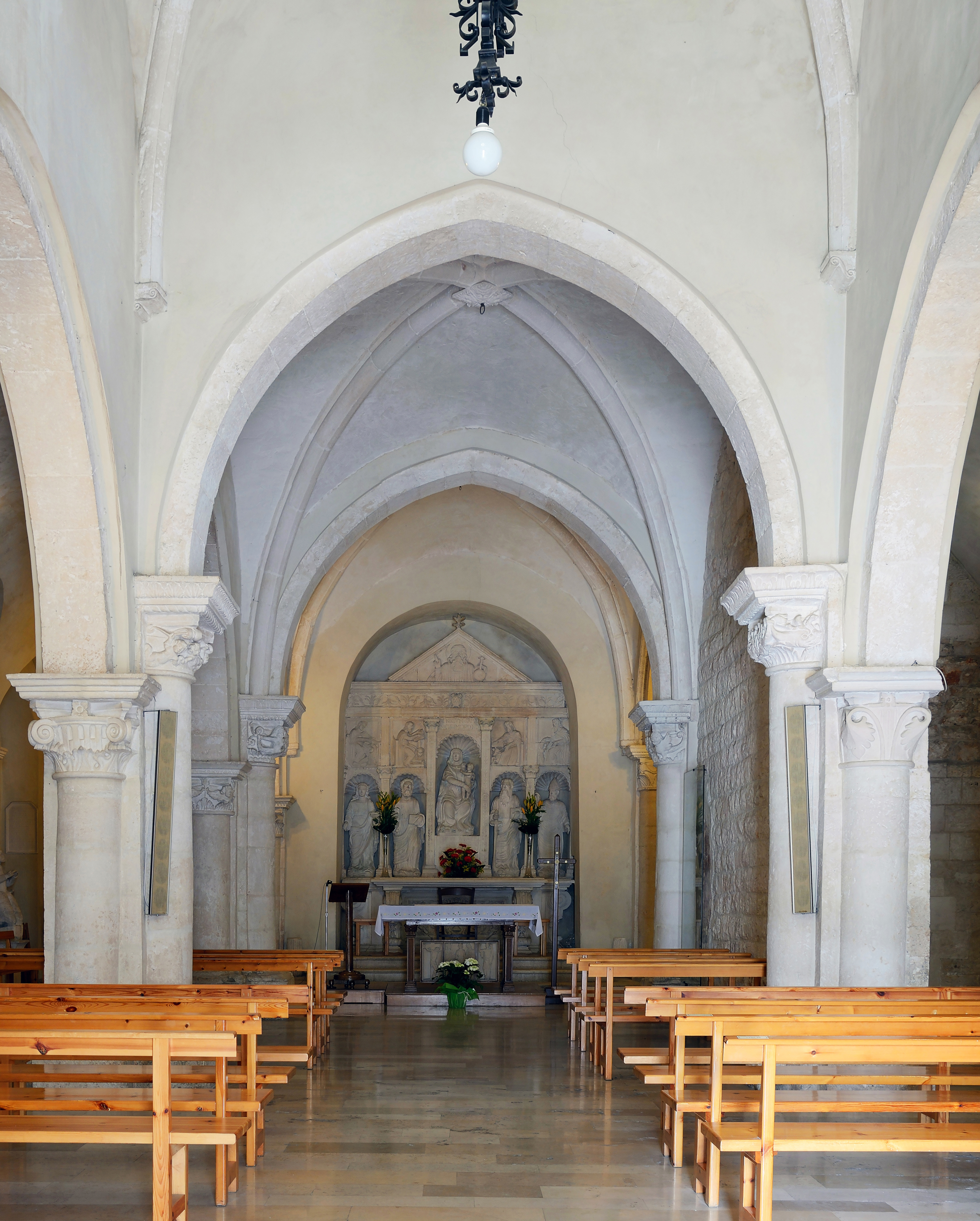
The interior.

The Church of Madonna della Greca is the oldest church in Locorotondo, Apulia, Italy, and it is completely dedicated to Santa Maria della Greca. It was first built between the 7th and 8th century and then reconstructed in the 15th century.

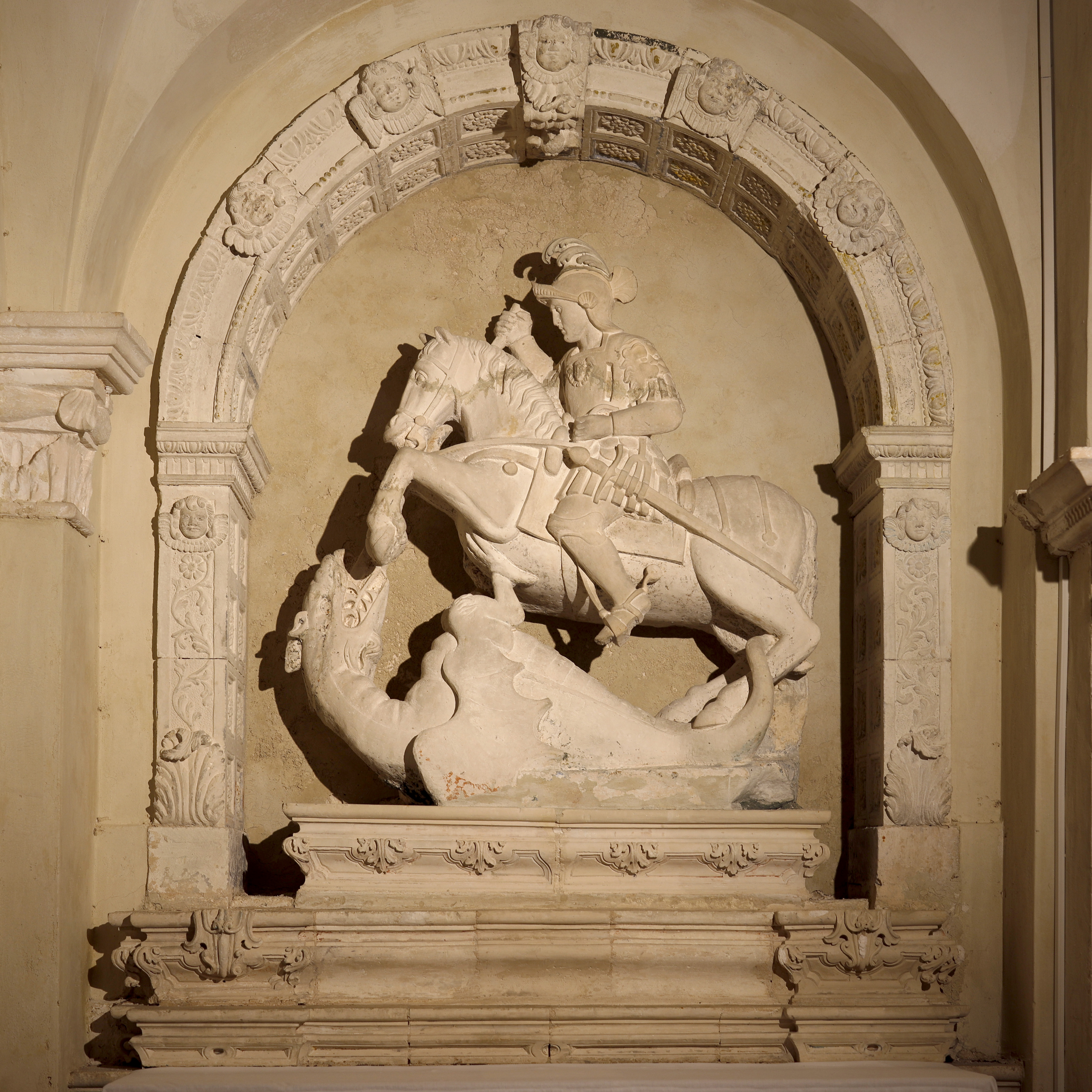
Group of St. George

== History ==
The current structure was supposedly built outside the walls of the town in 1481 on the initiative of Pirro Orsini del Balzo, prince of Taranto; the decision of building it extra moenia was related to the lack of available land in the urban enclosure which is very narrow in itself. The church's name of Santa Maria della Greca suggests the presence of the Greek Orthodox rite in Locorotondo; the dedication is a memory of the Marian cult of the countries of origin of the refugees. Other existing churches in the area have a similar title: the oldest seems to be the ecclesia Sancte Marie Grece of Mesagne, mentioned in a document dated 1 October 1260.

== Description ==
Despite the several changes the church went through in the course of time, it maintains a medieval gothic-style plan in its interior and a medieval simpleness in its exterior. The front is bell-shaped with side weatherings which recall the inner division into a nave and two isles, whereas the façade is opened by a stone rose-window designed by Vito Giuseppe Curri during the Middle-Age and made in the 20th century by Domenico Rosato, a local artist. At the top corners of the first riser of the facade are located the statues of Saints Peter and Paul, coming most probably from the ancient Church Mother. The polystyle pillars present a series of characteristics apart from their difference in height and composition: the bases are classical with protective ornaments in relief (flowers, animals, shells) in the corners, whereas the stems of the semi-columns lack the apophyge. The capitals are a compendium of classical motifs (volutes, cornucopias, grooves) several figurines (putti, sirens, bird bodies with human faces) and other elements of the animal and plant world. On the outside, the Renaissance lunette portal has two capitals probably of other origins which poorly combine with the rest in terms of dimensions.

The church had to be frescoed in the past and it bears nowadays witness to a fragment of fresco of the Madonna with Child on the wall of the right aisle. It is possible to admire some sculptural works made in local stone. The architectural setting presents some proportional inconsistencies, probably due to recent intervention; some statues in local marble are still kept good conditions. The "Virgin of the Roses" polyptych with St Lucy, St Peter, St Paul and St Oronzo, commissioned in the 16th century by Ottaviano Loffredo, baron of Locorotondo, towers above the High Altar. Other two works of art are the bas-relief of St George (1559) placed at the end of the left isle and the Praying statue of a warrior kneeling with clasped hands, whose identity is still unknown.
