= Sensu (disambiguation) =

Sensu is a Latinate word used within set phrases to indicate the sense of another word.

Sensu may also refer to:

- A Japanese folding fan
- Cinsaut, a wine grape
