= Giovanni Gentile (composer) =

Italian composer

Giovanni Gentile (unknown, Olevano Romano – after 1649) was an Italian composer and music teacher.

== Life and works ==
Two sources survive for his life and works: his only surviving work, a teaching-collection of music entitled Solfeggiamenti et ricercari a due voci (Lodovico Grignani, Rome 1642); and the inventory of printed works in the workshop of the Roman printer Sebastiano Testa.

In the teaching-collection's frontispiece, Gentile is called "Signor Giovanni Gentile of Olevano", which means he was a layman not a clergyman, and that his birthplace was Olevano Romano (the existence of another Olevano, in Lomellina, may make even the second of these facts doubtful, but the fact that Gentile's artistic career only appears in Rome makes Olevano Romano more likely to be correct).

As regards his teaching activity, the inclusion of solfeggiamenti a due (solfèges for two voices) in its title is the only clue, along with the record in the aforementioned inventory, that on the date of 13 December 1729 reports: "Giovanni Gentile was from 1645-49 registered as a musician at Santo Stefano del Cacco (Rome), along with 3 grandchildren and some guests, possibly his student. In the vicinity of that church was the printer Ludovico Grignani, who in 1642 published Gentile's Solfeggi e ricercari a 2 voci". We also have a record of a grandson and a guest in the Solfeggiamenti: its dedication to cardinal Francesco Maria Brancaccio is signed by the student Marco Aurelio Desideri, who also composed the fourteenth and last solfeggio, whilst the following one is "by Signor Carlo Gentile, Grandson and Pupil (Discepolo) of the author".
