= Salice Salentino (wine) =

Italian wine

Salice Salentino is an Italian wine produced primarily from the Negroamaro grape in the area surrounding the municipality of Salice, in Apulia. The wine received DOC status in 1976. Chiefly known as a red wine, it also exists as a white and rosé.
