= Locorotondo =

- Comune
- Comune di Locorotondo
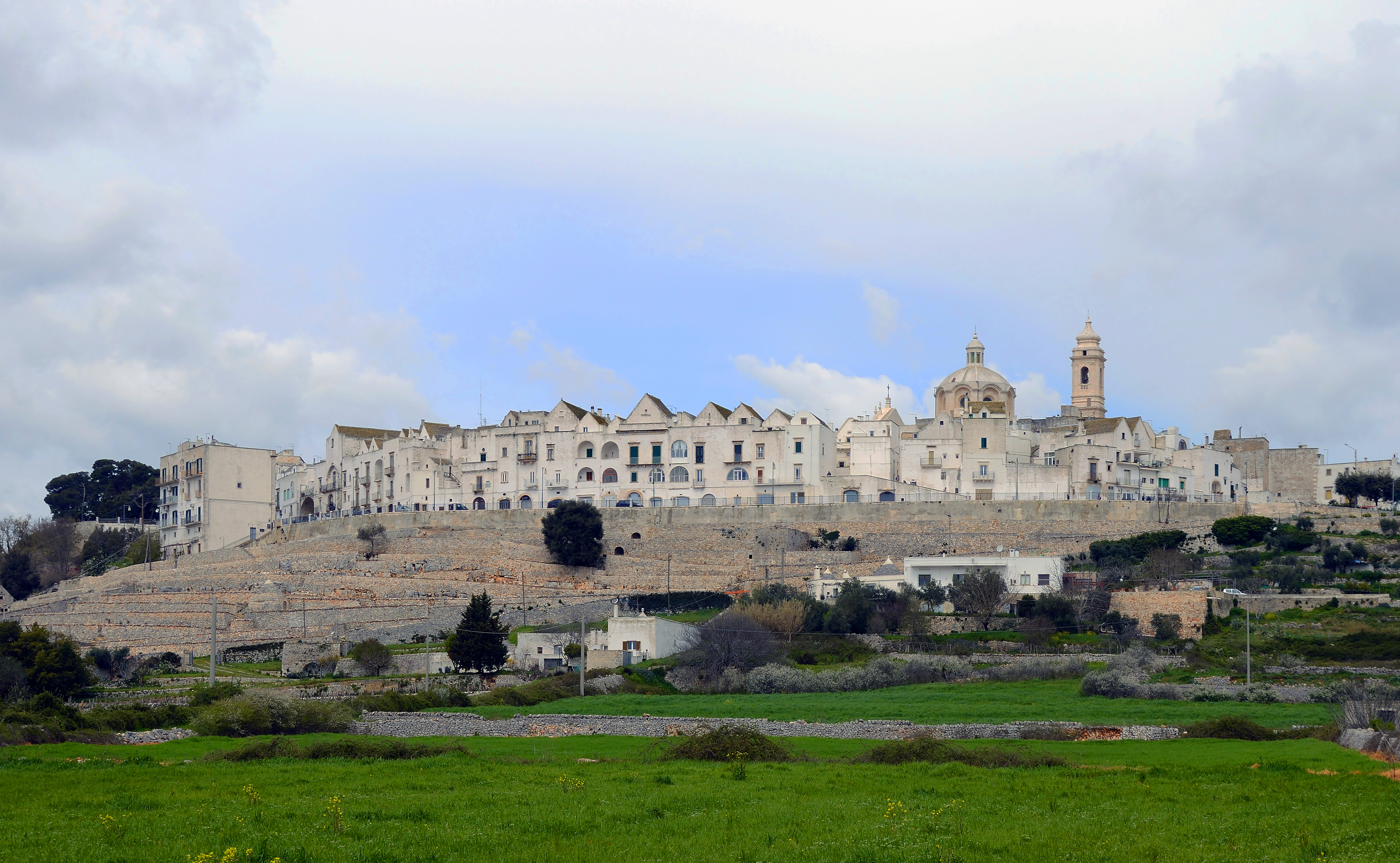
- View from the Itria Valley

- Coat of arms

- Location within Italy Location within Apulia
- Coordinates: 40°45′21″N 17°19′35″E
- Country: Italy
- Region: Apulia
- Metropolitan city: Bari (BA)

Government
  - Mayor: Antonio Bufano

Area
  - Total: 47 km^{2} (18 sq mi)
- Elevation: 410 m (1,350 ft)

Population (1 January 2021)
  - Total: 14,074
  - Density: 300/km^{2} (780/sq mi)
- Demonym: Locorotondesi
- Time zone: UTC+1 (CET)
  - Summer (DST): UTC+2 (CEST)
- Postal code: 70010
- Dialing code: 080
- Patron saint: St. Roch/St.George
- Saint day: 16 August/23 April
- Website: Official website

Locorotondo (Barese: U Curdunne) is a town and municipality of the Metropolitan City of Bari, Apulia, southern Italy, with a population of about 14,000. It is situated between Martina Franca and Alberobello in the Valle d'Itria, a green stretch of countryside dotted with the famous whitewashed cone-roofed trulli houses. Locorotondo is one of I Borghi più belli d'Italia ("The most beautiful villages of Italy") and it has been awarded the Orange Flag of the Touring Club of Italy due to the harmony of its shapes and the accessibility of the old town, as it can be easily visited on foot. It is an intricate network of little streets lined with old buildings and it is known for its typical houses called "Le Cummerse", which have a regular geometric shape and a sloping roof made of two different layers of limestone slabs. These dwellings have nowadays been renovated and offered to visitors in the form of scattered hotels.

== History ==
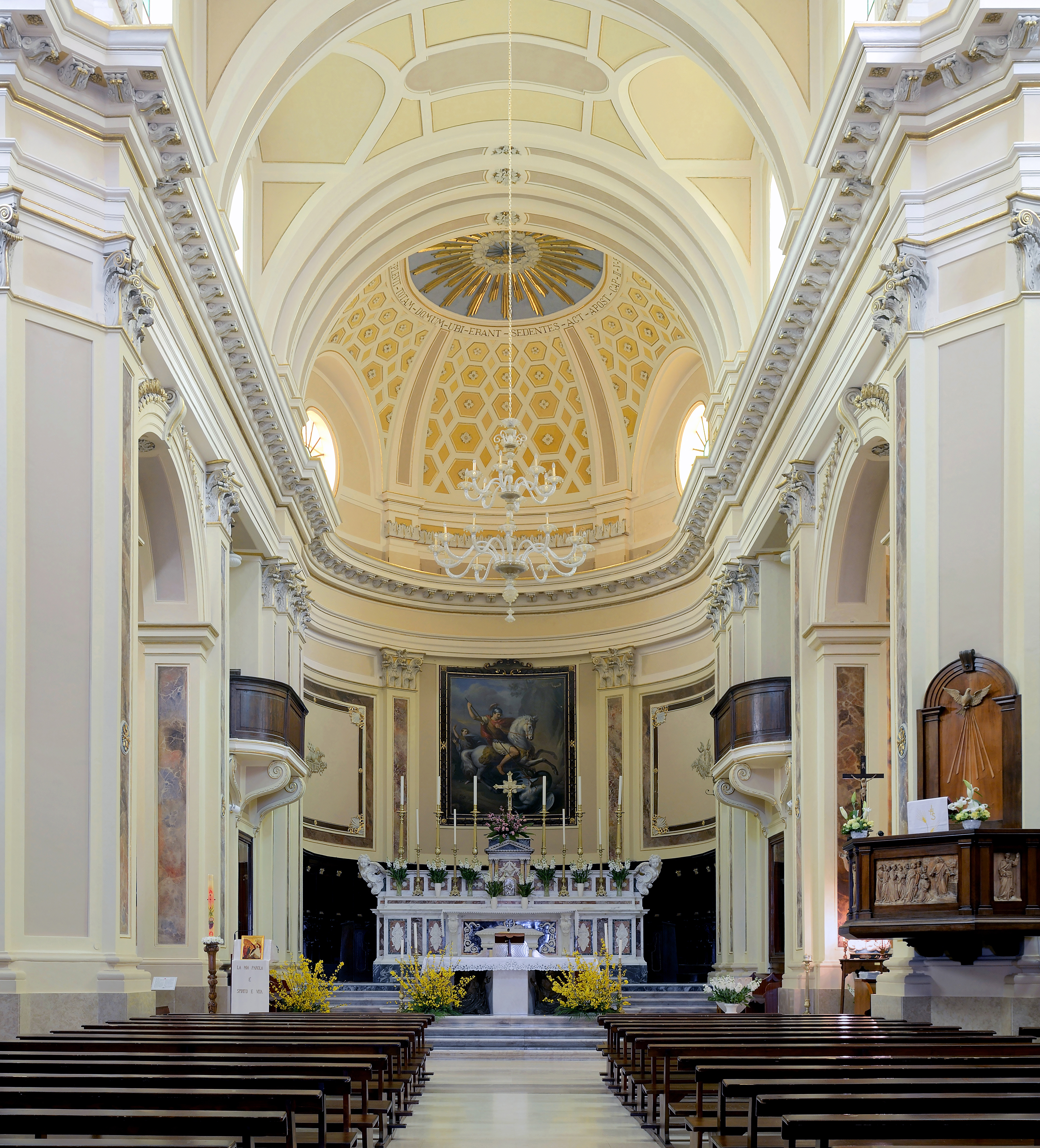
Interior of the church of St. George the Martyr

The site has been settled since ancient times, as testified by archaeological finds dating between the 3rd and the 7th century BC. The foundation of the town dates back to around 1000 AD as an unfortified hamlet under the jurisdiction of the Benedictine monastery of St. Stephen in Monopoli. The estate of various feudal lords for 500 years, it saw an increase in population, housing development, and the construction of the walls and castle. The Caracciolo family, Dukes of Martina Franca and the last feudal lords, remained in Locorotondo until the beginning of the 19th century.

== Heritage and main sights ==
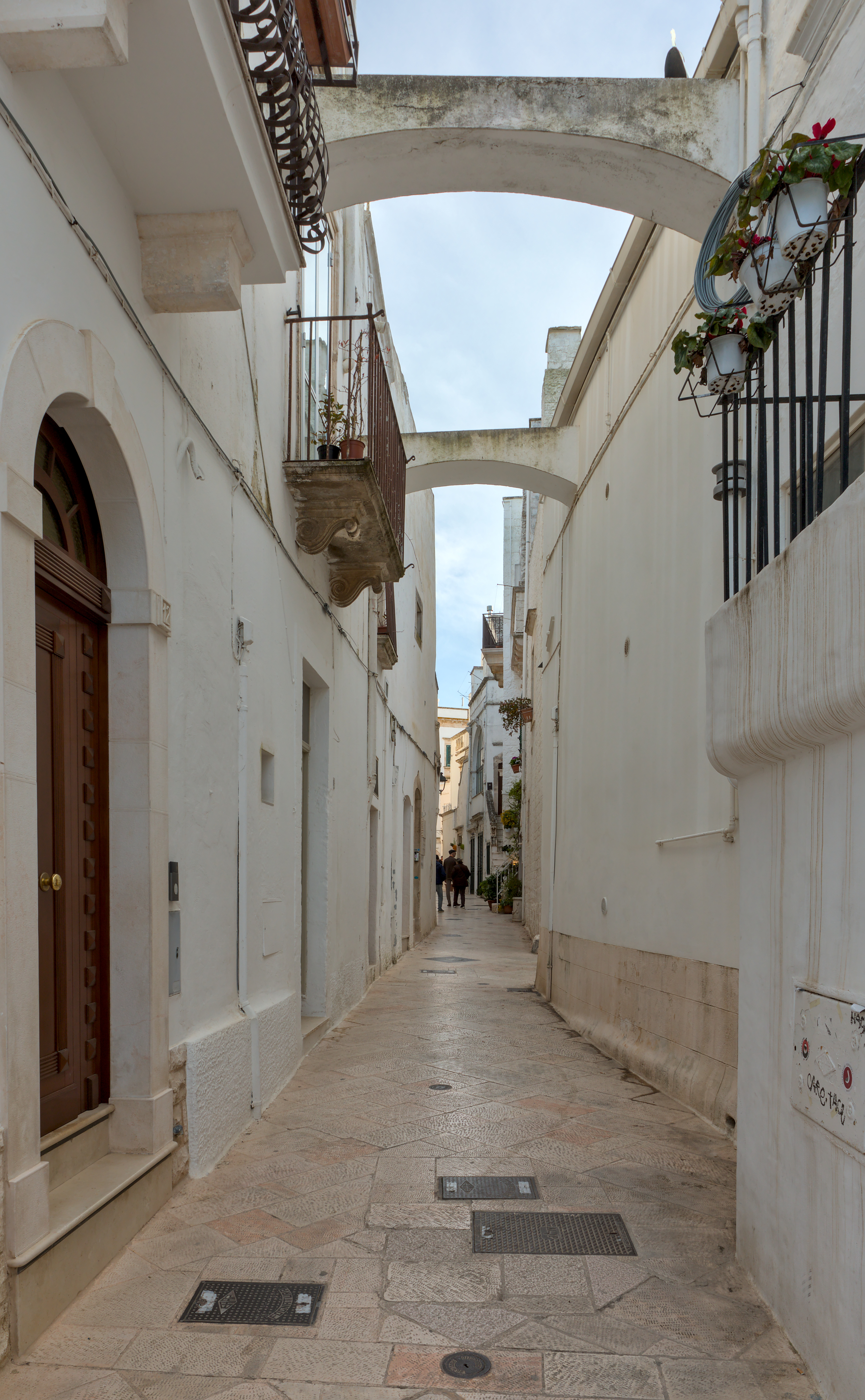
Street in the center

Locorotondo's heritage includes the Mother Church of "St. George the Martyr", built between 1769 and 1821 and characterized by a renaissance-style façade and some neo-classical elements, the Romanesque church of Madonna della Greca and the church of "San Rocco". It hedges its bets with two patron saints; San Giorgio who is celebrated with a market fair on 22 and 23 April and San Rocco, who is awarded a day of musical celebrations (called la Diana), as he still represents the liberation of the town from the plague of the XVII century. The beauty of the historic centre is also constituted by a labyrinth of white alleys, jealously guarded by their inhabitants. The Locorotondo countryside is an example of an area of dispersed settlements (jazzelere) and has an abundance of trulli dwellings which were built around a communal area called "jazzile". This settlement pattern is due in large part to emphyteutic leases, particularly in the 19th century for the development of vineyards.

== Locorotondo DOC ==
The town produces a white Denominazione di origine controllata (DOC) Italian wine that can be made in a still or sparkling Spumante style. The DOC includes 1,650 hectares of vineyards. All grapes destined for DOC wine production must be harvested to a yield no greater than 13 tonnes/ha. The wine is made predominantly (50-65%) from Verdeca and Bianco d'Alessano which can make up 45-50% of the blend. Additional grapes are permitted up to a maximum of 5% including Bombino bianco, Fiano and Malvasia Toscana. The finished wine must attain a minimum alcohol level of 11% in order to be labelled with the Locorotondo DOC designation.

== Notable people ==
- Giovanni Pinto (born 1991), footballer
- Vitantonio Liuzzi (born 1980), racing driver and former Formula One driver
- Priestess (rapper)

== Twin towns ==
- Trzebnica, Poland
