= Bombino bianco =

Variety of grape

- Grape (Vitis)
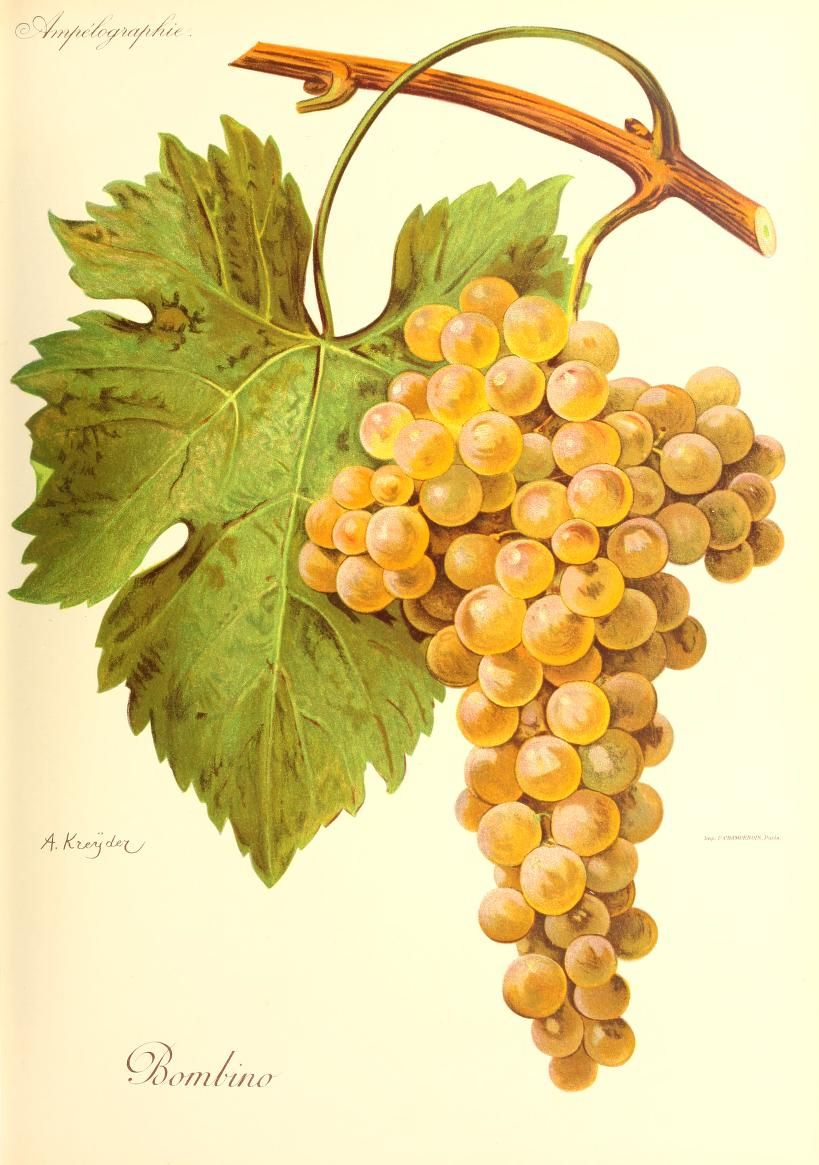
- Color of berry skin: Blanc
- Species: Vitis vinifera
- Also called: Trebbiano d'Abruzzo and other synonyms
- Origin: Italy
- Notable regions: Abruzzo Apulia
- VIVC number: 1533

Bombino bianco is a white Italian wine grape variety planted primarily along Italy's Adriatic coast line, most notably in Apulia. The vine is prone to high yields and often produces neutral flavor wines. The grape is known under many synonyms throughout Italy including Debit and Pagadebit, names which came from the grape's reputation for being a high yielding and reliable crop for vineyard owners to grow that would assure them that on each vintage they could pay off their debts.

The exact origins of the grape are unknown, with early wine texts speculating that the grape may have originated in Spain. Today most ampelographers believe that the grape is indigenous to southern Italy, with Apulia believed to be the most likely home of the grape. In the 20th century DNA profiling has shown that while Bombino bianco is closely related to Bombino nero, the grape is not color mutation but its own distinct variety. Though Bombino bianco shares many synonyms with Trebbiano Toscano (also known as Ugni blanc), the two grapes are unrelated. DNA research has also shown that Bombino bianco may be one of the parent varieties of the Impigno grape of the Ostuni DOC in Apulia and of the Moscatello Selvatico grape that is also native to the same region.

In the Abruzzo wine region, Bombino bianco has been historically associated with Trebbiano d'Abruzzo but in recent years ampelographers have been beginning to doubt that the two grape varieties are the same. Since 1994, the Denominazione di origine controllata (DOC) called Trebbiano d'Abruzzo has listed both grapes as separate varieties permitted in the blend of the white wine. In the European Union it is permitted for the production of bulk table wines and vermouth as well as raisins. It is also imported into Germany for use in as a blending variety for inexpensive sparkling Sekt.

== History ==
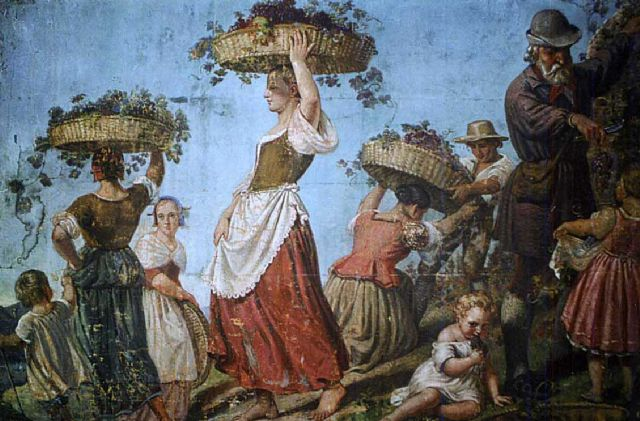
Synonyms for Bombino bianco such as Debit and Pagadebit came about due to the grape's reputation for being a reliable crop that produced large yields that would assure a grower that he could "pay his debts" each vintage.

The name "Bombino" means "small bomb" in Italian with ampelographers believing that the name comes from the circular shape that the clusters of Bombino bianco can take. There have been some speculation in early works of some wine writers that the grape originated in Spain; but that theory has now been largely discounted, with most ampelographers today believing that the grape is indigenous to Italy and likely native to the Apulia region.

Bombino bianco has a long history growing in several Italian wine regions where it has been known under many different synonyms. In the Emilia-Romagna region the grape was known as Pagadebit due to its reputation of being a reliable cropper that a grower could use to "pay his debts". In Lazio, Bombino bianca was known as Ottonese and was once thought to be its own distinctive grape variety until DNA profiling in the early 21st century confirmed that the two grapes were one and the same.

== Viticulture ==
Bombino bianco is a late ripening variety that is most notable for the very high yields that the vine is capable of producing. It is also a relatively easy grape to grow with solid resistant to most viticultural hazards such as the fungal disease powdery and downy mildew as well as botrytis bunch rot.

== Relationship to other grapes ==
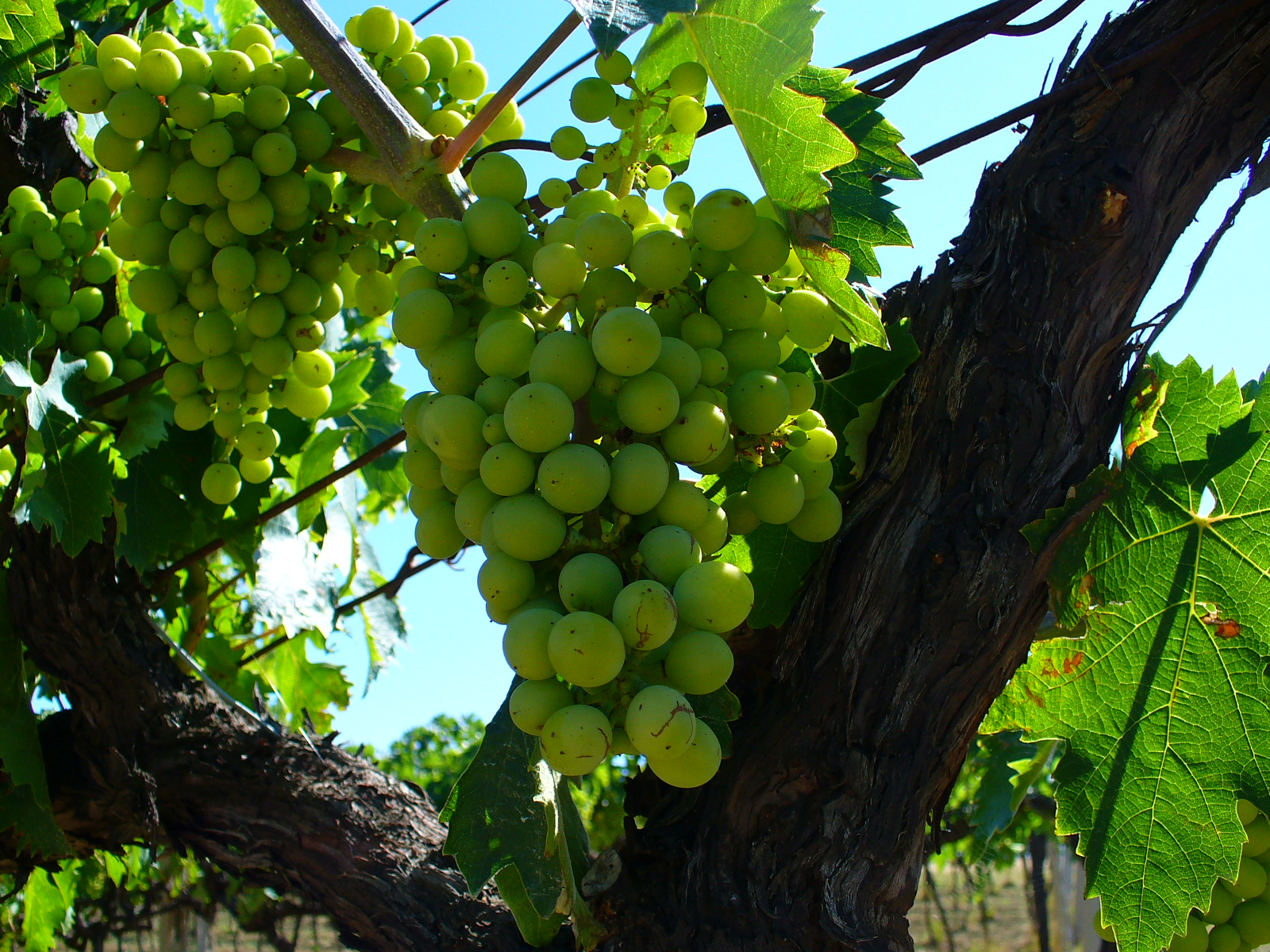
While the exact relationship between Bombino bianco and Trebbiano d'Abruzzo (pictured) is not clear, both grapes are allowed for use in making the DOC wine of Trebbiano d'Abruzzo.

For many years the relationship between Bombino bianco and Bombino nero was thought to be similar to Pinot noir and Grenache to Pinot blanc and Grenache blanc, respectively, in that the two grapes were color mutations of the same variety. However, DNA analysis in the early 21st century showed that while the two grapes are probably very closely related (either as siblings or parent-offspring) they are, nonetheless, two distinct grape varieties.

Similarly, Bombino bianco was long thought to be the Trebbiano d'Abruzzo grape grown throughout the Abruzzo region but while DNA profiling has not conclusively established the relationship between the two varieties (apart from both not being related to the Tuscan/Cognac grape Trebbiano/Ugni blanc), since 1994 they have been listed as a separate varieties in the official grape register of the Italian government and in the regulations for the Trebbiano d'Abruzzo DOC.

DNA analysis has further confirmed that Bombino bianco is not related to the Marche grape Verdicchio of which it shares several synonyms but that Bombino bianco is identical to the Ottonese grape that has long been grown in the Lazio region. Ampelographers have also discovered from DNA studies that Bombino bianco is probably one of the parent varieties of the Apulian grapes Impigno and Moscatello Selvatico.

== Wine regions ==
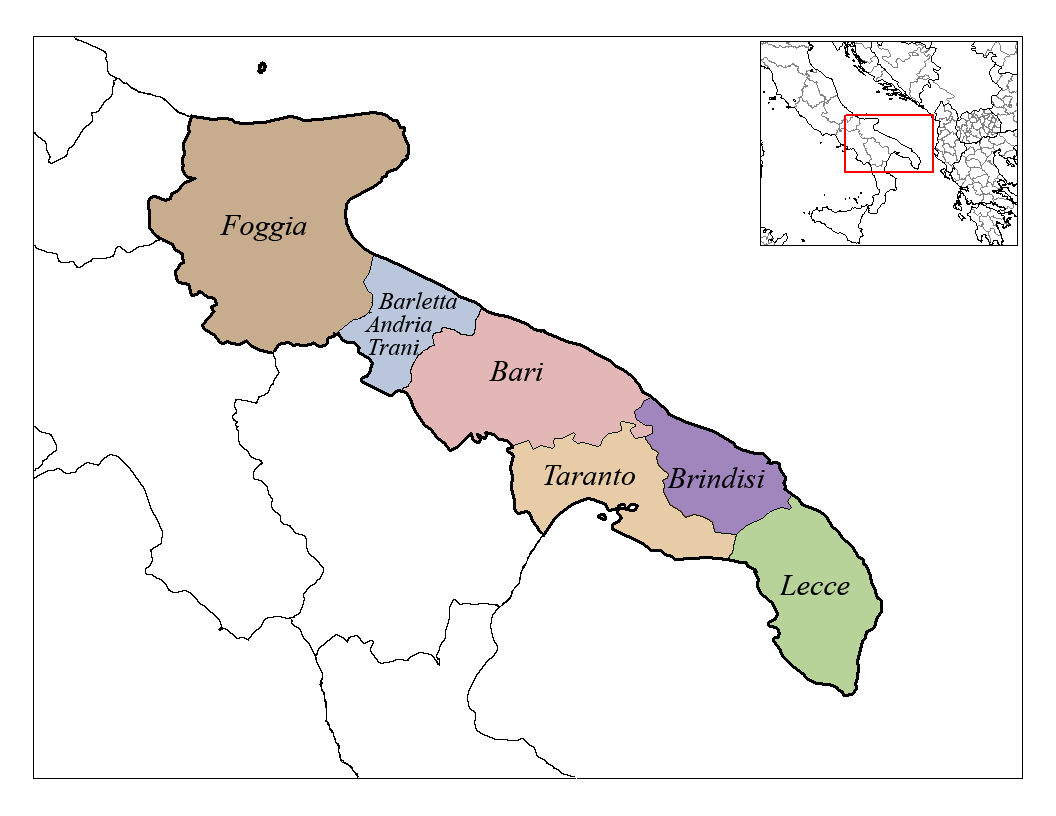
Bombino bianco is most widely grown in the Puglia region, particularly the Bari, Lecce and Foggia provinces.

In 2000, there were nearly 3,000 hectares (7,400 acres) of Bombino bianco planted in Italy, the vast majority of it in southern Italy particularly in the Bari, Lecce and Foggia provinces. Outside of Apulia the grape can be found in the Marche, Molise, Lazio, where it is known as Ottonese (particularly in the province of Frosinone), and in Emilia-Romagna, where the grape is the principal variety in the DOC wine Pagadebit di Romagna. In the Abruzzo, Bombino bianco is historically associated with Trebbiano d'Abruzzo and is often included in the white DOC wine of the same name.

Bombino bianco is a permitted grape variety in several DOC zones including the Biferno DOC in the province of Campobasso and Pentro di Isernia DOC in the Isernia province of Molise, Bianco Capena, Cerveteri, Cesanese di Olevano Romano, Frascati, and Marino DOCs in the province of Rome in Lazio, the Genazzano DOC that includes both the Rome and Frosinone provinces of Lazio, the Colli Romagna Centrale and Pagadebit di Romagna DOC that are produced in both the Forlì-Cesena and Ravenna provinces of Emilia-Romagna, the Gravina DOC from the Bari province in Apulia, Leverano DOC from the province of Lecce, Martina Franca and Locorotondo DOCs that extends into both the Bari and Brindisi provinces, and the Cacc'e mmitte di Lucera and San Severo DOC in the Foggia province of Apulia.

Outside of Italy, Bombino bianco is often imported to other countries in the European Union where it can be blended in bulk table wines. It likewise imported into Germany where it is used in the production of inexpensive sparkling Sekt wine, often blended with Morio Muskat.

=== DOC regulations ===
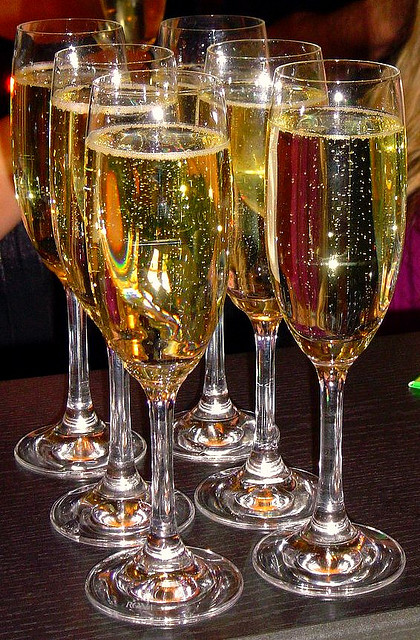
Bombino bianco can be used for still, semi and fully sparkling wines. It is often imported to Germany for the production of inexpensive sparkling sekt.

In the Abruzzo wine region, Bombino bianco is known as Trebbiano d'Abruzzo and has its own DOC that covers virtually the entire Abruzzo region. This DOC has one of the highest permitted harvest yields in all of Italy at 17.5 tonnes/hectare. Both Bombino bianco and Trebbiano Toscano, which was once thought to be the same grape as Trebbiano d'Abruzzo, are permitted to make up the majority of the blend (minimum 85%) with Malvasia Toscano, Cococciola and Passerina permitted to make up the remaining 15% of the blend. The wines must be aged a minimum of 5 months prior to release and must attain a minimum alcohol level of at least 11.5%.

In Emilia-Romagna, between 40 and 50% of the white DOC wine from Colli Romagna Centrale can include Bombino bianco along with Chardonnay, Sauvignon blanc, Trebbiano Toscano and Pinot blanc. Grapes destined for DOC production here are limited to a harvest yield no greater than 12 tonnes/hectare with the finished wines needing to attain a minimum alcohol level of at least 11%. Bombino bianco is also the primary grape in the Pagadebit di Romagna DOC where it must account for at least 85% of the wine. Maximum yields in this DOC are a little higher at 14 tonnes/hectare with a slightly lower 10.5% minimum alcohol level.

In Molise, Bombino bianco grown along the Biferno river in the 135-hectare (330-acre) DOC region are blended (between 20 and 30%) with Trebbiano Toscano and Malvasia bianca. Yields are limited to 12 tonnes/hectare and minimum alcohol levels of at least 10.5%. In the white wine of Pentro di Isernia DOC, Bombino bianco accounts for between 30 and 40% of the blend along with Trebbiano Toscano.

==== DOCs of Lazio ====
In the Lazio wine region, Bombino bianco is often blended (up to 25%) with Malvasia di Candia, Malvasia Toscano, Trebbiano Toscano, Romagnolo, Giallo and Bellone in the wines of the Bianco Capena DOC. These wines can be made in a wide range of sweetness levels from dry Asciutto to sweet Abboccato styles. Bombino bianco grown in this DOC region located 30 kilometers (18.5 miles) north of Rome are limited to a harvest yield of 16 tonnes/hectare with a finished alcohol level of 11%. In Cerveteri, Bombino can only account for a maximum of 15% of the blend that includes the same varieties as Bianco Capena but with Tocai Friulano and Verdicchio also permitted.

In the Cesanese di Olevano Romano DOC that is also in Lazio, Bombino bianco can be used in the still, semi-sparkling frizzante and fully sparkling spumante red wines that are often made slightly sweet. Here the grape is blended with Cesanese Comune, Sangiovese, Montepulciano and Barbera with Bombino bianco limited to make up no more than 10% of the blend along with Trebbiano Toscano. In this DOC, Bombino bianco is limited to a maximum yield of 12.5 tonnes/hectare and a minimum alcohol level of 12%. In the Genazzo DOC located along the southern slopes of Monti Prenestini, Bombino bianco is only used (between 10 and 30%) in the DOC's white wine where it is blended with Malvasia di Candia and Bellone.

In the Marino DOC situated on the volcanic vineyard soils located on the hills east of Rome, up to 10% of the white wine of the DOC can include Bombino bianco where it is blended with Malvasia bianca, Trebbiano Toscano, Romagnolo, Giallo and Verdicchio.

==== DOCs of Apulia ====
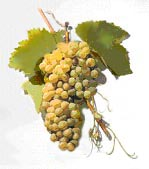
Bombino bianco is often blended with Malvasia (pictured).

In Apulia, the Cacc'e mmitte di Lucera DOC allows between 15 and 30% of Bombino bianco to be blended (along with other white grape varieties like Trebbiano and Malvasia del Chianti) in the red wines of the DOC that made primarily from Uva di Troia, Montepulciano, Sangiovese and Malvasia nera. Bombino bianco grown within this 80 hectares (200 acres) are limited to a maximum yield of 14 tonnes/hectare with a finished alcohol level of at least 11.5% for DOC designated wine. In Leverano, Bombino bianco is permitted up to 35%, along with Trebbiano Toscano, in the predominantly Malvasia bianca-based wines (at least 65%) of the DOC.

In the Gravina DOC, up to 10% of Bombino bianco is permitted in the dry secco and slightly sweet amabile white wines of the DOC that can be produced in both a still and sparkling spumante style. Here the grape is blended with Malvasia del Chianti, Greco di Tufo, Bianco d'Alessano, Trebbiano Toscano and Verdeca. In the white-wine only DOCs of Lacorotondo and Martina Franca, up to 5% of Bombino bianco can be included along with Fiano and Malvasia Toscao in the Verdeca and Bianco d'Alessano based wines of the DOC provided that grapes are harvested to yields no greater than 13 tonnes/hectare and the finished wine reaches at least 11% alcohol by volume.

In the 2,000-hectare (4,900-acre) San Severo DOC, located in the large Capitanata di Puglia zone, between 40 and 60% of the white DOC wine of the region is Bombino bianco with Trebbiano Toscano, Malvasia del Chianti and Verdeca making up the remainder. Here grapes are limited to a yield of 14 tonnes/hectare with a finished alcohol level for both the still and sparkling spumante styles needing to reach at least 11%.

== Styles ==
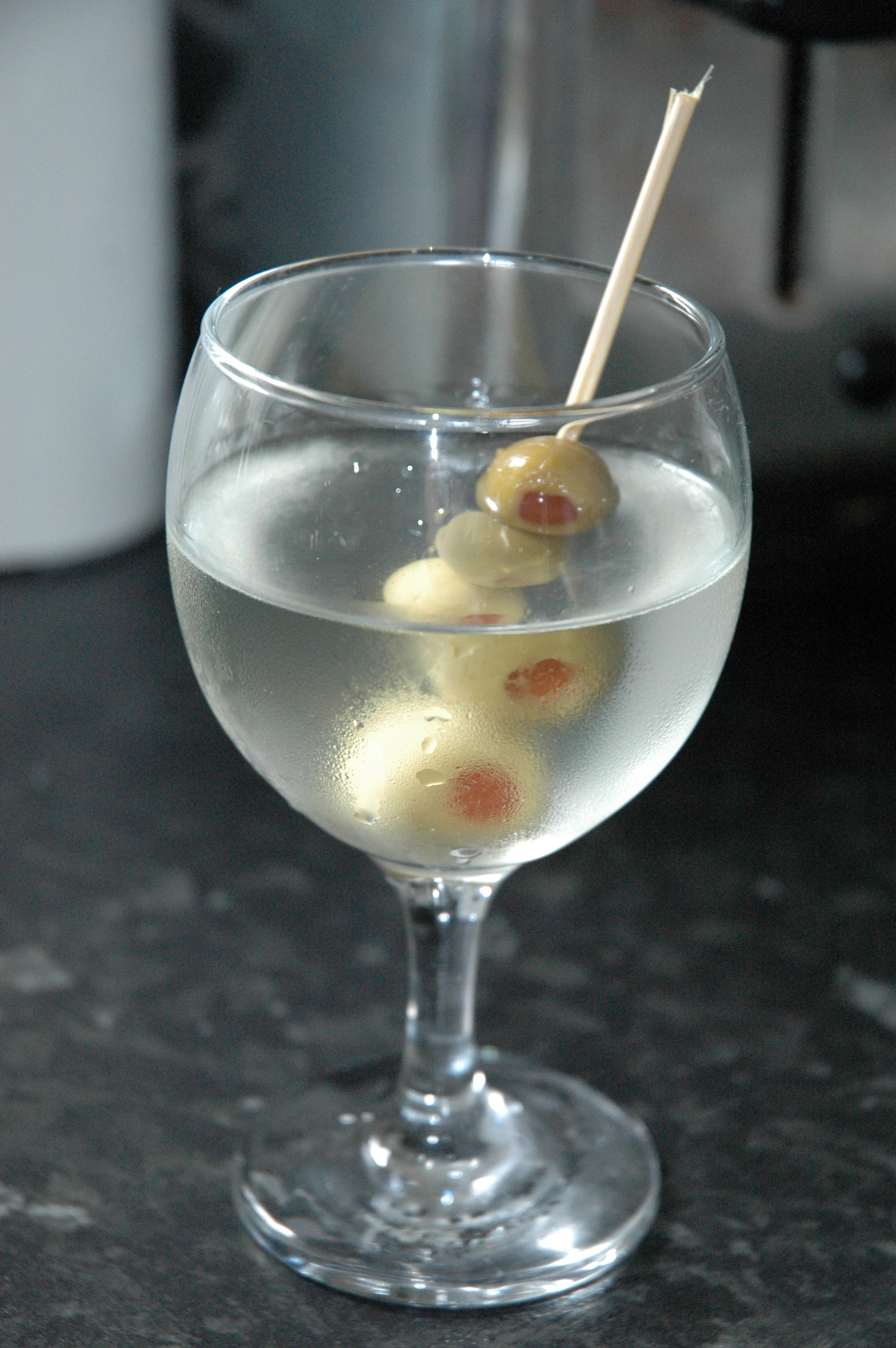
In addition to Bombino bianco's use in winemaking, the grape is also used in raisin production and to make vermouth for martinis.

According to Master of Wine Jancis Robinson, Bombino bianco tends to produce relatively neutral flavored wines that are not very aromatic but can have some citrus or herbaceous notes with some examples showing minerality. While the wine can be made as a varietal, it is most often used as a blending variety in both red and white wines that can be made in a wide range of sweetness levels. In addition to still wines, some DOCs produce semi-sparkling frizzante and fully sparkling spumante styles from the grape.

Wine writers Joe Bastianich and David Lynch describe Bombino bianco as tending to produce light-bodied wines with soft fruit flavors that can have notes of wild flowers and apples. Italian wine writer Victor Hazan, husband of the Italian cookbook writer Marcella Hazan, notes that blended wines such as Trebbiano d'Abruzzo that have a high proportion of Bombino bianco in them tend to have milder fruit flavors and soft palate than wines with a higher proportion of Trebbiano Toscano.

In addition to wine production, Bombino bianco is also used to make raisins and vermouth.

== Synonyms ==
Over the years Bombino bianco has been known under various synonyms including: Abondante, Bambino, Bambino Peloso Gentile, Bammino, Banjac, Bilana, Bobbino, Bommino, Bonvino, Bonvino bianco, Buon Vino, Buonvino bianco, Butta Palmento, Butta Pezzente, Buttspezzante, Calatammurro, Calpolese, Camblese, Campanile, Campolese, Campolese Camplese, Campolese Chiuso, Campolese Scinciaro, Campolese Sciniato, Carapa, Castella, Cococciola, Cola Tamburo, Colatammurro, Debit, Debit Veliki, Donnee, Marese, Ottenese, Ottonese (in central Italy, particularly the Lazio region), Pagadebiti (in Emilia-Romagna), Poulzhinatz, Pulizanac, Puljizanac, Ribola, Ripona, Scacciadebiti, Schiacciadebiti, Straccia Cambiale, Strappa Cambiale, Tivolese bianco, Trebbiano Abruzzese, Trebbiano Bianco di Chieti, Trebbiano Campolese, Trebbiano d'Abruzzo, Trebbiano d'Ora, Trebbiano d'Oro, Trebbiano di Abruzzo, Trebbiano di Avezzano, Trebbiano di Macerata, Trebbiano di Teramo, Trebbiano Dorato di Teramo, Trivolese, Uva Castellana, Uva da un Osso, Uva Fermana, Uva Romana, and Zapponara bianca.
