= Verdeca =

Variety of grape

Verdeca is a white Italian wine grape variety that is primarily grown in Apulia in southern Italy where ampelographers believe that the grape may have originated. In Apulia, it is one of the main grapes in the Denominazione di origine controllata wines of Locorotondo DOC and Martina Franca DOC along with Bianco d'Alessano. In Campania, it is grown on the slopes of Mount Vesuvius where it is used as a blending variety with Falanghina, Coda di volpe and Greco in both the white wines and the sweet dessert wine of the region, Lacryma Christi. It is also a minor component used in the some vermouth production.

== DOC wines ==
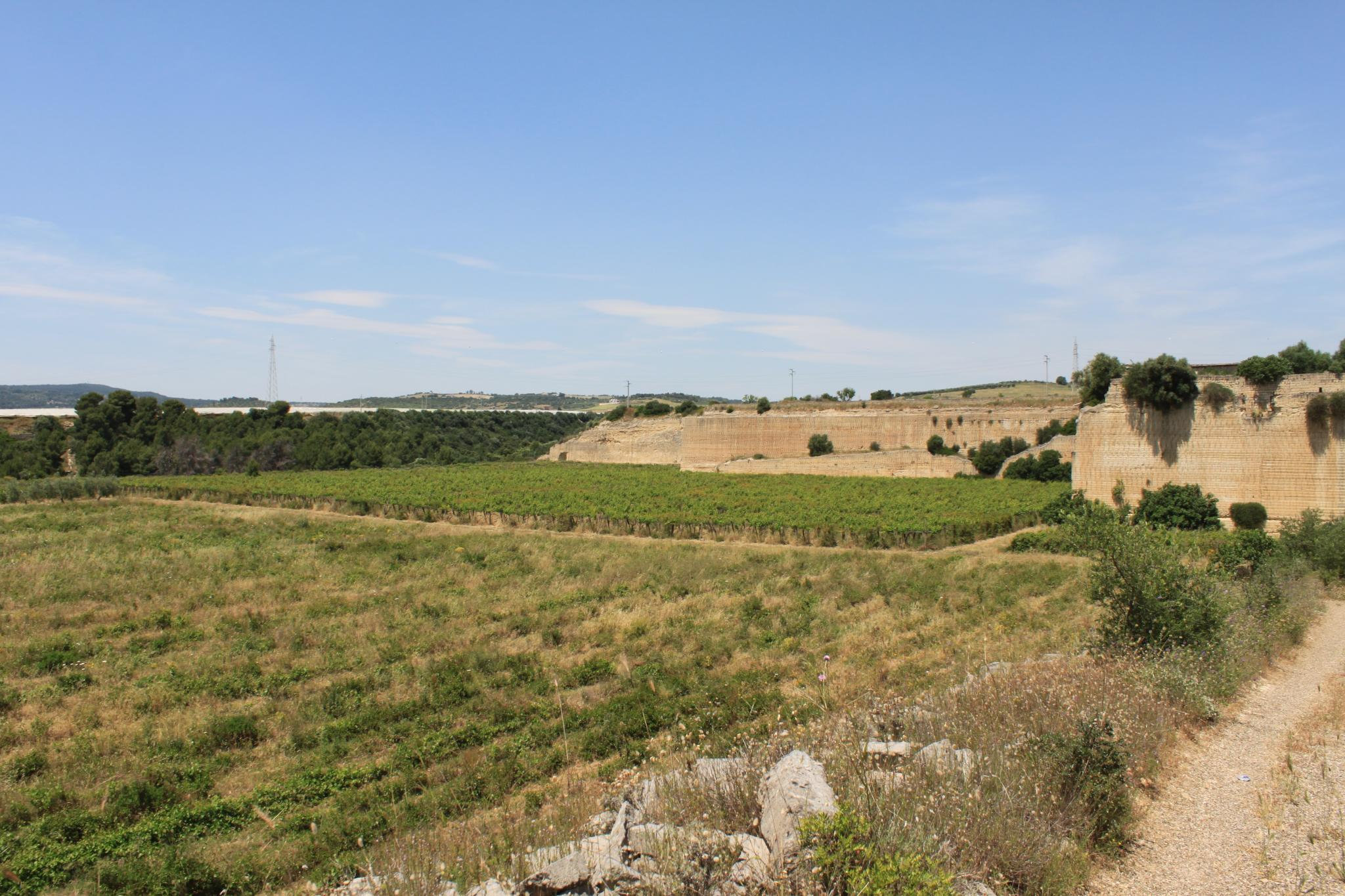
Verdeca is widely grown throughout the Puglia region.

Verdeca is a minor blending component in several DOCs central and southern Italy but some of the more notable DOCs the grape can be found in include:

- Gravina DOC - A white wine only DOC in the Apulia region based around the town of Gravina. The wine is primarily a blend of Malvasia del Chianti (40-65%) with Greco di Tufo and/or Bianco d'Alessano making up the remaining percentages of the blend. Verdeca, along with Bombino bianco and Trebbiano can be used up to a maximum of 10%. Grapes destined for this DOC must be harvested to a yield no greater than 15 tonnes/hectare with the finished wine attaining a minimum alcohol level of 11%. A sparkling Spumante style wine can also be produced under the same DOC requirements as the white wine.
- Locorotondo DOC - A white only DOC in Apulia that covers 1650 ha (4000 acres) around the town of Locorotondo. Verdeca must account for 50-65% of the blend with Bianco d'Alessano usually filling in the remaining 35-50%. Fiano, Bombino and Malvasia Toscana are permitted to be included up to the 5% of the total blend. Grapes destined for DOC wines must be kept to a maximum yield of 13 tonnes/ha with the finished product attaining a minimum alcohol level of 11%. A sparkling Spumante style wine can also be produced under the same DOC requirements as the white wines.
- Martina Franca DOC - A white only DOC in Apulia around the town of Martina Franca in the Itria Valley in Apulia. Verdeca must account for 50-65% of the blend with Bianco d'Alessano usually filling in the remaining 35-50%. Fiano, Bombino and Malvasia Toscana are permitted to be included up to the 5% of the total blend. Grapes destined for DOC wines must be kept to a maximum yield of 13 tonnes/ha with the finished wine attaining a minimum alcohol level of 11%. A sparkling Spumante style wine can also be produced under the same DOC requirements as the white wines.
- Ostuni DOC - Based around three small mountains surrounding the town of Ostuni in the Murgia region near the Adriatic Sea. The white wines are primarily made from the local grapes Impigno (50-85%) and Francavilla (15-50%) with Verdeca allowed in the blend, along with Bianco d'Alessano, up to a maximum of 10%. Grapes destined for DOC wines must be kept to a maximum yield of 11 tonnes/ha with the finished product attaining a minimum alcohol level of 11%.
- San Severo DOC - A DOC containing around 2,000 ha (5,000 acres) situated around the town of San Severo, north of Foggia in the Capitanata di Puglia region. The white wines of the DOC are primarily Bombino Bianco (40-60%) and Trebbiano Toscano (40-60%) with Verdeca, along with Malvasia del Chianti, permitted up to a maximum of 20%. Grapes destined for DOC wines must be kept to a maximum yield of 14 tonnes/ha with the finished attaining a minimum alcohol level of 11%.
- Velletri DOC - Based around the town of Velletri in the Lazio region. The white are primarily composed of Malvasia Bianca di Candida (up to 70%) with Verdeca, Trebbiano and Giallo permitted up to 30% total and Bellone and Bombino bianco permitted up to 10%. Grapes destined for DOC wines must be kept to a maximum yield of 16 tonnes/ha with the finished wine attaining a minimum alcohol level of 11%.
- Vesuvio DOC - Large DOC based in the volcanic soils around Mt. Vesuvius. The white wines are composed primarily of Coda di Volpe (35-80%) with Verdeca permitted up to 45% and Falanghina and Greco up to 20%. Grapes destined for DOC wines must be kept to a maximum yield of 10 tonnes/ha with the finished product attaining a minimum alcohol level of 11%. The sweet dessert wine Lacryma Christi can also be produced under the same DOC blend/requirements of the white wine with the finished wine needing to reach a minimum alcohol level of 12%.

== Wine styles ==
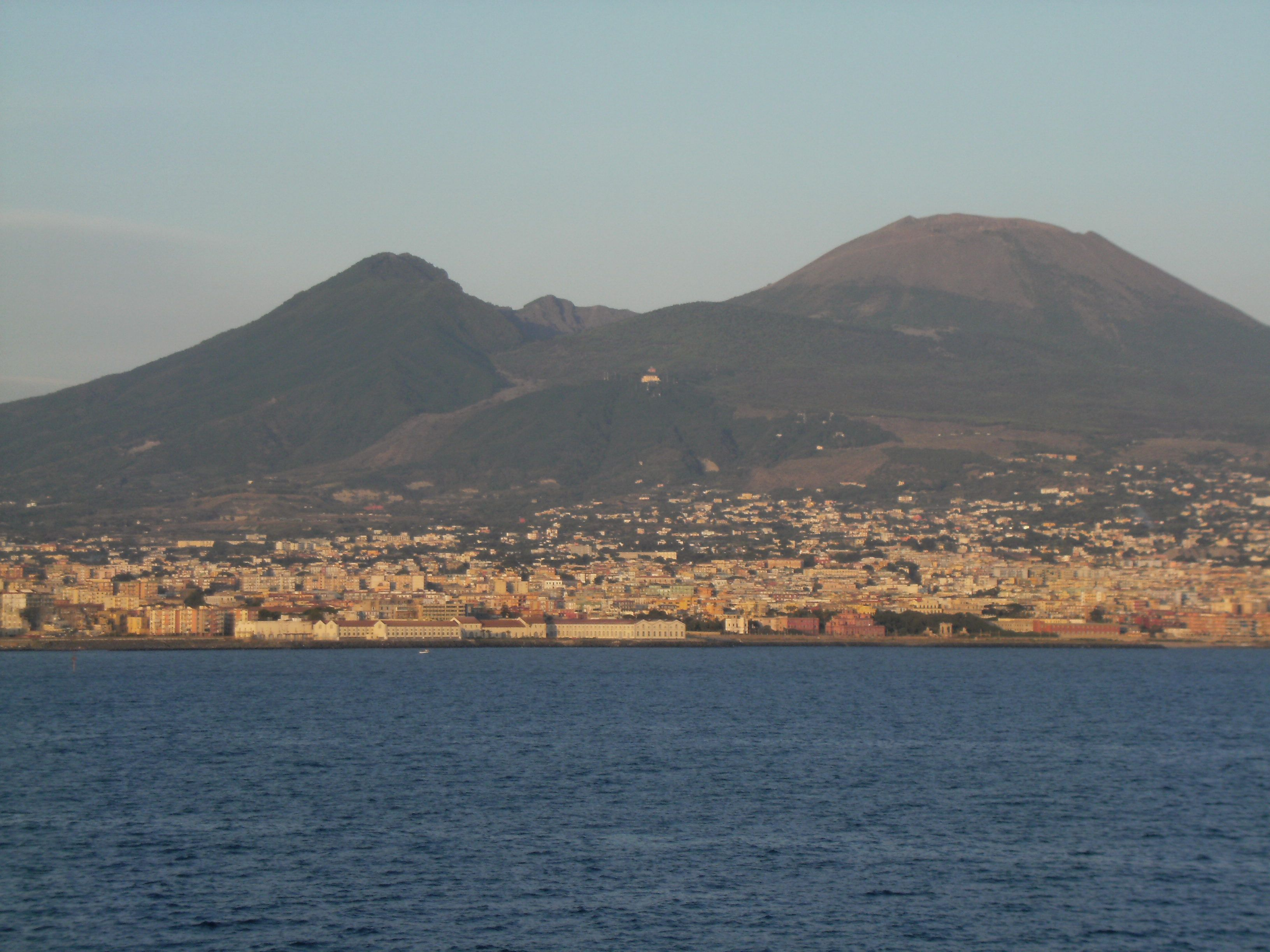
Some Verdeca is grown on the volcanic slopes of Mount Vesuvius (pictured) where it is blended with the local white wine and in the dessert wine Lacryma Christi.

While used mostly as blending variety, Verdeca on its own can produce minerally wines that tend to have a "flinty" note. The grape ripens very late and even in the very warm regions of southern Italy tends to have fairly high acidity and green, vegetal notes.

== Synonyms ==
Over the years Verdeca has been known under a variety of synonyms including: Albese bianco, Albina verde, Alvino verde, Biancolina, Carosella, Primarulo, San Gennaro, Tivolese, Uva marana, Verdacchio, Verde, Verdea, Verdera, Verdesca, Verdicchio bianco, Verdicchio femmina, Verdicchio Verde, Verdicchio Peloso, Verdichio Tirolese, Verdichio Tivolese, Verdicella, Verdigno, Verdisco, Verdisco bianco, Verdisio bianco, Verdolino, Verdone and Vino verde.
