= Ostuni DOC =

Italian controlled origin wine

Ostuni
- Wine region
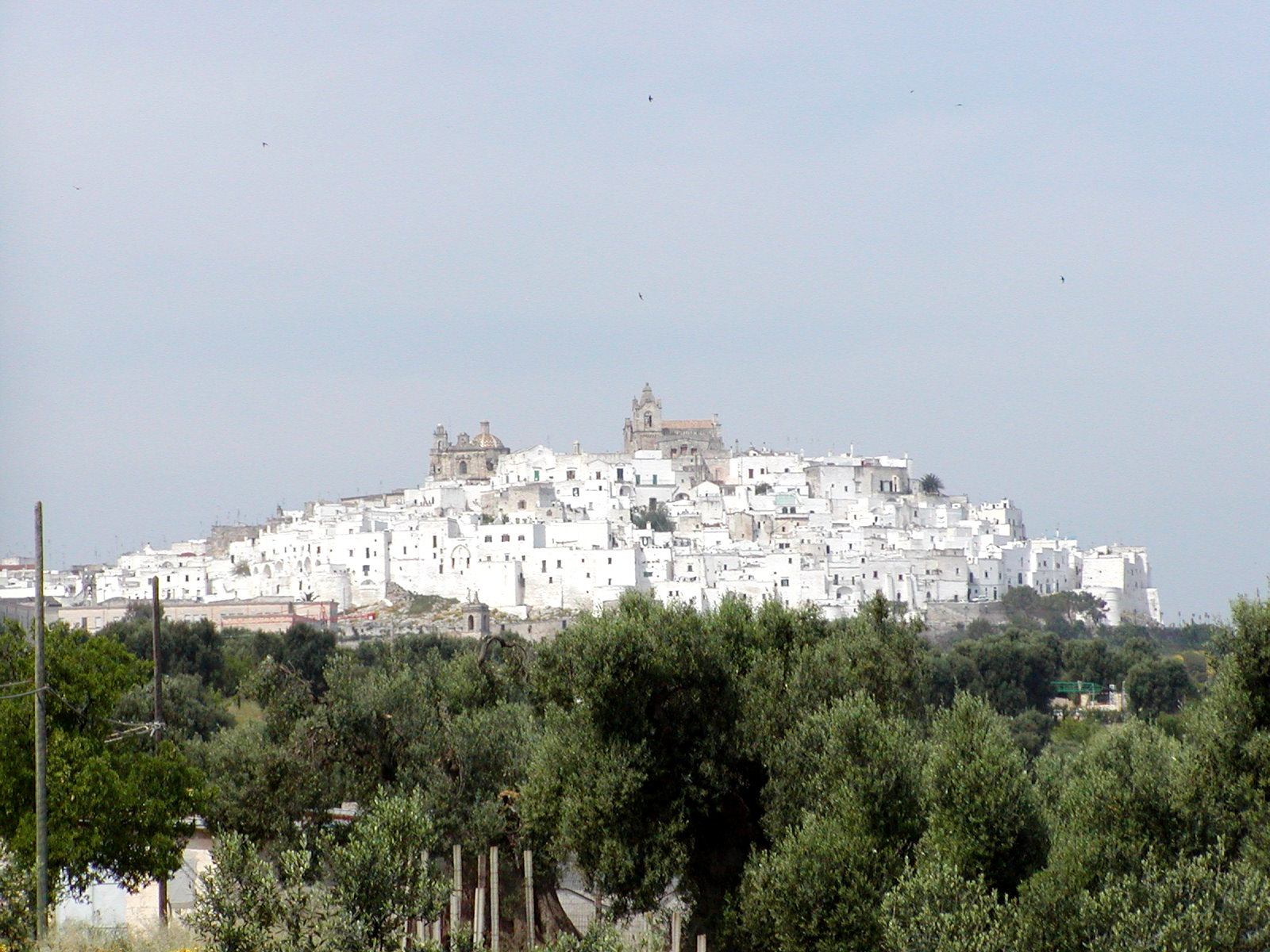
- The village of Ostuni that lends its name to the DOC region
- Type: DOC
- Year established: 1972
- Country: Italy
- Part of: Brindisi, Puglia
- Size of planted vineyards: 3 hectares (7.4 acres)
- Grapes produced: Ottavianello, Francavidda, Impigno
- Wine produced: 80 hl

Ostuni is a white or rosé style Italian wine awarded Denominazione di Origine Controllata (DOC) status in 1972, in the Province of Brindisi of Apulia. The zone of production of the area is limited to the communes of Ostuni, Carovigno, San Vito dei Normanni, San Michele Salentino and parts of the communes of Brindisi, Latiano and Ceglie Messapica.

== Climate and geography ==
The Ostuni region has a Mediterranean climate influenced by its proximity to the Adriatic Sea. Situated among three small mountains at the edge of the Murge range, vineyards in the area experience diverse microclimate and terroir variations. The DOC gets its name from the nearby town of Ostuni.

== Grape varieties ==
The primary grape variety of the DOC classified red wine is Ottavianello (also known as Cinsaut in France), with the wine sometimes labeled as Ostuni Ottavianello. Ottavnianello must comprise at least 85% of the blend. Up to 15% may consist of Negroamaro and/or Malvasia Nera and/or Notar Domenico and/or Sussumaniello grapes. The white DOC classified wine, Ostuni Bianco, is composed of a blend of mostly Impigno and Francavilla. Impigno must account for at least 50% of the blend with Francavilla usually comprising the remainder. DOC regulations also permit an inclusion up to 10% of Bianco de Alessano and/or Verdeca.

== Wines ==
Ostuni Ottavianello is characterized by its light body and pale cherry color. Both the red and white Ostuni wines are almost always dry. In recent years the wines of Ostuni have garnered more international interest as the overall quality level has improved with investments in viticulture and winemaking.

== Production ==
Province, vintage, volume in litres

- Brindisi (1990/91) 1,330
- Brindisi (1991/92) 7,397
- Brindisi (1992/93) 9,479
- Brindisi (1993/94) 8,526
- Brindisi (1994/95) 12,082
- Brindisi (1995/96) 4,888
