= Samsó =

Samsó can refer to one of two wine grapes:

- Carignan, which is known as Samsó in Catalonia
- Cinsault, which is also known as Samsó in parts of Catalonia, though more commonly as Sinsó

== See also ==
- Samsø, a Danish island
- Space And Missile Systems Organization (SAMSO), a predecessor of the Space and Missile Systems Center.
