= Olevano Romano =

- Comune
- Comune di Olevano Romano
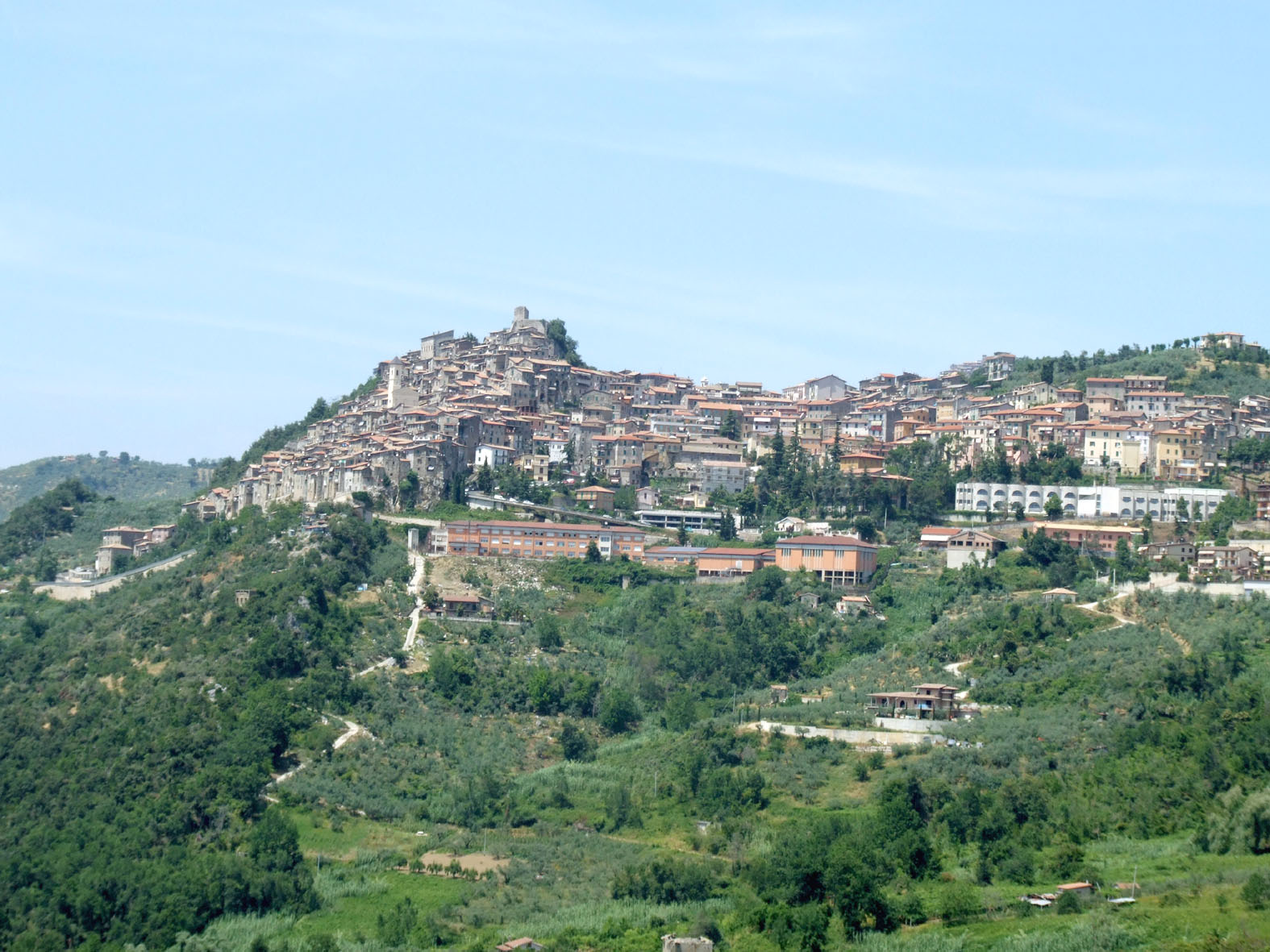
- View of Olevano Romano

- Coat of arms

- Location within Italy Location within Lazio
- Coordinates: 41°51′N 13°2′E
- Country: Italy
- Region: Lazio
- Metropolitan city: Rome (RM)

Government
  - Mayor: Umberto Quaresima

Area
  - Total: 26.16 km^{2} (10.10 sq mi)
- Elevation: 571 m (1,873 ft)

Population (30 November 2017)
  - Total: 6,639
  - Density: 253.8/km^{2} (657.3/sq mi)
- Demonym: Olevanesi
- Time zone: UTC+1 (CET)
  - Summer (DST): UTC+2 (CEST)
- Postal code: 00035
- Dialing code: 06
- Website: Official website

Olevano Romano is a comune (municipality) in the Metropolitan City of Rome in the Italian region of Latium, located about 45 kilometres (28 mi) east of Rome.

It is the probable birthplace of the composer Giovanni Gentile.

== Culture ==
Starting from the early 19th century, and continuing into the present significantly more than a thousand artists from almost all European countries as well as American ones, visited Olevano to paint its landscapes and the town. Artworks depicting Olevano and its surrounding area can be found in almost all major museums in Europe and America. Today the art museum in Olevano Romano exhibits works from its collection of more than 2000 works of art as well as organises thematic exhibitions and issues catalogues etc.

== Cesanese di Olevano Romano DOC ==
The commune of Olevano Romano is home to the Denominazione di origine controllata (DOC) wine of Cesanese di Olevano Romano. This red Italian wine can be produced in both a still, semi-sparkling frizzante and fully sparkling spumante style that can be both dry and slightly sweet. All grapes destined for DOC wine production must be harvested to a yield no greater than 12.5 tonnes/ha. The wine is made primarily (at least 90%) from the Cesanese Comune grape (also known as Cesanese di Affile) with Sangiovese, Barbera and the white wine grape varieties Trebbiano Toscano and Bombino bianco collectively allowed to make up to 10% of the blend. The finished wine must attain a minimum alcohol level of 12% in order to be labelled with the Cesanese di Olevano Romano DOC designation.

== Twin towns ==
- Volgograd, Russia, since 2011
