= Fiano (grape) =

Variety of grape

- Grape (Vitis)
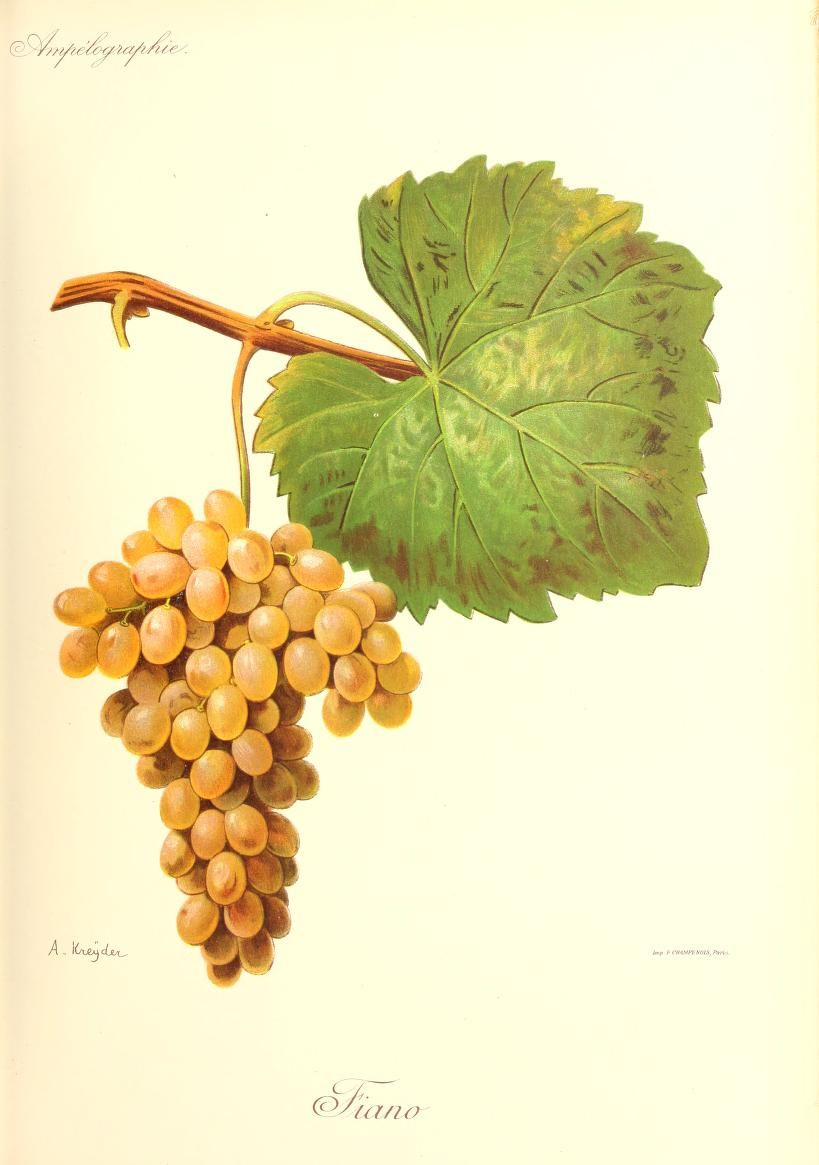
- Fiano in Viala & Vermorel
- Color of berry skin: Blanc
- Species: Vitis vinifera
- Also called: See list of synonyms
- Origin: Italy
- Notable regions: Campania
- VIVC number: 4124

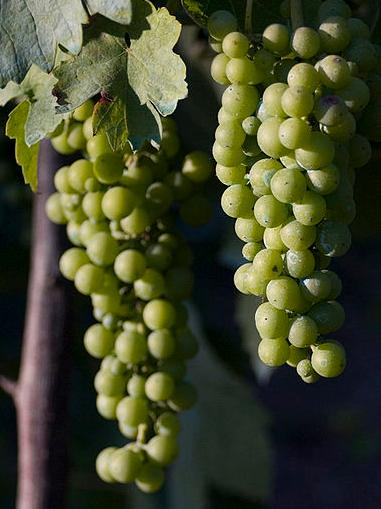
Fiano grapes pre-veraison

Fiano is a white Italian wine grape variety that is grown primarily in the Campania region of southern Italy and on the island of Sicily. In Campania, this fairly strong flavored white wine grape is particularly noted around Avellino where the Denominazione di origine controllata e Garantita (DOCG) wine of Fiano di Avellino is produced. The grape has a long history in the Campanian region and is believed to have been the grape behind the ancient Roman wine Apianum. Even today, the name Apianum is permitted to appear on wine labels of the DOCG wine Fiano di Avellino.

Outside of Italy, several Australian wine producers have begun to use the grape. Production seems to be increasing, although the number of vineyards growing it is still small. A major place of production is in the McLaren Vale wine region of South Australia along with the Clare Valley and in the Hunter Valley wine region of New South Wales. More recently, some winemakers in Argentina are producing Fiano in the La Rioja district, north of Mendoza.

Beyond its strong flavors and intense aroma notes, the Fiano grapevine is noted viticulturally for the relatively low yields it produces.

October 17th is International Fiano Day.

== History ==
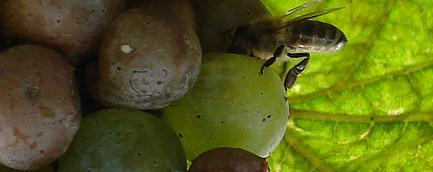
The Roman wine Apianum was produced by a grape known as vitis apiana, whose name is related to the Latin word for "bees" (apis; pl: apes), which were strongly attracted to the sugary pulp of the grapes. Today, wine historians believe that the grape behind Apianum may have been Fiano.

Ampelographers and wine historians consider Fiano a "classical vine" of southern Italy that likely has its origins in ancient Roman viticulture and perhaps may have even been cultivated by the ancient Greeks before them. Wine writer Jancis Robinson notes that some historians speculate that Fiano may have been the grape behind the Roman wine Apianum that was produced in the hills above Avellino. The wine was produced by a grape known to the Romans as vitis apiana, with the root of apiana being the Latin for bees. Even today bees are strongly attracted to sugary pulp of Fiano grapes and are a prevalent sight in the vineyards around Avellino.

The small, thick-skinned berries of Fiano usually produce very little juice and, given the vines natural propensity for low yields, can make Fiano an unprofitable variety to grow. It was for reasons such as this that Fiano saw significant declines for most of the 19th and 20th century as growers uprooted the grape in favor of varieties like Trebbiano and Sangiovese that could yield larger amounts of wine. However, in recent years, the variety has enjoyed an uptick in interest as southern Italian wine regions see an influx of investment in the modernization of winemaking techniques and equipment, as well as a desire to revitalize indigenous and classical varieties.

== Wine regions ==
The Fiano grape is most closely associated with the Campanian DOCG wine of Fiano di Avellino. Nearing extinction in the later half of the 20th century, interest in the variety, spearheaded by producers such as Mastroberardino, saw a renaissance of planting around Avellino. Some of the most notable plantings of Fiano are found in hazelnut plantations around Avellino with wine tasters such as Jancis Robinson noting that the wines produced from these grapes can have a slight hazelnut flavor to them.

In 2003, the area around Avellino received DOCG status for the Fiano-based wine produced. For the Fiano di Avellino DOCG, at least 85% of the wine must be made from Fiano with Greco, Coda di Volpe and Trebbiano permitted to round out the remainder of the blend. Grapes destined for this DOCG wine must be limited to a maximum harvest yield of 10 tonnes/hectare and fermented to a minimum alcohol level of 11.5%. Italian wine laws allow for producers to use the name Apianum along with the Fiano di Avellino DOCG designation to show the modern wine's connection with the historical Roman wine.

It is also grown in California and produced by Cruess and Starfield Vineyards from grapes in the Russian River Valley AVA and El Dorado AVA respectively, among other wineries.

=== Other DOC wines ===
The following is a list of DOC wines, beyond Fiano di Avellino, that include Fiano as a permitted grape variety, along with other grapes that may be included in the blend under varying percentages that are regulated under the DOC/G label. The wines of which Fiano must account for a majority of the blend are in bold.

- Aversa DOC – primarily Asprinio, with up to 15% permitted to be Fiano and/or other local white grape varieties.
- Campi Flegrei DOC – primarily Falanghina, Biancolella and Coda di Volpe with up to 30% permitted to be Fiano and/or other local white grape varieties.
- Castel San Lorenzo DOC – primarily Trebbiano and Malvasia with up to 20% permitted to be Fiano and/or other local white grape varieties
- Cilento DOC – must contain between 60 and 65% Fiano with 20-30% Trebbiano, 10-15% Greco and/or Malvasia and up to 10% of other local grape varieties.
- Costa d'Amalfi DOC – primarily Falanghina and Biancolella with up to 40% permitted to be Fiano and/or other local white grape varieties.
- Galluccio DOC – primarily Falanghina with up to 30% permitted to be Fiano and/or other local white grape varieties.
- Guardiolo DOC – primarily Falanghina with up to 30% permitted to be Fiano and/or other local white grape varieties.
- Ischia DOC – primarily Forastera, Biancolella and San Lunardo with up to 15% permitted to be Fiano and/or other local white grape varieties.
- Locorotondo DOC – primarily Verdeca and Bianco d'Alessano with up to 5% permitted to be Fiano, Bombino bianco and/or Malvasia.
- Martina Franca DOC – primarily Verdeca and Bianco d'Alessano with up to 5% permitted to be Fiano, Bombino bianco and/or Malvasia.
- Monreale DOC – primarily Catarratto, Ansonica and Inzolia with up to 50% permitted to Fiano and/or other local white grape varieties.
- Penisola Sorrentina DOC – primarily Falanghina, Biancolella and Greco with up to 40% permitted to be Fiano and/or other local white grape varieties.
- Sannio DOC – primarily Trebbiano with up to 50% permitted to be Fiano, Samnium-Aglianico, Moscato, Coda di Volpe, Falanghina and Greco.
- Sant'Ágata dei Goti DOC – primarily Falanghina and Greco with up to 20% permitted to be Fiano and/or other local white grape varieties.
- Solopaca DOC – primarily Trebbiano, Malvasia, Coda di Volpe with up to 10% permitted to be Fiano and/or other local white grape varieties.
- Taburno DOC – primarily Trebbiano and Falanghina with up to 30% permitted to be Fiano and/or other local white grape varieties.

== Wine styles ==
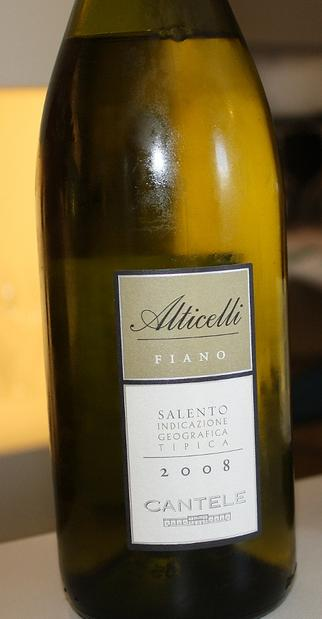
A Fiano IGT wine from the Salento peninsula of Apulia

According to Jancis Robinson, Fiano can produce an ageworthy wine that has the potential to develop in the bottle for several years after the vintage date. In its youth Fiano is often intensely flavored and aromatic with honey notes that over time develop more spicy and nutty notes. The advent of modern winemaking techniques with its emphasis on limiting oxidation and preserving freshness, have improved the overall quality of Fiano wines over the years. However, some producers that still practice more traditional winemaking techniques can still produce wines that come across as heavy and be prone to premature oxidation.

In the opinion of wine expert Oz Clarke, well made examples of Fiano from favorable vintages should have a fair amount of weight on the palate with a floral aroma and notes of honey and spice with the potential to continue improving with bottle age.

The Italian wine Fiano di Avellino is often characterized as a pale straw colored wine with strong aromas of spice and floral notes. On the palate, those aroma notes are often present along with honey and nutty hazelnut notes.

== Synonyms ==
Over the years Fiano and its wines have been known under various synonyms including Apiana, Apiano, Fiana, Fiano di Avellino, Fiore Mendillo, Foiano, Latina Bianca, Latina Bianca di Barletta, Latino, Latino Bianco, Minutola, Minutolo, and Santa Sofia.

== See also ==
- List of Italian grape varieties
