= Ottavino =

Ottavino may refer to:

== Surname ==
- Adam Ottavino (born 1985), American professional baseball player

== Musical instruments ==
- Ottavino, alternative name for the piccolo
- Ottavini, a miniature virginals

== See also ==
- Ottavinello, a red wine grape
