= Salice Salentino =

- Comune
- Comune di Salice Salentino
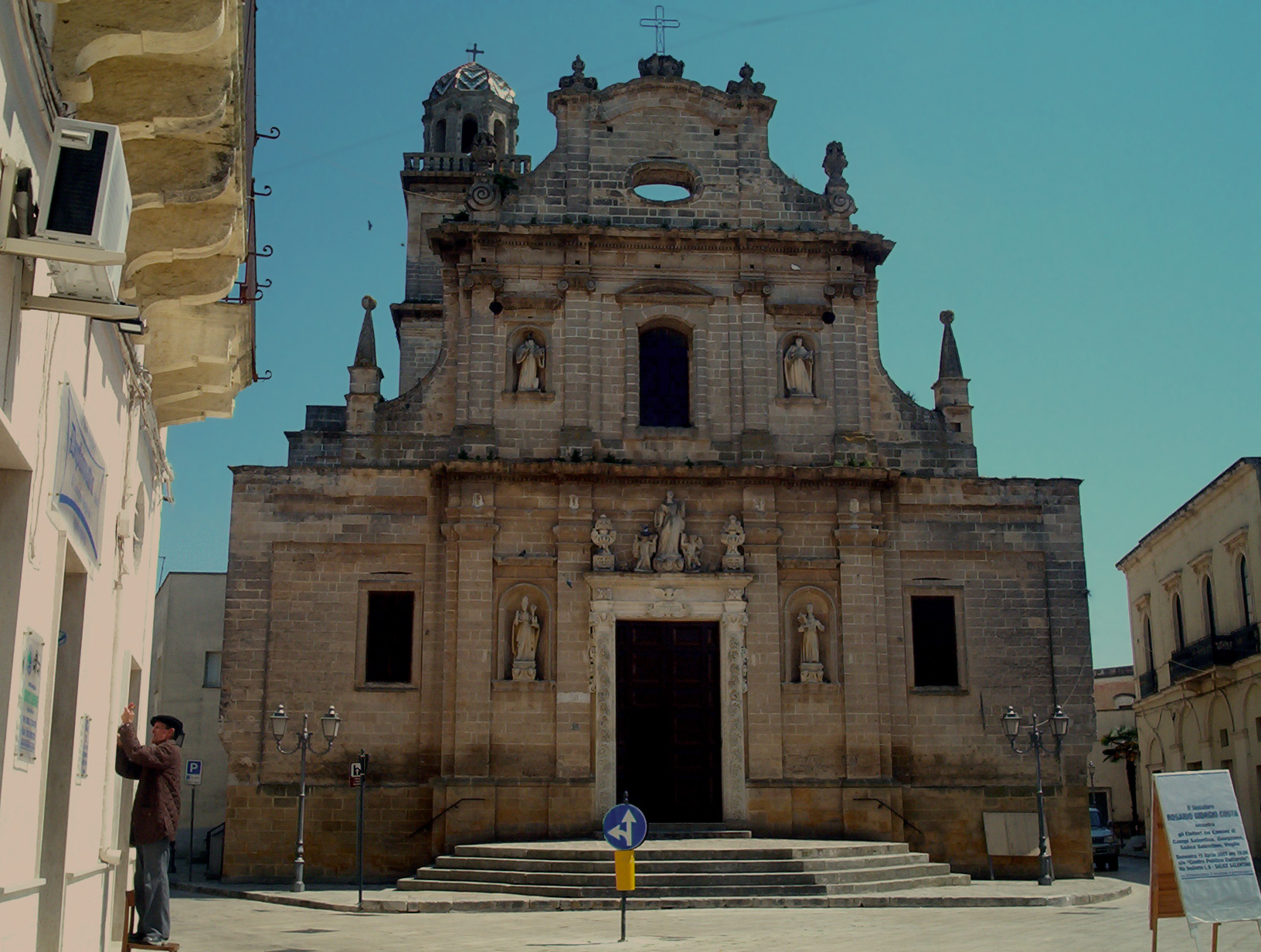
- Madre di Salice Salentino Church

- Location within Italy Location within Apulia
- Coordinates: 40°23′N 17°58′E
- Country: Italy
- Region: Apulia
- Province: Lecce (LE)

Government
  - Mayor: Antonio Rosato

Area
  - Total: 59.87 km^{2} (23.12 sq mi)
- Elevation: 49 m (161 ft)

Population (30 November 2018)
  - Total: 8,152
  - Density: 136.2/km^{2} (352.7/sq mi)
- Demonym: Salicesi
- Time zone: UTC+1 (CET)
  - Summer (DST): UTC+2 (CEST)
- Postal code: 73015
- Dialing code: 0832
- ISTAT code: 075065
- Patron saint: Francis of Assisi
- Saint day: Second Sunday of October
- Website: Official website

Salice Salentino is a small town and comune in the southern part of Apulia, Italy, in the Salento area. It is bounded by the province of Taranto to the northwest and the province of Brindisi to the north.

Main sights include the Chiesa Madre ("Mother Church") of Santa Maria Assunta (16th century) and the convent of the Friars Minor (1597-1597). Its coat of arms features a shield bearing a weeping willow and a golden crown as a crest.

== History ==
Founded by the prince Raimondo Orsini Del Balzo at the end of the 14th century, Salice Salentino owes its name to the willow trees that once used to grow and populate its muddy, clay soil. The prince constructed his residence, the "Casa del Re" (House of the King). It was later owned by the baron Zurlo in 1485. It was passed on to the marquis Albricci, Enriquez, prince of Squinzano, Filomarini, duke of Cutrofiano and della Torre.

== Economy ==
Its main economical activity is agriculture in the olive and wine industry.

It is a centre of production for Salice Salentino wine.
