= Bambino (ice-cream) =

Polish ice cream brand

Bambino is a basic type of ice cream first sold in the Polish People's Republic (PRL). It is shaped as a bar, served on a wooden stick. Many factories produced it, varying its packaging and recipe. The name comes from the Italian word "bambino", which means "child".

Since 1968 the product is produced by Łódź based Jogo dairy cooperative.

== History ==
The production of Bambino ice cream started in the early 1960s, after the Polish government acquired Danish machinery. The ice cream was available in cream, chocolate, strawberry and coffee flavors. It was available with chocolate frosting.

Customarily the ice cream was packed in brown, stiff paper and usually sold on the beach or street from white boxes filled with sawdust or artificial ice. Sellers used slogans to praise their products. For a long time, bambino was the only kind of ice cream on a stick sold in the country.

Today the packaging has been updated and is light brown and blue and features a polar bear.

== Calypso ==
A variation of bambino without the wooden stick was called Calypso. Sometimes it was served between two waffles. It was widely produced. The largest supplier was the State Cold Store in Gdańsk, today known as Lodmor. The wrapping included a profile of the head of a small woman of African descent next to the manufacturer's logo that depicted a sea lion.

== Cultural references ==
The song "Bambino Ice Cream" (Lody Bambino) was released by the band Diament. Bartek Koziczyński mentioned it in his book "333 popkultowe rzeczy. Lata 90". He emphasized the usefulness of the stick in home health prophylaxis: it was used instead of a spatula for throat examination.
