= Bombino nero =

Variety of grape

Bombino nero is a red Italian wine grape variety that is grown in southern Italy, particularly the regions of Apulia, Basilicata, and Lazio, as well as on the island of Sardinia. It is a permitted grape variety in the Denominazione di origine controllata (DOC) wines of Castel del Monte and Lizzano. The grape is primarily a blending grape but it can also be used as a varietal for red and rosé wines. Though DNA evidence has shown that Bombino nero is not a dark-berried color mutation of the similarly named Bombino bianco, ampelographers still believe that the two varieties are related in some way.

== History ==
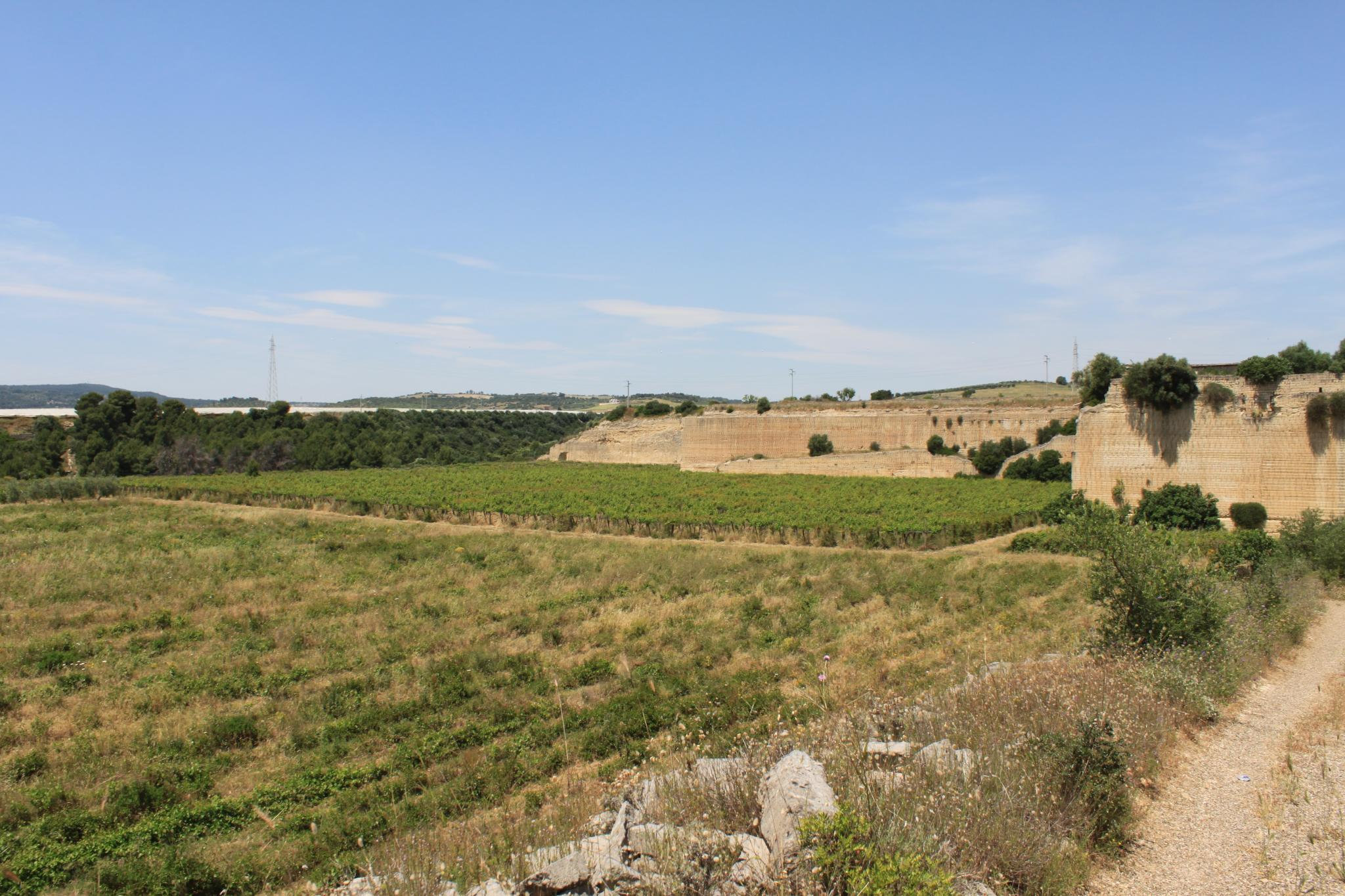
Most ampelographers believe Bombino nero and Bombino bianco probably originated in Apulia (vineyard there pictured)

The name "Bombino" means "small bomb" in Italian and probably comes from a description of the globular shape that the clusters of Bombino nero fruit can take. While DNA profiling has confirmed that Bombino nero is a variety distinct from Bombino bianco, evidence does point to the two varieties being related and probably sharing similar origins. While some early wine writers speculated that Bombino bianco may have had Spanish origins, most ampelographers today believe that both Bombino grapes probably originated in the Apulia region of south-eastern Italy.

== Viticulture and winemaking ==
Bombino nero is a late-ripening variety that is often one of the last red wine grapes to be harvested in a vintage intended for regular table wine and not sweet late harvest wines. The grape is very high phenolics, particularly anthocyanins, which has the potential to produce wines with a deep color though it more often sees only a short maceration time that produces lighter color wines. This is one reason why Bombino nero is often used in rosé production as it can quickly color the juice without requiring a long period of skin contact that can often also extract bitter tannins and other phenolics.

== Wine regions and DOC requirements ==
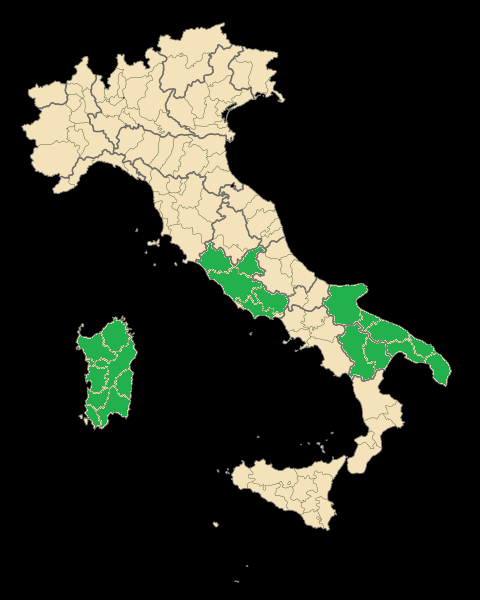
Regions of Italy where the Bombino nero is grown.

In the year 2000 there were 1,170 hectares (2,890 acres) of Bombino nero planted throughout Italy, most of it in the southern Italian wine region of Apulia. Here it is a permitted grape variety in the DOC wines of Castel del Monte in the province of Barletta-Andria-Trani and the Lizzano DOC in the Taranto province. Other vineyards of the grape can also be found in Basilicata, Lazio, and on the island of Sardinia.

In the Castel del Monte DOC, Bombino nero is usually used in the rosé wines, for which it can be used as a varietal or can be blended with Uva di Troia, so long as one or both of the varieties make up at least 65% of the wine. Montepulciano, Pinot noir, and Aglianico are permitted to provide the remainder of the blend. Bombino nero destined for DOC production needs to be harvested to a yield no greater than 14 tonnes per hectare, with the finished wine needing to attain a minimum alcohol level of at least 11%.

In Lizzano, Bombino nero can be blended in the predominantly Negroamaro-based red and rosé wines (60-80%) of the DOC along with Malvasia nera, Sangiovese, Montepulciano and Pinot noir as long as collectively those grapes do not make up more than 40% of the blend with Malvasia nera further restricted to accounting for no more than 10% of the blend. While mostly made a still wine, both the red and rosé can be produced in a semi-sparkling frizzante style. Bombino nero destined for DOC production in Lizzano needs to kept to a harvest maximum of 14 tonnes/ha with the finished wines at least 11.5% alcohol by volume.

In the Velletri DOC located in the province of Rome in Lazio, up to 10% of Bombino nero can be included (collectively along with Merlot and Ciliegiolo) in the predominantly Montepulciano (30-50%), Sangiovese (30-45%) and Cesanese Comune (minimum 15%) based red wines of the DOC. Bombino nero destined for DOC production here needs to be kept to yield no greater than 16 tonnes/ha with a minimum alcohol level of at least 11.5% for both regular and superiore bottlings.

== Styles ==
According to Master of Wine Jancis Robinson, Bombino nero tends to produce light-bodied wines that have soft, fruity flavors. The grape is often blended but can be used to produce varietal red and rosé wines.

== Synonyms ==
Over the years Bombino nero has been known under a variety of synonyms including: Bambino, Buonvino, Buonvino nero, Calatamuro nero and Cola Tamburo nero.
