= Brindisi Rosso =

Italian red wine

Brindisi Rosso is a red DOC (Denominazione di Origine Controllata) wine from the Southern Italian province of Brindisi, in the region of Apulia. The official appellation was granted on November 22, 1979, when a presidential decree was published in the Gazzetta Ufficiale dated April 23, 1980, after lobbying by the firm of Pasquale Medico & Sons and other producers. In recent years the production of this variety of wine has declined considerably (up to 50%), due to the uprooting of vines as a result of incentives from the EU, which has favoured other products. The province of Brindisi has a very long tradition of wine making, largely because Brindisi was the Roman gateway to the East and sold its wine to Rome along with salt and olive oil imported from the empire's Mediterranean provinces.

== Production ==
The production zone is limited to the areas of Brindisi and Mesagne, both being communes within the province of Brindisi. Brindisi Rosso is produced in small quantities and exported all over the world. Brindisi Rosso is made mainly from dark Negroamaro grapes (at least 70%) and Malvasia nera di Brindisi; it can also contain smaller quantities of Sussumaniello, Montepulciano and Sangiovese.

=== Characteristics ===
Brindisi Rosso wine appears intense ruby red, with light orange tones when aged; the taste is intense, dry, harmonious, with a lightly bitter aftertaste, velvety and appropriately tannic. Minimum alcohol percentage by volume to qualify for the appellation is 12%. The best vintages, however, contain between 13 and 14% ABV. The best recent vintages are 2000 and 2003. Wines classed as Brindisi Rosso Riserva must have a minimum alcohol content of 12.5% ABV, and must have been aged for at least 24 months.

== Rosato ==
Brindisi Rosato is a rosé Denominazione di Origine Controllata (DOC) wine from the Southern Italian province of Brindisi, in the region of Apulia. The official DOC appellation was granted on November 22, 1979, by a presidential decree published in the Gazzetta Ufficiale of April 23, 1980. The Brindisi region has a very old tradition of wine making, because Brindisi was the Roman gateway to the East and thus provided its own wine to Rome, along with salt and olive oil imported from the empire's Mediterranean provinces, especially Hispania.

=== Production ===
The production zone is limited to the areas of Brindisi and Mesagne, both being communes within the province of Brindisi. Brindisi Rosso is made mainly from Negroamaro grapes (at least 70%) and Malvasia nera di Brindisi; it can also contain smaller quantities of Sussumaniello, Montepulciano and Sangiovese.

=== Characteristics ===
Brindisi Rosato wine is coral-pink in colour, tending towards pale cherry-red; the smell is delicately fruity; the flavour is dry, harmonious, with a mild and agreeable bitterness. Minimum alcohol percentage by volume to qualify for the appellation is 12%. The minimum dry extract is 18%: by comparison, the red Brindisi Rosso must have a minimum dry extract of 24%.
