= Cesanese Comune =

Variety of grape

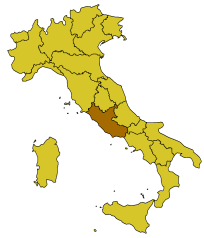
The Lazio region of Italy where Cesanese is almost exclusively grown.

Cesanese Comune (more commonly known as just Cesanese) is a red Italian wine grape variety that is grown primarily in the Lazio region. The grape has three Denominazione di origine controllata (DOC) regions dedicated to it-Cesanese di Affile DOC, Cesanese di Olevano DOC and Cesanese di Piglio DOC. Cesanese di Affile appears to be a distinct sub-variety of Cesanese Comune unique to the commune of Affile. (much like Brunello is a unique clone of Sangiovese unique to commune of Montalcino) There are noticeable differences between Cesanese Comune and the grapes found in Cesanese di Affile, including the size of the grape berry itself. The sub-variety Cesanese d'Affile is considered to be of superior quality of Cesanese Comune and is used as minor ingredient in the Tuscan cult wine Trinoro. The grape has very old origins, and may have been used in Roman winemaking. Today it is rarely seen outside of the Lazio.

== History ==
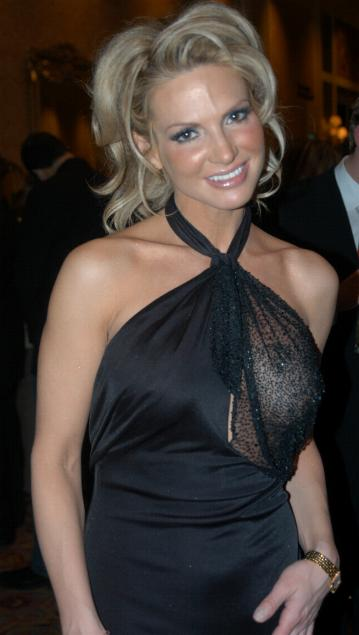
In the 2000s, the Cesanese grape came into the news due to its inclusion in the debut wine of American porn star Savanna Samson which earned favorable ratings among wine critics.

Cesanese Comune has had a long history in the Lazio regions with ampelographers believing the grape to be indigenous to the region. While it may have been used in Roman winemaking, in recent centuries the grape has been on a steady decline. By 2000 there were less than 2,500 acres (1,000 hectares) of the grape planted in Italy. The grape's decline has coincided with the general decline of viticulture in the Lazio region as urban sprawl and more of the population shift from agriculture to more industrial enterprises.

In the 2000s, the Cesanese variety earned publicity for being included in the debut wine Sogno Uno by American porn star Savanna Samson. For her first foray into the wine industry, Samson sampled 80 Italian wines before deciding to base her first wine primarily on the rare Lazio grape. Her 2004 Sogno Uno, which earned a favorable 91pt rating from American wine critic Robert Parker, was composed of 70% Cesanese, 20% Sangiovese and 10% Montepulciano.

== Wine regions ==
Cesanese Comune is almost exclusively planted in the Lazio region of Italy, and has long been associated with the ancient town and comune of Anagni. It is planted throughout the hills of southeast Latium in the province of Frosinone which has been sub-divided into three DOC regions. The Cesanese di Affile DOC is located around the commune of Affile in the province of Rome, though the sub-variety of Cesanese di Affile has migrated north to southern Tuscany. The Cesanese di Olevano is also located in the province of Rome around the city of Olevano Romano. The mountainous vineyards of the Cesanese di Piglio DOC, centered around the Piglio commune in the province of Frosinone, is considered by wine experts such as Master of Wine Mary Ewing-Mulligan to produce the best quality Cesanese wine but viticulture in the area has declined due to the difficulties in cultivating such mountainous terrain.

== Wines ==
Traditionally Cesanese was used to make sweet red wines that ranged from slightly sparkling frizzante to fully sparkling spumante styles. In the late 20th century more winemakers began making dry still wines from the grape variety. Under DOC regulations, any wine labeled as Cesanese must contain at least 90% of the grape variety in the wine. Among the other grape varieties permitted to fill in the remaining 10% of the blend are both red and white grapes-Sangiovese, Montepulciano, Barbera, Trebbiano Toscano and Bambino bianco.

Wines made Cesanese are described as light bodied and soft, often recommended to be enjoyed soon after release. Wines from the Cesanese di Affile DOC may have a slight bitter edge.

== Synonyms ==
Among the synonyms that Cesanese is known under include Bambino, Bombino nero, Bonvino nero, Bonvino, Cesanese, Cesanese ad acino grosso, Cesanese nero, Cesanese velletrano, Cesanze nero, Ferrigno nero, Ferrigno, Mangiatoria, Nero Ferrigno, Sancinella and Sanginella.
