= Bellone =

Variety of grape

Bellone is a white Italian wine grape variety that wine historians believed was cultivated in Roman times. By 1990, nearly 3,000 hectares (7,400 acres) of the variety was still being cultivated and eligible to be blended in the wines of several Latium Denominazione di origine controllatas (DOCs). According to wine expert Jancis Robinson, Bellone produces a juicy white wine.

Bellone is the principal white grape in Bianco blends in Cori, Marino, Nettuno, and Roma DOCs and a dozen IGPs. It is also an allowed blending component in more famous Italian white wines such as Frascati (max 30%). It is primarily grown in Lazio and Umbria.

== Synonyms ==
Among the synonyms that Bellone has been known under: Albanese, Arciprete, Arcipreto, Bello buono, Bello cacchione, Bello cencioloso, Bello cera, Bello fagotte, Bello fagotto, Bello gentile, Bello palloccone, Bello piccolitto, Bello romanesco, Bello romano, Bello terrigno, Bello veltrano, Bello verdone, Cacchione, Ciciniello, Pampanoro, Pantrastico, Pociccone, Pocioccone, Uva pane, Uva pantastico, Uva presta and Zinna Vacca.
