= Negroamaro =

Variety of grape

- Grape (Vitis)
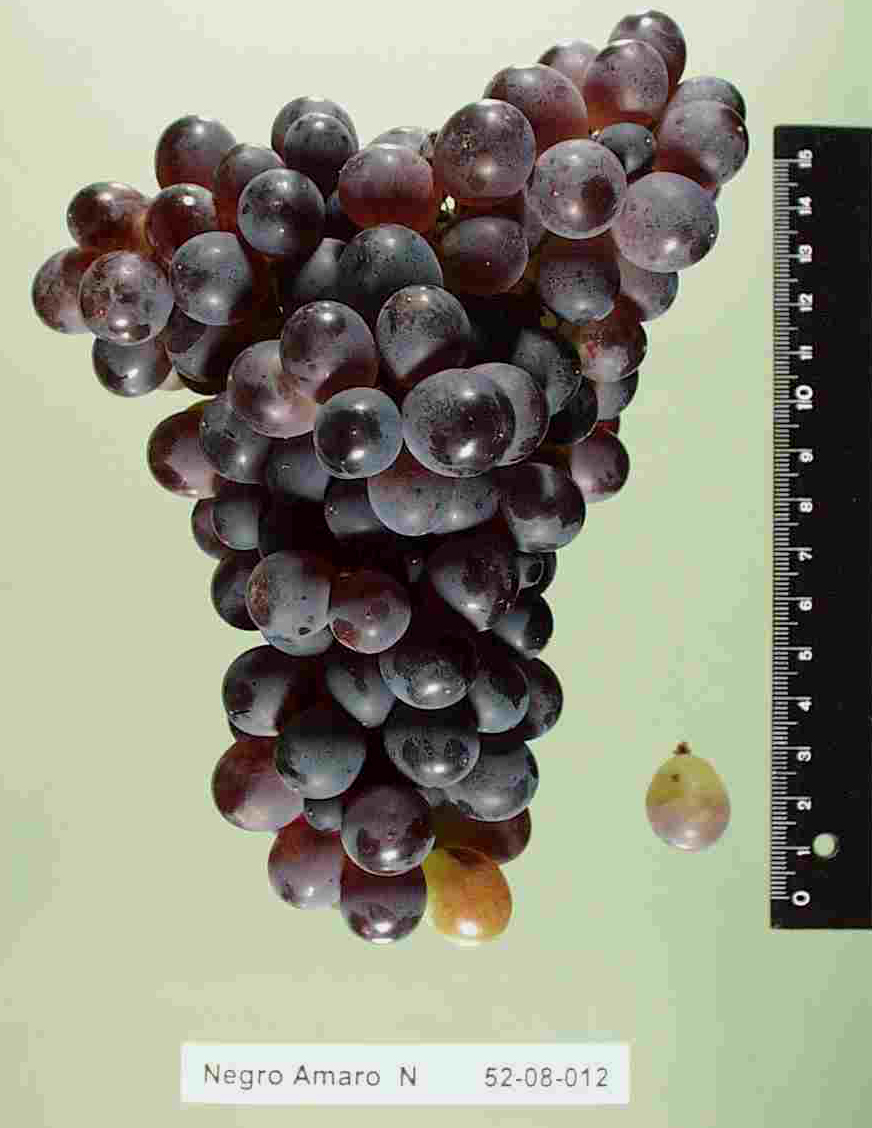
- Species: Vitis vinifera
- Also called: Ne(g)ro Amaro, Abruzzese (more)
- Origin: Italy
- Notable regions: Apulia
- VIVC number: 8456

Negroamaro (seldom Negro amaro; meaning "black [and] bitter") is a red wine grape variety native to southern Italy. It is grown almost exclusively in Apulia and particularly in Salento, the peninsula which can be visualised as the "heel" of Italy. The grape can produce wines very deep in color. Wines made from Negroamaro tend to be very rustic in character, combining perfume with an earthy bitterness. The grape produces some of the best red wines of Apulia, particularly when blended with the highly scented Malvasia Nera, as in the case of Salice Salentino.

== History and Etymology ==
While negro is from an Italian and Latin word meaning "black", there is some dispute as to whether amaro is from the Italian word for "bitter" or whether it derives from the ancient Greek mavro also meaning "black". If the latter theory is correct, mavro may share a root with merum, a wine brought to Apulia by Illyrian colonists before the Greeks arrived in the 7th century BC. Horace and other Roman writers mention mera tarantina from Taranto, and Pliny the Elder describes Manduria as viticulosa (full of vineyards). But after the fall of the Roman Empire winemaking declined until it was only kept alive in the monasteries - Benedictine on Murgia and Greek Orthodox in Salento. Negroamaro could be the grape used in merum, or it could have been brought by traders from the home of wine-making in Asia Minor at any point in the last 8,000 years.

Negroamaro precoce has recently been identified as a distinct clone.

RAPD analysis suggests that the cultivar is loosely related to Verdicchio (Verdeca) and Sangiovese.

== Distribution and wines ==
The grapes are used exclusively for wine-making. Although 100% varietal wines are produced, Negroamaro is more commonly used as the dominant component of a blend including such varieties as Malvasia Nera, Sangiovese or Montepulciano. The most common version of these wines is red, however also rosato versions are gaining traction and some white versions are also present. Moreover, they are usually still and more rarely frizzante.

== List of permitted DOC wines ==
Source 85%–100% Negroamaro:

- in the province of Lecce
  - Leverano Negroamaro Rosato
  - Leverano Negroamaro Rosso
- in the province of Taranto
  - Lizzano Negroamaro Rosato
  - Lizzano Negroamaro Rosso
  - Lizzano Negroamaro Rosso Superiore

85%–100% Negroamaro:

- in the province of Lecce
  - Alezio Riserva
  - Alezio Rosato
  - Alezio Rosso
  - Nardo' Rosato
  - Nardo' Rosso
  - Nardo' Rosso Riserva
- in the provinces of Brindisi and Lecce
  - Salice Salentino
  - Salice Salentino Rosato
  - Salice Salentino Rosso
  - Salice Salentino Rosso Riserva

70%–100% Negroamaro:

- in the province of Brindisi
  - Brindisi Rosato
  - Brindisi Rosso
  - Brindisi Rosso Riserva
- in the province of Lecce
  - Copertino Rosato
  - Copertino Rosso
  - Copertino Rosso Riserva
  - Matino Rosato
  - Matino Rosso
- in the provinces of Brindisi and Lecce
  - Squinzano Rosato
  - Squinzano Rosso
  - Squinzano Rosso Riserva

65%–100% Negroamaro:

- in the province of Lecce
  - Galatina Rosso

60%–80% Negroamaro:

- in the province of Taranto
  - Lizzano
  - Lizzano Rosato
  - Lizzano Rosato Frizzante
  - Lizzano Rosato Giovane
  - Lizzano Rosato Spumante
  - Lizzano Rosso
  - Lizzano Rosso Frizzante
  - Lizzano Rosso Giovane

50%–100% Negroamaro:

- in the province of Lecce
  - Leverano Novello
  - Leverano Rosato
  - Leverano Rosso
  - Leverano Rosso Riserva

15%–30% Negroamaro:

- in the province of Foggia
  - Rosso di Cerignola
  - Rosso di Cerignola Riserva

=== List of permitted IGT wines ===
Source 85%–100% Negroamaro:

- Puglia Negroamaro
- Puglia Negroamaro frizzante
- Puglia Negroamaro novello
- Valle d’Itria Negroamaro
- Valle d’Itria Negroamaro frizzante
- Valle d’Itria Negroamaro novello
- Salento Negroamaro
- Salento Negroamaro frizzante
- Salento Negroamaro novello
- Daunia Negroamaro
- Daunia Negroamaro frizzante

70%–100% Negroamaro:

- Salento Rosato Negroamaro
- Salento Rosato Negroamaro frizzante

70%–80% Negroamaro:

- Tarantino Negroamaro
- Tarantino Negroamaro frizzante

== Vine and viticulture ==
The vine is vigorous and high-yielding with a preference for calcareous and limey soils but adapting readily to others. It is well suited to Puglia’s hot summers and exhibits good drought resistance. The grapes, carried in bunches of around 300–350 g, are oval in form, medium-large in size with thick skins, and black-violet in colour. They ripen mid-season (late September–early October). The first American producer of Negroamaro is Chiarito Vineyards in Ukiah, California (Mendocino County).

== Synonyms ==
Abbruzzese, Abruzzese, Albese, Amaro Nero, Amaronero, Arbese, Arbise, Jonico, Lacrima, Lacrimo, Mangia Verde, Mangiaverde, Mangiaverme, Morese, Negra Della Lorena, Negramaro, Nero Amaro, Nero Leccese, Nicra Amaro, Niuri Maru, Niuru Maru, San Lorenzo, San Marzuno, Uva cane.

== See also ==
- Primitivo, a similar grape from the region better known in USA as Zinfandel.
