= Braico =

Braico is a surname. Notable people with the name include:

- Alexandr Braico (born 1988), Moldovan racing cyclist
- Cesare Braico (1816–1887), Italian patriot, doctor, and politician
