= Battle of Brindisi (1156) =

Battle in Italy in 1156

- Part of Byzantine–Norman Wars
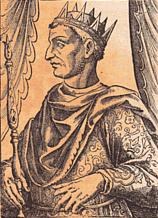
- William I of Sicily
Date	28 May 1156
Location	Brindisi
Result	Sicilian victory

Belligerents
Byzantine Empire	Kingdom of Sicily

Commanders and leaders
John Doukas; Robert of Loritello; Alexios Komnenos	William I

The Battle of Brindisi (1156) was fought by the Byzantine Empire and the Kingdom of Sicily over control of Southern Italy.

The battle was part of a Byzantine campaign orchestrated by the emperor Manuel I Komnenos to recover Apulia and Calabria for the Byzantine Empire by taking advantage of the chaotic political situation in Norman Sicily following the death of Roger II and the succession of William 'the Bad'. While the Byzantine forces managed to take control of numerous southern Italian cities, including Bari, the defeat at Brindisi, inflicted at the end of a protracted Byzantine siege of the city, effectively put an end to the Byzantine attempt at reconquest.

Following the defeat, the Byzantine diplomat Alexios Axouch arrived at the Byzantine base of Ancona in order to negotiate a favorable treaty with William. He was incredibly successful, and his negotiations allowed Manuel to exit the war with honor, despite a series of large-scale, successful Norman raids of the Aegean coasts of Greece and the consolidation of Norman Sicily under William.

== Sources ==
- Magdalino, Paul (2002) [1993]. The Empire of Manuel I Komnenos, 1143–1180. Cambridge: Cambridge University Press. ISBN 0-521-52653-1.
