= Oscar Nuccio =

Italian historian (1931–2004)

Oscar Nuccio (Brindisi, 9 July 1931 – Rieti, 23 April 2004) was an Italian historian of economic thought. He taught the history of economic thought in the departments of political science at the University of Pisa, the University of Teramo, and Sapienza University of Rome, always as an associate professor, as he was never awarded tenure.

He penned over 200 academic publications between 1957 and 2008, focusing his studies on the birth of Italian economic thought. A practicing Roman Catholic, he opposed Max Weber's thesis, arguing that the root of market capitalism is not to be found in the Protestant Reformation but in the reaction by lawyers and humanists to the framing of economic issues under scholasticism. This thesis is developed in particular in his 1999 work Goodbye Protestant Ethics.

His most important work was Italian Economic Thought, a three-volume, seven-book work which covered the eleventh to the eighteenth centuries and won the Saint-Vincent Prize for the Economy in 1985. The work was summarized in the 700 pages of A History of Italian Economic Thought (As a Genesis of the Capitalist Spirit), published posthumously in 2008 by the LUISS University Press (Rome) and also available in English. In 1987 the study Economic Epistemology: the role of the concepts of 'nature' and 'natural law' in the genesis of the economic won the "Seventy-fifth Prize" awarded by the Review of Economic Policy. Nuccio followed that major work in 2000 with the study False and Commonplace in History: the equation of the Protestant ethic and the spirit of capitalism, published by Alberti (Florence).

Nuccio also managed the anastatic reprinting of about thirty classics of the nineteenth century in the collection Italian Classic Writers of Political Economy, or the "Custodi Collection" (in fifty volumes).
