= Benita Sciarra =

Italian archaeologist

Benita Sciarra (1926 - 1993) was an Italian archaeologist and director of the 'Francesco Ribezzo' Archaeology Museum in Brindisi. She specialised in leading underwater archaeological investigations along the Brindisi coast, which led to discoveries such as the bronzes of Punta del Serrone, and in the archaeology surrounding Brindisi.

== Education and early career ==
Benita Sciarra was born in Brindisi in 1926. She graduated from the University of Bari with a degree in Ancient Literature, with a thesis La chiesa di San Giovanni al sepolcro in Brindisi (The Church of San Giovanni of the sepulcher in Brindisi). From 1956-1957 she taught art history at the high school B. Marzolla in Brindisi. In 1965 she undertook a professional training in archaeology at the Fondazione Lerici.

== Archaeological work ==
Sciarra held the assistant chair of Christian archaeology at the Institute of History of Art and Christian Archaeology at the University of Bari, from 1963 to 1973. In 1968, while in this role she started to undertake a wide range of underwater archaeological investigations with the Institute of Ligurian Studies, which she continued until 1984. In 1973 she was appointed director of the Francesco Ribezzo Museum. During this time she undertook her work on the kilns of Apani and Giancola and their relationships to the economic development of Brindisi in the Roman period.

== Awards and associations ==
Sciarra became a member of the Ordine Nazionale dei Giornalisti in 1984 and also a member of the scientific advisory committee for the journal “Archeologia Viva”. She was appointed to the board of the National Association of Italian Museums, and the International Council of Museums in 1988.

He was featured in an exhibition of notable women in Brindisi 'Per Amore, per Professione e per Diletto... Le scritture delle donne in Terra di Brindisi (secc. XVI-XX)' in 2006. A volume 'Scritti di Antichita in Memoria di Benita Sciarra Bardaro' was published in her honour in 1994.

Sciarra died at Mesagne in 1993.

== Publications ==
- Sciarra, B. (1962) La chiesa di S. Giovanni del Sepolcro in Brindisi, Galatina (Lecce) : Congedo
- Sciarra, B. (1966) Brindisi e il suo museo, Brindisi: Montesud petrochimica
- Sciarra, B. (1967) 'Scavi e scoperte nell’area urbana di Brindisi', RicSt-Brind 3: 77-86.
- Sciarra, B. (1974) I musei archeologici della provincia di Brindisi, Bari : Adda
- Sciarra, B.; Sciarra, C. (1981) Il sistema difensivo a Brindisi, Galatina (Lecce): Congedo
- Sciarra, B.; Marangio, C.; and A. Nitti (1994) Scritti di Antichita in Memoria di Benita Sciarra Bardaro, Fasano (Brindisi): Schena
