= Gianluca Di Giulio =

Italian footballer

Personal information
- Date of birth: 17 February 1972 (age 54)
- Place of birth: Brindisi, Italy
- Height: 1.78 m (5 ft 10 in)
- Position: Midfielder

Youth career
- Brindisi

Senior career*
Years	Team	Apps	(Gls)
1990–1993	Brindisi	85	(8)
1993–1995	Trani	40	(1)
1995–1998	Castrovillari	97	(3)
1998–2001	Benevento	97	(5)
2001–2006	Rimini	144	(7)
2006–2007	Verona	10	(0)
2007	→ Gallipoli (loan)	8	(0)
- * Club domestic league appearances and goals

Gianluca Di Giulio (born 17 February 1972) is a former Italian footballer. He played for Benevento, Rimini and Verona.

Di Giulio joined Hellas Verona F.C. in June 2006 on free transfer. He left for Gallipoli in January 2007. In December 2007 he terminated his contract with Verona.
