= Brindisi =

City in Apulia, Italy

Brindisi Brìnnisi
- Comune
- Comune di Brindisi
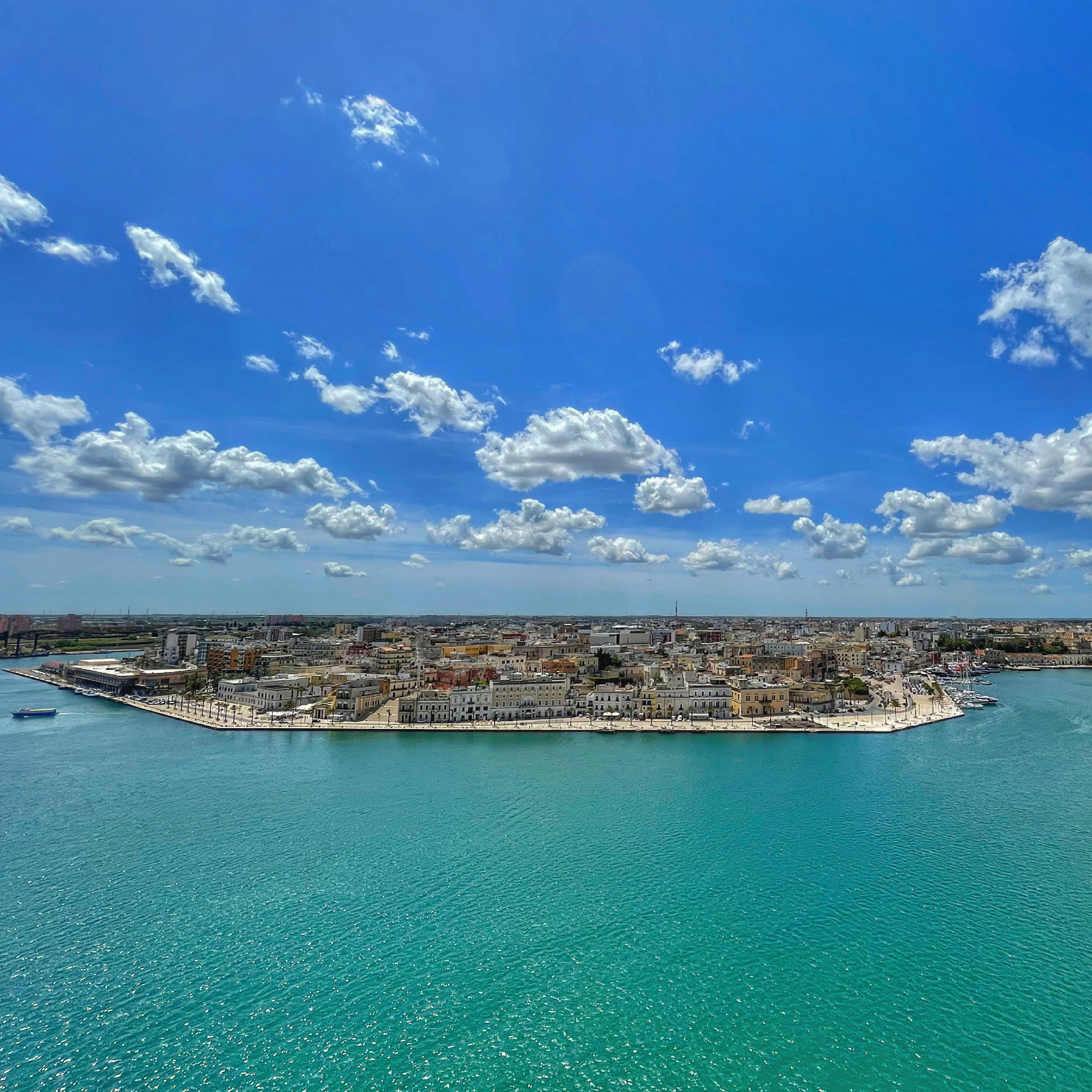
- View of Brindisi

- Flag Coat of arms

- Location within Italy Location within Apulia
- Coordinates: 40°38′N 17°56′E
- Country: Italy
- Region: Apulia
- Province: Brindisi (BR)
- Frazioni: Tuturano

Government
  - Mayor: Giuseppe Marchionna

Area
  - Total: 332.98 km^{2} (128.56 sq mi)
- Elevation: 15 m (49 ft)

Population (31 December 2017)
  - Total: 87,141
  - Density: 261.70/km^{2} (677.80/sq mi)
- Demonym: Brindisini
- Time zone: UTC+1 (CET)
  - Summer (DST): UTC+2 (CEST)
- Postal code: 72100
- Dialing code: 0831
- Patron saint: Theodore of Amasea and Lawrence of Brindisi
- Saint day: First Sunday in September
- Website: comune.brindisi.it

UNESCO World Heritage Site
- Part of: Via Appia. Regina Viarum
- Criteria: Cultural: iii, iv, vi
- Reference: 1708-015
- Inscription: 2024 (46th Session)

Brindisi (US: /ˈbrɪndɪzi, ˈbriːn-/ BRIN-diz-ee, BREEN-; Italian: [ˈbrindizi]; Brindisino: Brìnnisi) (Note: Latin: Brundisium; Ancient Greek: Βρεντέσιον, romanized: Brentésion; Messapic: Brunda.) is a city in the region of Apulia in southern Italy, the capital of the province of Brindisi, on the coast of the Adriatic Sea. Historically, the city has played an essential role in trade and culture due to its strategic position on the Italian Peninsula and its natural port on the Adriatic Sea. The city remains a major port for trade with the Balkan Peninsula, Greece and the Middle East. Its industries include agriculture, chemical works, and the generation of electricity.

From September 1943 to February 1944, Brindisi was the provisional government seat of the Kingdom of Italy.

== Etymology ==
The name Brindisi derives from the Latin Brundisium, which itself comes through the Greek Brentesion (Βρεντέσιον) from the Messapic Brention, meaning "head of a stag". This likely refers to the shape of the natural harbour, which resembles the head or antlers of a stag.

The root is related to the Albanian words bri, brî (plural: brini, brirë, brinë), meaning "horn" or "antler", from late Proto-Albanian *brina < earlier *brena.

== History ==
=== Ancient times ===
Several traditions concern its founders; one claims it was founded by the legendary hero Diomedes. The geographer Strabo says that it was colonized from Knossos in Crete.

Brindisi was originally a Messapian settlement predating the Roman expansion. The Latin name Brundisium, through the Greek Brentesion, is a corruption of the Messapian Brention meaning "deer's head" and probably referring to the shape of the natural harbour. According to other sources, in 267 BC (245 BC), it was conquered by the Romans and became a Latin colony. The peninsula of the Punta lands, which is located in the outer harbor, has been identified as a Bronze Age village (16th century BC) where a group of huts, protected by a barrier of stones, yielded fragments of Mycenaean pottery. Herodotus spoke of the Mycenaean origin of these populations. The necropolis of Tor Pisana (south of the old town of Brindisi) returned Corinthian jars in the first half of the 7th century BC. The Brindisi Messapia certainly entertained strong business relationships with the opposite side of the Adriatic and the Greek populations of the Aegean Sea.

After the Punic Wars, it became a major center of Roman naval power and maritime trade. In the Social War, it received Roman citizenship and was made a free port by Sulla. It suffered, however, from a siege conducted by Caesar in 49 BC, part of Caesar's Civil War (Bell. Civ. i.) and was again attacked in 42 and 40 BC, with the latter giving rise to the Treaty of Brundisium between Octavian, Mark Antony and Lepidus in the autumn of the same year.

The poet Pacuvius was born here about 220 BC, and here the famous poet Virgil died in 19 BC. Under the Romans, Brundisium – a large city in its day with some 100,000 inhabitants – was an active port, the chief point of embarkation for Greece and the East, via Dyrrachium or Corcyra. It was connected with Rome by the Via Appia and the Via Traiana. The termination of the Via Appia, at the water's edge, was formerly flanked by two fine pillars. Only one remains, the second being misappropriated and removed to the neighbouring town of Lecce.

=== Middle Ages and modern times ===
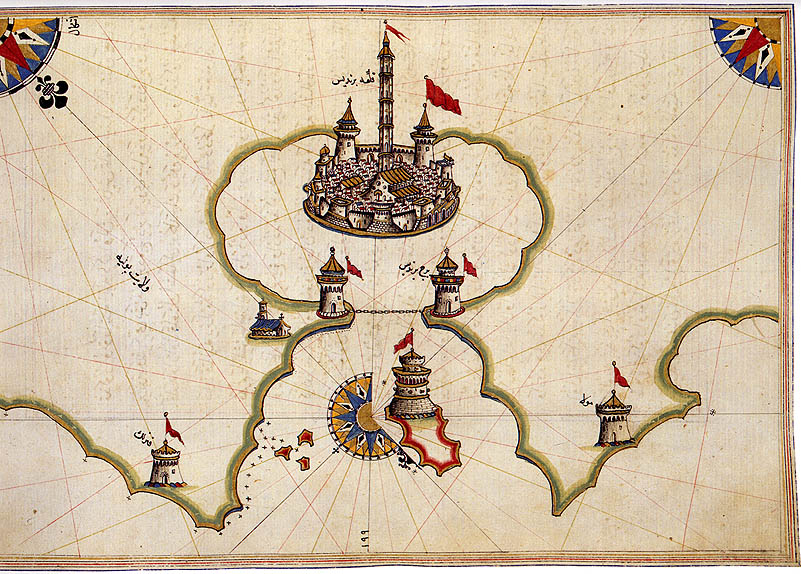
16th century map of Brindisi by Piri Reis

Later, Brindisi was conquered by the Ostrogoths and reconquered by the Byzantine Empire in the 6th century AD. In 674, it was destroyed by the Lombards led by Romuald I of Benevento, but such a fine natural harbor meant that the city was soon rebuilt. In the 9th century, a Saracen settlement existed in the city's neighborhood, stormed in 836 by pirates.

In 1070, it was conquered by the Normans and became part of the Principality of Taranto and the Duchy of Apulia, and was the first rule of the Counts of Conversano. After the baronial revolt of 1132, owned by the will of Roger II of Sicily, the city recovered some of the splendor of the past during the period of the Crusades, when it regained the Episcopal See, saw the construction of the new cathedral and a castle with an essential new arsenal, and became a privileged port for the Holy Land. In 1156, a siege of Brindisi by the Byzantine Empire ended in a battle in which the besiegers were decisively defeated by the Sicilian Normans, ending the Byzantines' hopes of conquering Southern Italy.

It was in the cathedral of Brindisi that the wedding of King Roger III of Sicily took place. Emperor Frederick II married Queen Isabella II of Jerusalem on 9 November 1225 here and started from the port of Brindisi in 1227 for the Sixth Crusade. Frederick II erected a castle, with massive round towers, to guard the inner harbour; it later became a convict prison. Like other Pugliese ports, Brindisi, for a short while, was ruled by Venice, but was soon reconquered by Spain.

A plague devastated Brindisi in 1348; it was plundered in 1352 and 1383; and an earthquake struck the city in 1456.

Brindisi fell to Austrian rule in 1707–1734 and afterward to the Bourbons.

Between September 1943 and February 1944, the city functioned as Italy's temporary government seat and hosted King Victor Emmanuel III, Pietro Badoglio, and a part of the Italian armed forces command in September 1943 after the armistice with Italy.

In the 21st century, Brindisi is the home base of the San Marco Regiment, a marine brigade originally known as the La Marina Regiment. It was renamed San Marco after its noted defense of Venice during the Second Battle of the Piave River.

On 19 May 2012, a bomb made of three gas cylinders, detonated in front of a vocational school in Brindisi, killing a 16-year-old female student.

== Geography ==
Brindisi is situated on a natural harbour, that penetrates deeply into the Adriatic coast of Apulia. Within the arms of the outer harbour islands are Pedagne, a tiny archipelago, currently not open and in use for military purposes (United Nations Group Schools used it during the intervention in Bosnia). The entire municipality is part of the Brindisi Plain, characterised by high agricultural uses of its land. It is located in the northeastern part of the Salento plains, about 40 kilometres (25 mi) from the Itria Valley and the low Murge. The Natural Marine Reserve of the World Wide Fund for Nature of Torre Guaceto is close to the city. The Ionian Sea is about 45 kilometres (28 mi) away.

=== Territory ===
The territory of Brindisi is characterised by a wide flat area from which emerge sub-deposits of limestone and sand of marine origin, which in turn have a deeper level clay of the Pleistocene era and an even later Mesozoic carbonate composed of limestone and soils. The development of agriculture has caused an increase in the use of water resources, increasing indiscriminate use.

=== Climate ===
Brindisi experiences a Mediterranean climate (Köppen: Csa). Summers are hot and dry with abundant sunshine. Summer heat indexes can be regularly over 30 °C (86 °F) and occasionally as high as 37 °C (99 °F) during July and August. Winters are mild with moderate rainfall. Brindisi and the mostly topographically flat Salento peninsula are subject to light winds most of the year. The two main winds in Salento are the Maestral and the Scirocco. The northerly Maestral wind from the Adriatic Sea is cooling, moderating summer heat and increasing winter wind chill. The southerly Scirocco wind from the Sahara brings higher temperatures and humidity to Salento. During spring and autumn, Sirocco winds can bring thunderstorms, occasionally dropping red sand from the Sahara in the region. Snow is rare in Brindisi but occurred during the January 2017 cold spell, bringing snow and ice to much of southern Italy.

Climate data for Brindisi, elevation: 15 m or 49 ft, 1991–2020 normals, extremes 1932–present
Month	Jan	Feb	Mar	Apr	May	Jun	Jul	Aug	Sep	Oct	Nov	Dec	Year
Record high °C (°F)	22.0 (71.6)	23.0 (73.4)	27.0 (80.6)	28.2 (82.8)	35.4 (95.7)	43.4 (110.1)	44.4 (111.9)	43.8 (110.8)	39.6 (103.3)	31.6 (88.9)	27.0 (80.6)	22.5 (72.5)	44.4 (111.9)
Mean daily maximum °C (°F)	13.2 (55.8)	13.5 (56.3)	15.7 (60.3)	18.5 (65.3)	22.7 (72.9)	27.6 (81.7)	29.5 (85.1)	29.9 (85.8)	26.4 (79.5)	22.1 (71.8)	18.1 (64.6)	14.3 (57.7)	20.9 (69.6)
Daily mean °C (°F)	9.9 (49.8)	10.1 (50.2)	12.1 (53.8)	14.7 (58.5)	18.8 (65.8)	23.1 (73.6)	25.7 (78.3)	26.1 (79.0)	22.6 (72.7)	18.6 (65.5)	14.7 (58.5)	11.2 (52.2)	17.3 (63.1)
Mean daily minimum °C (°F)	6.5 (43.7)	6.6 (43.9)	8.4 (47.1)	10.7 (51.3)	14.8 (58.6)	19.1 (66.4)	21.8 (71.2)	22.2 (72.0)	18.7 (65.7)	15.1 (59.2)	11.3 (52.3)	7.8 (46.0)	13.6 (56.5)
Record low °C (°F)	−6.4 (20.5)	−2.6 (27.3)	−4.2 (24.4)	0.8 (33.4)	5.1 (41.2)	9.8 (49.6)	12.4 (54.3)	13.6 (56.5)	9.0 (48.2)	4.0 (39.2)	0.4 (32.7)	−2.5 (27.5)	−6.4 (20.5)
Average precipitation mm (inches)	62.0 (2.44)	89.3 (3.52)	52.7 (2.07)	47.6 (1.87)	28.9 (1.14)	14.3 (0.56)	13.8 (0.54)	13.0 (0.51)	57.3 (2.26)	67.9 (2.67)	106.5 (4.19)	67.6 (2.66)	620.8 (24.44)
Average precipitation days (≥ 1.0 mm)	7.2	6.9	6.3	6.2	4.0	2.1	1.4	1.7	4.7	5.1	7.3	7.9	60.8
Average relative humidity (%)	76.6	75.9	75.0	74.7	74.6	72.2	71.0	72.0	72.8	75.9	77.9	77.4	74.7
Mean monthly sunshine hours	148.5	155.4	210.5	227.7	286.4	312.0	344.4	321.2	245.7	202.7	146.7	140.7	2,742
Source 1: NOAA
Source 2: Temperature estreme in Toscana

== Main sights ==
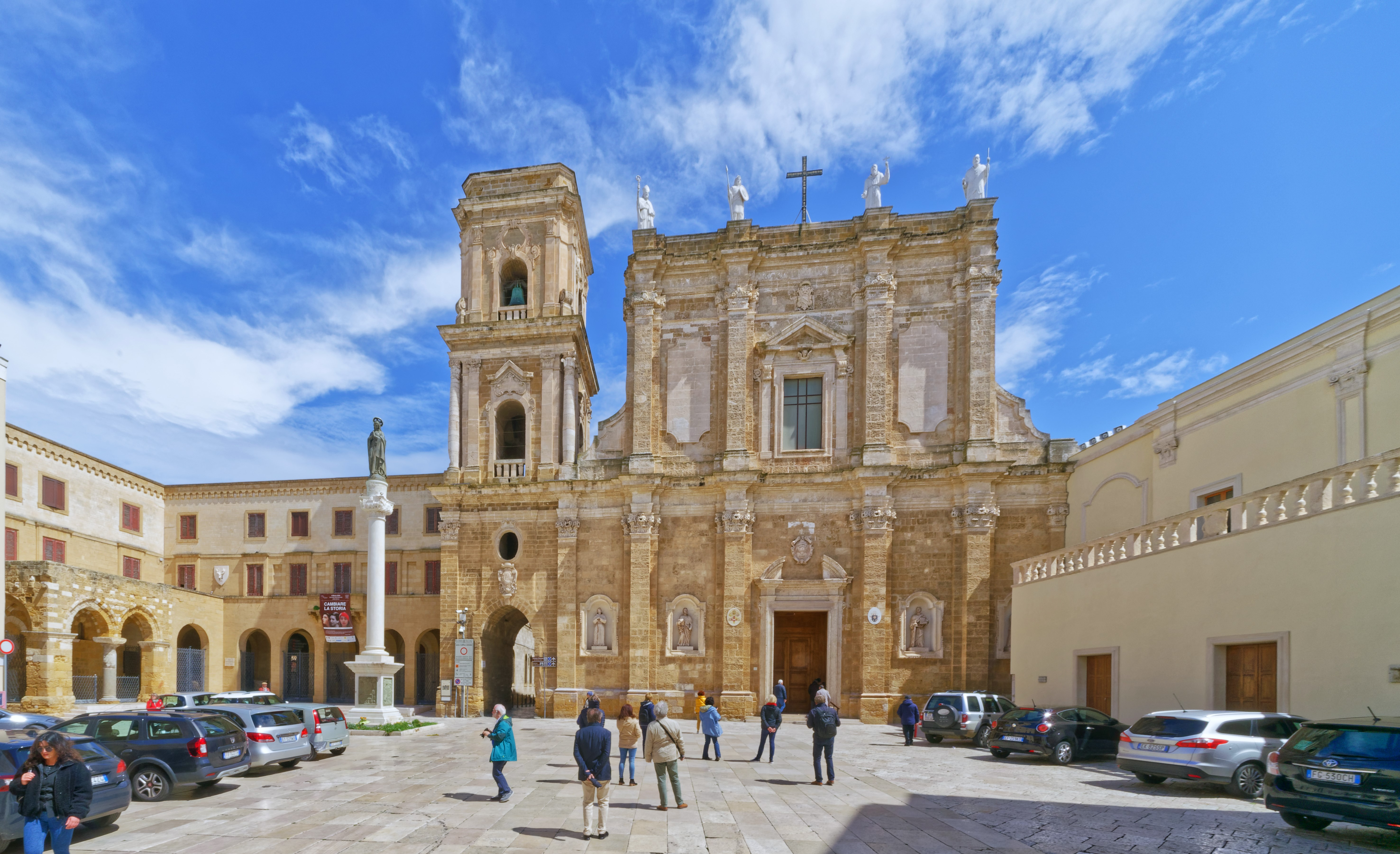
Brindisi Cathedral

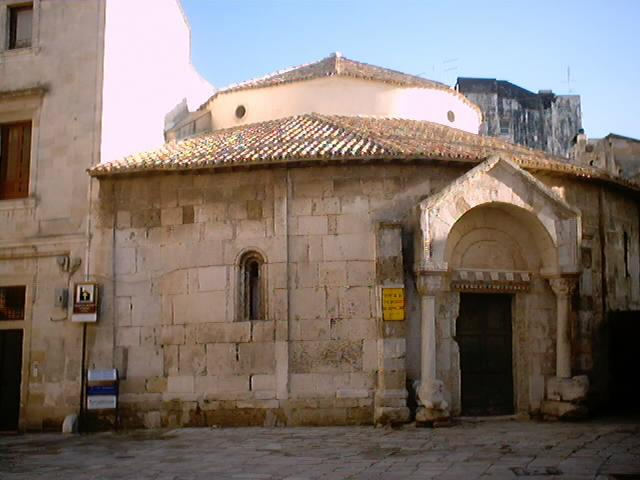
Church of San Giovanni al Sepolcro

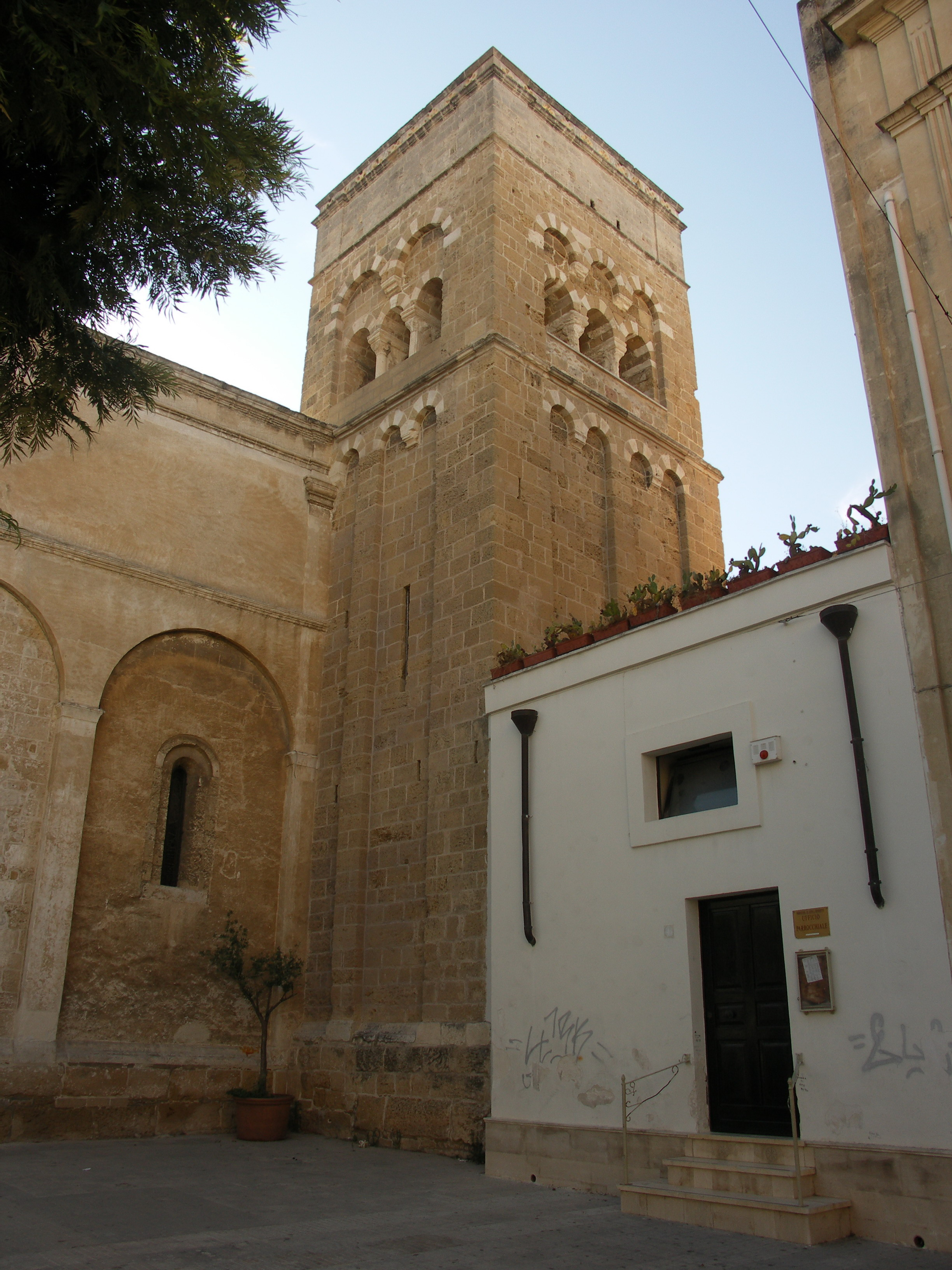
Bell tower of the church of San Benedetto.

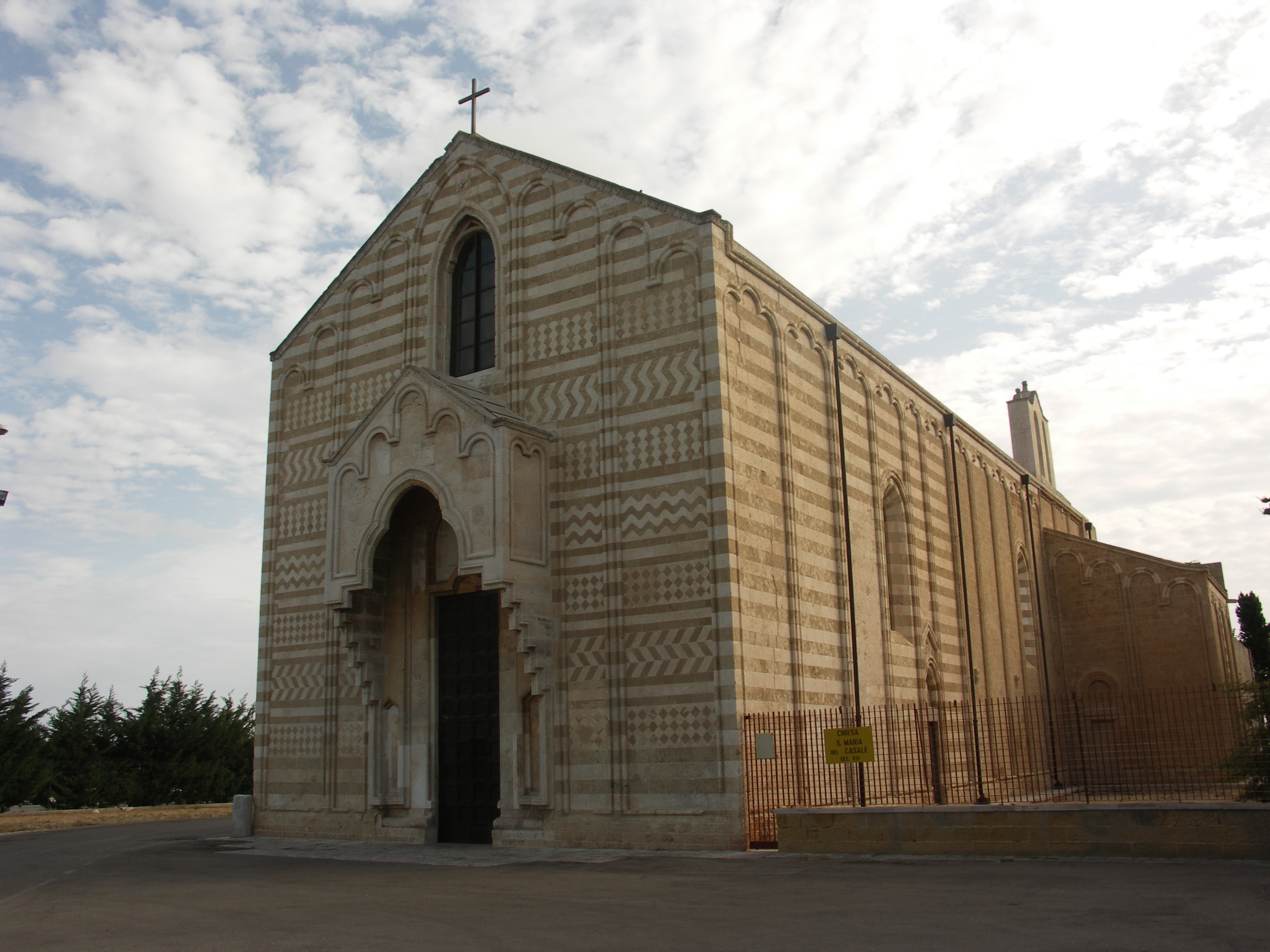
Church of Santa Maria del Casale.

- The Castello Svevo or Castello Grande ("Hohenstaufen Castle" or "Large Castle"), built by Emperor Frederick II. It has a trapezoid plan with massive square towers. Under the Crown of Aragon four towers were added to the original 13th-century structure. After centuries of being abandoned, in 1813 Joachim Murat turned it into a prison; after 1909 it was used by the Italian Navy. During World War II it was briefly the residence of King Victor Emmanuel III.
- The Aragonese Castle, best known as Forte a Mare ("Sea Fort"). It was built by King Ferdinand I of Naples in 1491 on the S. Andrea island facing the port. It is divided into two sections: the "Red Castle" (from the color of its bricks) and the more recent Fort.
- Two ancient Roman pillars, symbols of Brindisi. They were once thought to mark the ending points of the Appian Way, instead they were used as a port reference for the antique mariners. Only one of the two, standing at 18.74 metres (61.5 ft), is still visible. The other crumbled in 1582, and the ruins were given to Lecce to hold the statue of Saint Oronzo (Lecce's patron), because Saint Oronzo was reputed to have cured the plague in Brindisi.
- the Duomo (cathedral), built in Romanesque style in the 11th–12th centuries. What is visible today is the 18th-century reconstruction, after the original was destroyed by an earthquake on 20 February 1743. Parts of the original mosaic pavement can be seen in the interior.
- Church of Santa Maria del Casale (late 13th century), in Gothic-Romanesque style. The façade has a geometrical pattern of grey and yellow stones, with an entrance cusp-covered portico. The interior has early-14th-century frescoes including, in the counter-façade, a Last Judgement in four sections, by Rinaldo da Taranto. They are in late-Byzantine style.
- Church of San Benedetto, in Romanesque style. Perhaps built before the 11th century as part of a Benedictine nunnery, it has a massive bell tower with triple-mullioned windows and Lombard bands. A side portal is decorated with 11th-century motifs, while the interior has a nave covered by cross vaults, while the aisles, separated by columns with Romanesque capitals, have half-barrel vaults. The cloister (11th century) has decorated capitals.
- Portico of the Templars (13th century). Despite the name, it was in reality the loggia of the bishop's palace. It is now the entrance to the Museo Ribezzo.
- the Fontana Grande (Grand Fountain), built by the Romans on the Appian Way. It was restored in 1192 by Tancred of Lecce.
- Piazza della Vittoria (Victory Square). It has a 17th-century fountain.
- Church of Santa Maria degli Angeli (1609).
- Church of the Sacred Heart.
- Church of San Giovanni al Sepolcro, with circular plan, dating from the 12th century.
- Church of the Santissima Trinità (or Santa Lucia, 14th century). It has a late 12th-century crypt.
- the Monument to Italian Sailors

=== Natural areas ===
Within the territory of the town of Brindisi environmental protected areas are located, some newly established:

- The Regional Natural Park of Punta della Contessa Salt: wetland of 87 hectares (214 acres) between Capo di Torre Cavallo and Punta della Contessa
- The Regional Nature Reserve Forest Cerano: a protected natural area that falls within the territory of Brindisi and San Pietro Vernotico;
- The Regional Nature Reserve Bosco of Santa Teresa and Lucci: it is a protected natural area composed of two forests whose name it bears. With the EU Directive 92/43 EEC, was included in the list of Sites of Community Importance (SCI);
- The Marine Nature Reserve Guaceto Tower: falling mostly in the municipality of Carovigno, are managed by a consortium which includes the municipalities of Brindisi, Carovigno and the WWF.

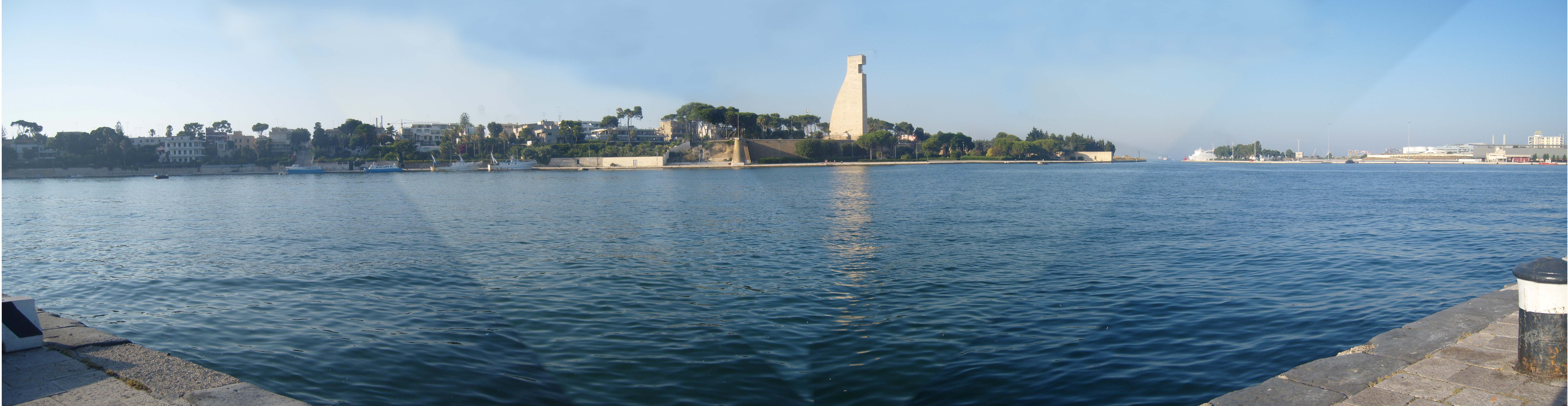
Brindisi Harbour

== Demographics ==
Historical population
Year	Pop.	±%
1861	9,137	—
1871	13,552	+48.3%
1881	16,618	+22.6%
1901	23,106	+39.0%
1911	25,692	+11.2%
1921	35,440	+37.9%
1931	39,885	+12.5%
1936	41,699	+4.5%
1951	58,313	+39.8%
1961	70,657	+21.2%
1971	81,893	+15.9%
1981	89,786	+9.6%
1991	95,383	+6.2%
2001	89,081	−6.6%
2011	88,812	−0.3%
2021	83,317	−6.2%
Source: ISTAT

The largest non-Italian ethnic community is Albanian. The number of those who decided to stay in the city, however, is negligible in light of the number of immigrants who migrated. Brindisi remains the first step towards western Europe for displaced people from the Balkans.

The large number of Americans is largely due to a U.S. Air Force station, between Brindisi and San Vito dei Normanni that operated throughout the second half of the 20th century. Although the base is no longer operational, many soldiers have decided to stay.

The British presence is the result of a recent phenomenon of families from Northern Europe, especially English and Irish, settling in the region. Many such settlers are pensioners, buying villas in the Brindisi countryside. This phenomenon is relatively recent in Apulia, known as "Salentoshire", a playful neologism along the lines of "Chiantishire" on the consolidation of British tourism in Tuscany.

=== Migration ===
Brindisi has been the subject of extensive emigration during the 20th century, as well as all cities in the South. Emigration focused mainly on the lower strata of society who abandoned the countryside. Emigration can be traced in two great waves. The first, which was at its peak in the years immediately before and after the First World War, was almost exclusively to the Americas (and mostly to the United States, Argentina, and Brazil). The second wave of migrants from Apulia headed instead for Northern Europe after the Second World War. Attracted by the industrial development of some northern areas of the country, many Apulian migrants also settled in the Piedmont and Lombardy regions of northern Italy, and particularly in Milan. Since the 1960s, when the large petrochemical companies were joined by mechanical, naval, and aviation corporations, Brindisi was able to create employment opportunities for technicians and workers. The city experienced a small regional immigration, attracting families from neighboring provinces and regions.

Another important chapter in the demography of the town was the exodus of people from Albania in 1990–1991, which lasted almost a decade and led to the port of Brindisi receiving waves of Albanian immigrants.

=== Languages and dialects ===
The Brindisi dialect is a variant of Salentino and, although there are minor differences between the various municipalities, the root remains unchanged. It is spoken not only in Brindisi, but in some towns of the province of Taranto. The Brindisi also affects some dialects north of Lecce in the south

=== Religion ===
Brindisi, along with Ostuni, is home of the Archdiocese of Brindisi-Ostuni (Archidioecesis Brundusina-Ostunensis in Latin), home of the Catholic Church suffragan of Archdiocese of Lecce and part of the ecclesiastical region of Apulia. The diocese was erected in the 4th century, its first bishop was St. Leucio of Alexandria. In the 9th century following the destruction of the city by the Saracens, the bishops established their residence in Oria. The bishop Theodosius was successful in recovering the relics of St Leucio at the end of the 9th and keeping them in a basilica he built on top of the martyrium of the saint. It was in the 10th century that established the Diocese of Ostuni, first joined the Diocese of Conversano-Monopoli and likely heir to the ancient diocese of Egnatia.

On 30 September 1986, by decree of the Congregation for Bishops, the Archdiocese of Brindisi and Ostuni diocese were united in the Archdiocese of Brindisi-Ostuni plena. The new diocese was recognized civilly 20 October 1986, by decree of the Ministry of Interior. Brindisi contains an Eastern Orthodox Church parish, St. Nicholas of Myra Byzantine Rite. The rite of the Greek presence in Brindisi has long been established since the rule of the Byzantine Empire with a strong spread of the Basilian monks. The Jews were a small but industrious community from 53 AD until the second half of the 16th century. The new Albanian migration has led to the recurrence of some Islamic religious presence.

== Culture ==
=== Traditions and folklore ===
Significant in Brindisi is the cult of Tarantismo that combines pagan and Christian tradition. In the past it was believed that women who showed forms of hysteria were infected by the bite of a Lycosa tarantula. The only known remedy was to dance continuously for days, so that the poison did not cause greater effect. Through music and dance was created a real exorcism in musical character. Each time a tarantato exhibited symptoms associated with Taranto, the tambourine, fiddle, mandolin, guitar and accordion players went in the house of the tarantato and began to play the pinch music with frenetic rhythms. The Brindisi pinch, as opposed to Lecce, is devoid of Christian references and a therapeutic repertoire and musical detail.

=== Education ===
==== Libraries ====
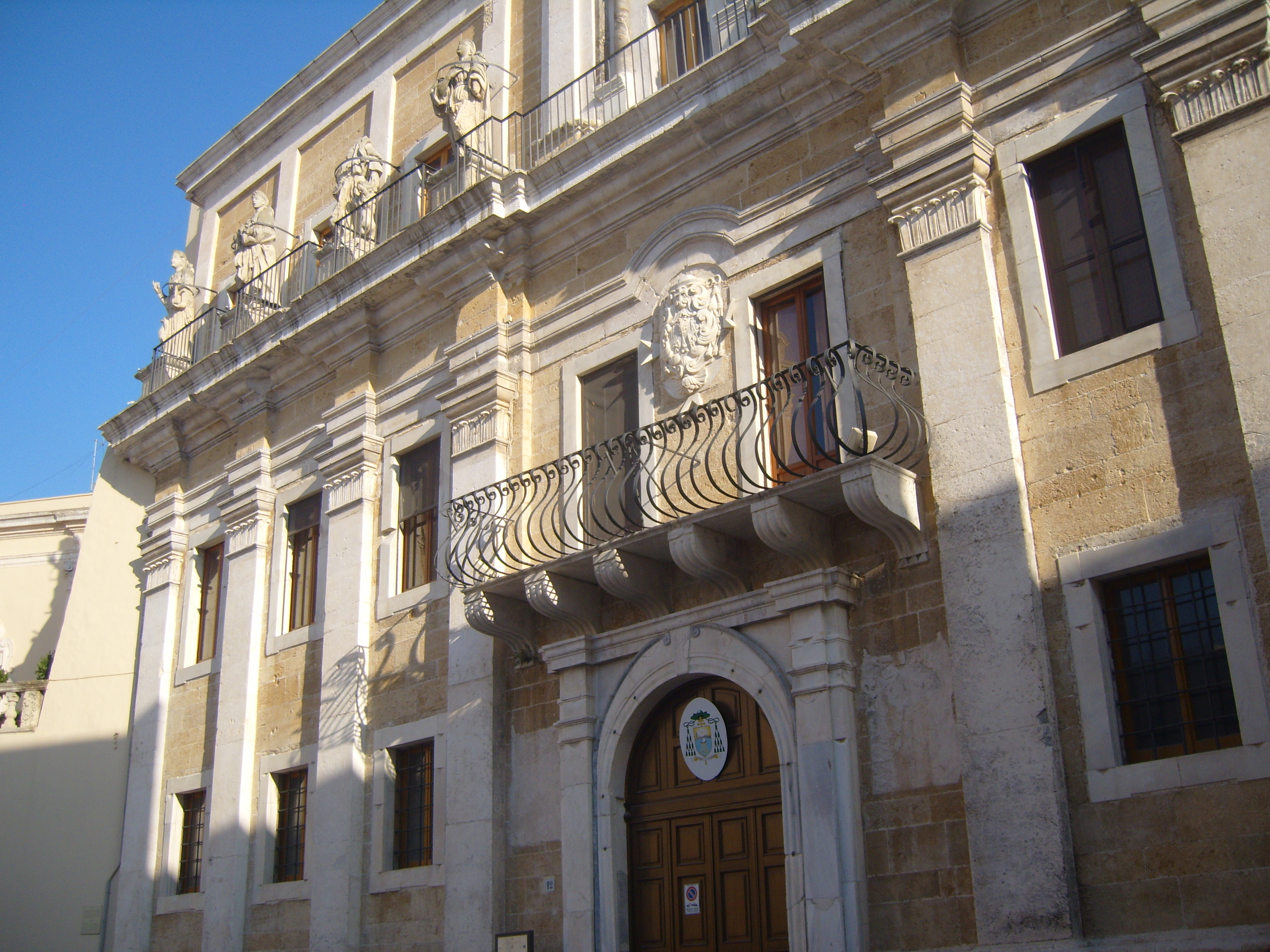
Seminary of Brindisi Library

The Provincial Library is a public library located in Commenda avenue. It has over 100,000 books and an extensive newspaper archive and participates in the National Library Service. Inside a modern auditorium, a media office and the secretariats of the university offices of Bari and Lecce operate. The Archbishop Annibale De Leo Library is a prestigious public library housed in the Seminary of Brindisi, in Piazza Duomo. Founded in 1798 by archbishop of Brindisi Annibale De Leo, with an endowment of about 6,000 volumes, today it has over 20,000 volumes, 17 incunable, over 200 16th-century manuscripts. These include some rare works, and various manuscript collections.

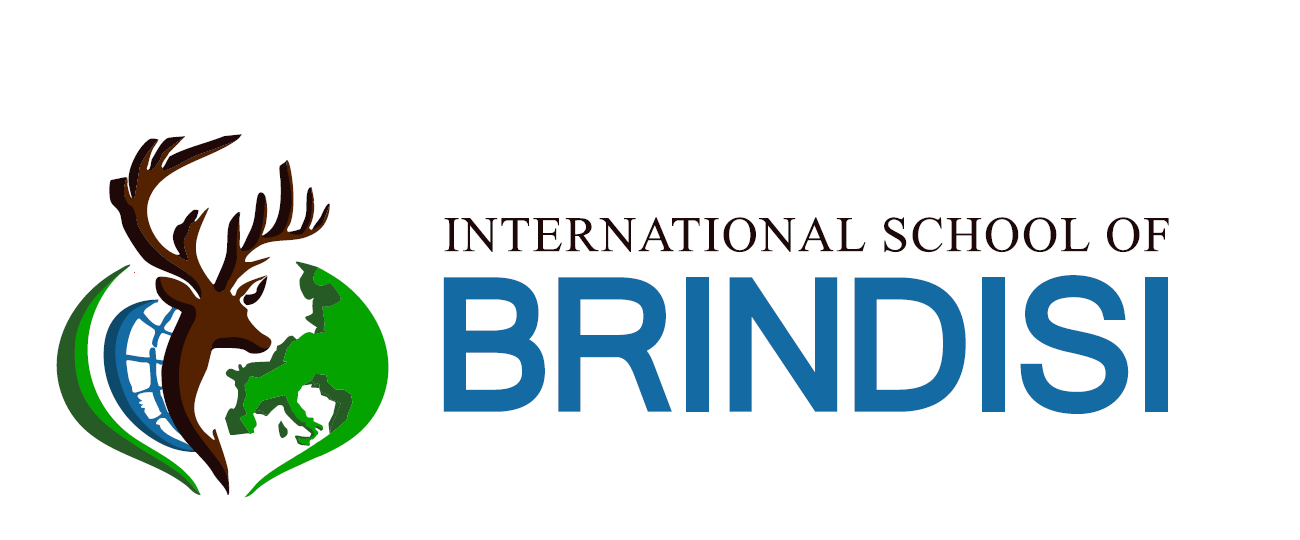
International School of Brindisi

Schools

Brindisi has an American accredited school, the school is The International School of Brindisi (ISB) and is accredited by the American accrediting agency Cognia. The school has students from pre-K through high school. The school is also a non-profit community supported school. AP and college classes are available for the high school students. The current director is Dr. Corey Magyar.

==== University ====
The University of Salento Brindisi has social sciences, politics and geography faculty with courses in Sociology, Social Services and Political Science. The University of Bari has courses in Business Administration, Management and Consulting, Economics, Maritime and Logistics, Information Technology, Design, Nursing and Physiotherapy.

==== Museums ====
The "F. Ribezzo" Provincial Archaeological Museum is located in Piazza Duomo and has many large rooms, providing visitors with six sections: epigraphy, sculpture, the antiquarium, prehistoric, coins, medieval, modern and bronzes of Punta del Serrone. The Giovanni Tarantini Diocesan Museum is newly established and is housed in the Palazzo del Seminario. It has a collection of paintings, statues, ornaments and vestments from the churches of the diocese. Particularly important is the silver embossed Ark that has the remains of St Theodore of Amasea and a 7th-century pitcher, in which one can recognize the wedding at Cana. The Ethnic Salento Agrilandia Museum of Civilization offers tourists the chance to see many statues in wood and stone. It also features agriculture and interesting tools with the rural culture.

=== Music and theatre ===
Over the past decade the city has developed and consolidated non-amateur theater companies, some dealing with theater for research and actor training. These companies have developed several socio-cultural projects for the promotion of the theater for people with disabilities. The same group of companies has produced six shows.

The municipal theatre is the Teatro Verdi (New Verdi Theatre). It is located in the historical center of the city, and opened in 2006. In 2022, Stefano Miceli was appointed chairman of the theatre foundation. Under his guidance, the theater debuted its resident orchestra named Orchestra del Nuovo Teatro Verdi and its first symphonic concert season. During the same year the tenor Fabio Armiliato sang at the official inauguration of the first Verdi Gala at Nuovo Teatro Verdi, and new jazz and classical music festivals and international guests artists debuted at the theatre.

== Brindisini ==
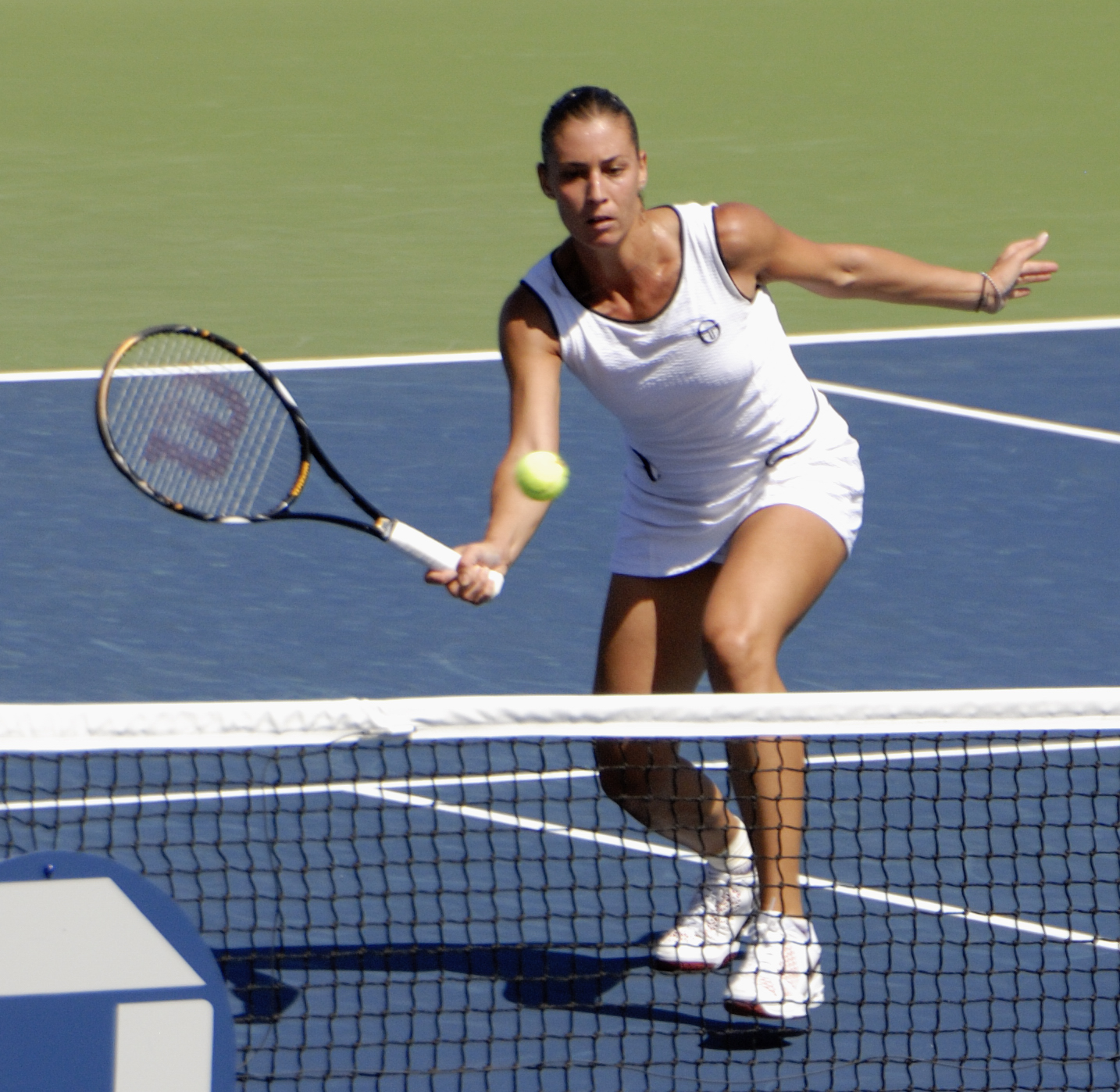
Flavia Pennetta

- Marcus Pacuvius (Brundisium, 04.29.220 b.C. – Tarentum, 02.07 130 b.C.) Roman artist, poet and dramatist, nephew of Quintus Ennius.
- Margaritus of Brindisi (also Margarito; Italian Margaritone or Greek Megareites or Margaritoni [Μαργαριτώνη]: c. 1149–1197), called the new Neptune, was the last great ammiratus ammiratorum (Grand Admiral) of Sicily. First Count of Malta, Prince of Taranto and Duke of Durazzo.
- St. Lawrence of Brindisi: (born Giulio Cesare Russo, Brindisi, 22 July 1559 – Santa Maria de Belém (Lisbon), 22 July 1619) was a priest of the Italian Order of Friars Minor Capuchin. Proclaimed a saint by Pope Leo XIII in 1881, in 1959 was ranked among the Doctors of the Church.
- Cesare Braico (Brindisi 1816 – Rome 1887), patriot, doctor and politician
- Cristina Conchiglia (Brindisi 1923 – Lecce 2013), trade unionist and politician
- Giustino Durano (Brindisi 1923 – Bologna 2002), actor
- Benita Sciarra (Brindisi 1926 – Mesagne 1993), archaeologist
- Oscar Nuccio (Brindisi 1931–2004), historian of economics
- Eugenio Barba (Brindisi, 1936), director
- Franco Testini (Brindisi, 7 October 1966) also known as Venerable Shi Yanfan is the first Western Buddhist monk ever to be ordained at the Songshan Shaolin Temple of China. He is currently the appointed Cultural Ambassador for the Songshan Shaolin Temple.
- Antonio Benarrivo (Brindisi, 21 August 1968) is a former soccer player who held the role of defender, starter for italy in the 1994 World Cup final
- Eupremio Carruezzo (Brindisi, 9 December 1969), retired footballer.
- Stefano Miceli (Brindisi, 14 April 1975) pianist and conductor
- Flavia Pennetta (Brindisi, 25 February 1982) is a tennis player, reached 6th place in world rankings after winning the 2015 US Open.
- Cosimo Aldo Cannone (Brindisi, 20 March 1984) is a driver of Powerboating, 2 time world champion, in 2007 and 2008.
- Antimo Iunco (Brindisi, 10 June 1984) was a former football player and had the role of attacker.
- Daniele Vantaggiato (Brindisi, 10 October 1984) is a soccer player for Fasano and has the role of attacker .
- Gianluca Di Giulio (Brindisi, 17 February 1972), former footballer

== Media ==
=== Radio ===
Radio station CiccioRiccioBrindisi is heard throughout Apulia, Basilicata, parts of Molise, Campania, and Calabria. Radio Dara that started in a workshop, founded in 1980, now broadcasts across the province.

=== Print ===
As for the press, the La Gazzetta del Mezzogiorno publishes the Brindisi Journal. Salento's newspaper, the Nuovo Quotidiano di Puglia also covers Brindisi. Senzacolonne, which was founded in 2004, is the only one with a central editorial office in Brindisi. "The Nautilus" national scientific magazine based in Brindisi, reports on the sea, ports, transport and recreational boating. Other newspapers that have their headquarters in the city are BrindisiSera and "Brindisi News".

=== Television ===
Brindisi is home to the television stations Teleradio Agricoltura Informazione and Puglia TV, which began broadcasts in January 1988 in Brindisi.

== Cuisine ==
Brindisi's cuisine is simple with basic ingredients used, starting with flour or unrefined barley, which is less expensive than wheat. Vegetables, snails, and bluefish figure prominently in its cuisine. Among the recipes are "Pettole" (fried yeast dough, sweet or savory to taste stuffed maybe with cod or anchovy, with cauliflower or broccoli), "Patani tajedda rice and mussels" (rice, potatoes and mussels), soup, fish, mashed potatoes with fava beans, broad beans and mussels, and "Racana mussels".

=== Beverages, spirits, liquors ===
Almond milk: made by infusing water with the finely chopped almonds and then squeezing the same to expel the "milk". The region of Apulia has entered the milk of almonds in its list of traditional Italian food products. Limoncello: a liquor made from the peel of fresh lemons and enriched with water, sugar and alcohol.

=== Cheese ===
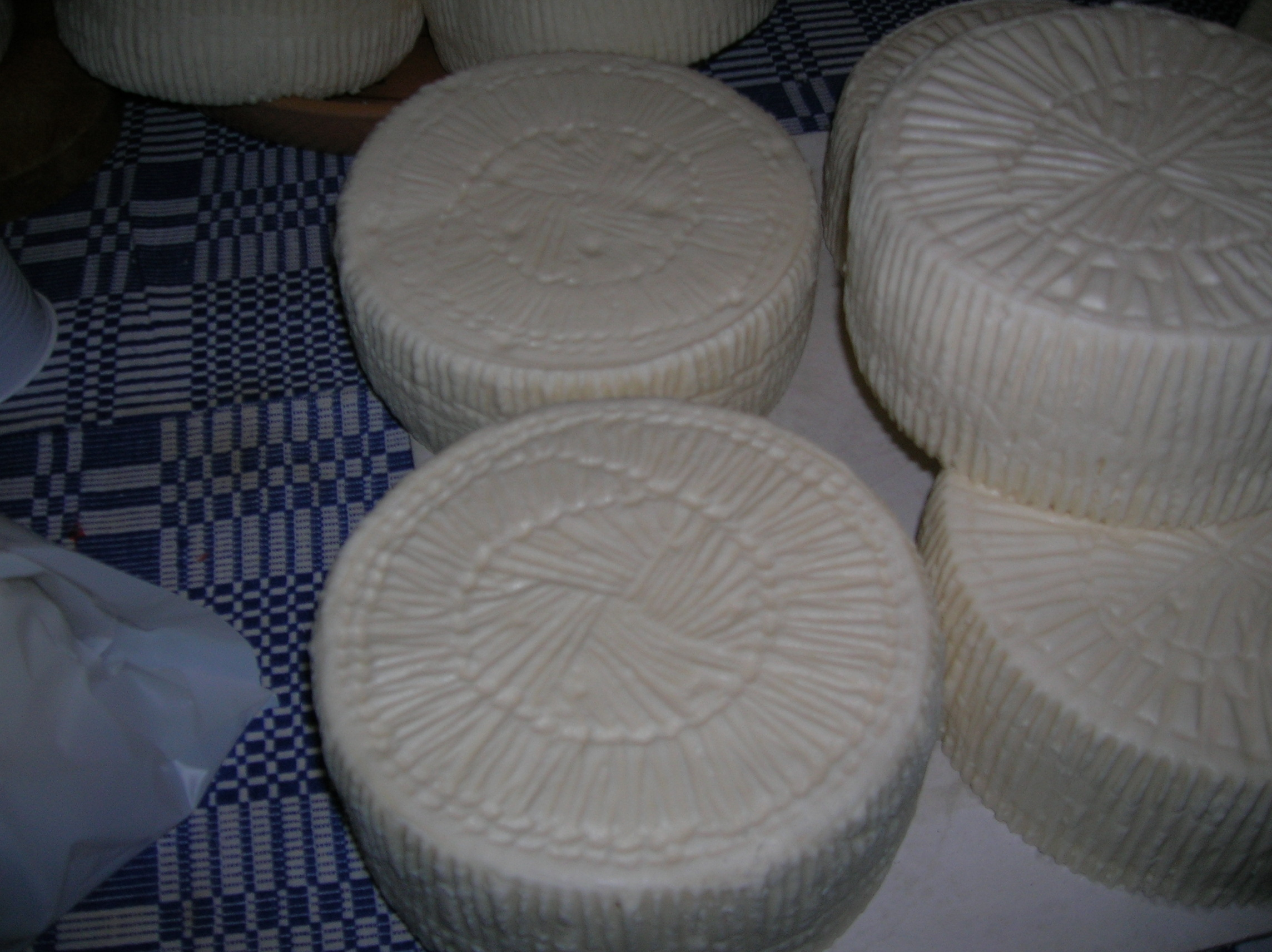
Cacioricotta cheese

Brindisi cheeses are mostly from sheep, due to the significant ranching of sheep and goats. In the summer they produce ricotta, which can be eaten fresh or matured for a few months so that it has a stronger flavor.

Typical of the winter season are the Pecorino, ricotta and strong ricotta (or cottage cheese). It is used to flavor spaghetti sauce or spread on bruschetta. Fresh popular cheeses are burrata, junket, Manteca cheese, mozzarella or Fior di latte.

=== Vegetable products, processed or unprocessed ===
Vegetables are the true protagonist of the traditional diet of Salento. Depending on season, are the tops of turnips, various types of cabbage, the beet greens from the thistle, peppers, eggplant and zucchini (all served sun-dried or in olive oil), and artichokes. There are also wild vegetables used in traditional cooking such as chicory, dandelion (or zangune), wild asparagus, the Wild mustard, the thistle, the lampascioni also called pampasciuni or pampasciuli, and capers.

Frequent, in the Brindisi kitchen, is the use of green or white tomatoes: mainly used for tomato sauce but they are also consumed in olive oil, after a process of natural drying. Significant is also the consumption of green and black olives, crushed or in brine. Finally, legumes such as beans, peas and Vicia faba, eaten fresh or dried in the spring and during the winter season.

Among the dishes prepared with fruit are quince, baked figs and dried figs (prepared with a filling of almonds), jam with orange and lemon, and fig jam.

=== Pasta, pastry and confectionery ===
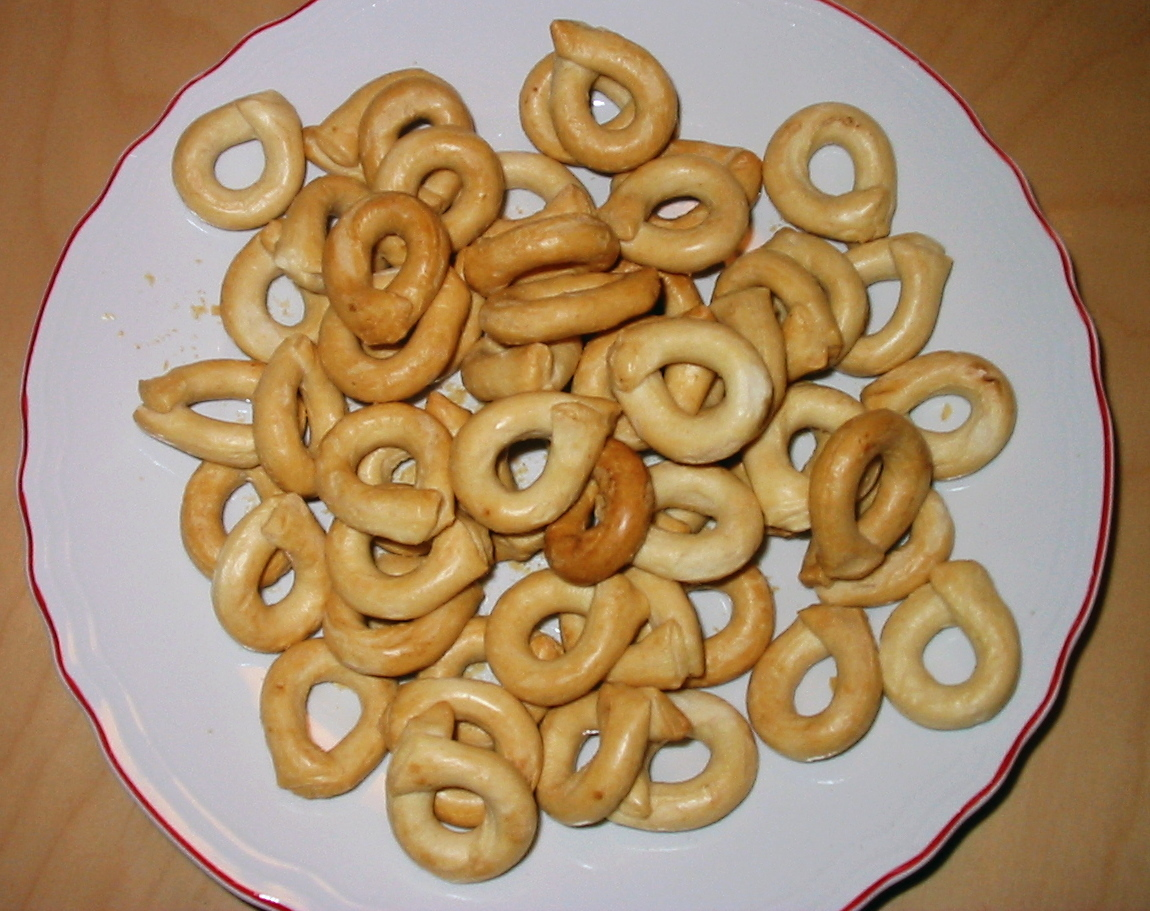
Taralli

Pasta and bread is made with unrefined flour, and thus takes on a dark colour. Durum wheat is mixed with traditional meal. Special local dishes include lasagna with vegetables, cavatelli, orecchiette (stacchioddi in Brindisi dialect) and ravioli stuffed with ricotta.

In breadmaking, local custom favours the use of durum wheat, bread flour and barley bread. For bread made with yeast (called criscituni) and cooked on an oven stone, Brindisi bakers use bundles of olive branches to give the bread a particular scent. One type of traditional bread is made with olives (called puccia). It is made with a much more refined wheat flour than for ordinary bread, to which are added black olives. A traditional focaccia from Brindisi is "puddica", made with simple ingredients—flour, water, yeast, olive oil—and topped with tomatoes, capers, and oregano.

Also important are frisella, a sort of dehydrated hard bread which can be stored for a long time, and tarallini, also easily stored for long periods. The pucce and uliate cakes are also typical. Among local desserts the central place is occupied by almond paste, obtained by grinding shelled almonds and sugar. Another specialty is cartellate, a pastry, particularly prepared around Christmas, made of a thin strip of a dough made of flour, olive oil, and white wine that is wrapped upon itself, intentionally leaving cavities and openings, to form a sort of "rose" shape; the dough is then deep-fried, dried, and soaked in either lukewarm vincotto or honey.

=== Wine ===
In the area of Brindisi are produced Aleatico di Puglia Doc, Ostuni Doc, Brindisi Rosso DOC, Rosato Brindisi DOC and Puglia IGT. Some grape varieties grown in Brindisi include:

- Malvasia Nera di Brindisi;
- Negroamaro;
- Ottavianello;
- Sangiovese;
- Susumaniello.

The Brindisi DOC produces both red and rose wines from grapes limited to a harvest yield of 15 tonnes/ha and must produce a wine with a minimum 12% alcohol level. The wines are usually blends made predominantly from Negaroamaro and Malvasia Nera but Sangiovese is allowed to compose up to 10% of the blend with Montepulciano allowed to compose up to another 20% (or 30% if Sangiovese is not included). If it is to be a Reserva, the wine is aged a minimum of 2 years before release and must attain a minimum alcohol level of 12.5%.

=== Events ===
- The day of Corpus Christi.
- The Procession to the beach of San Lorenzo and San Teodoro, on the first Saturday of September.
- The Feast of San Teodoro: Feast with candles, food stands, music, fireworks, in the first week of September.

== Human geography ==
=== Roman period ===
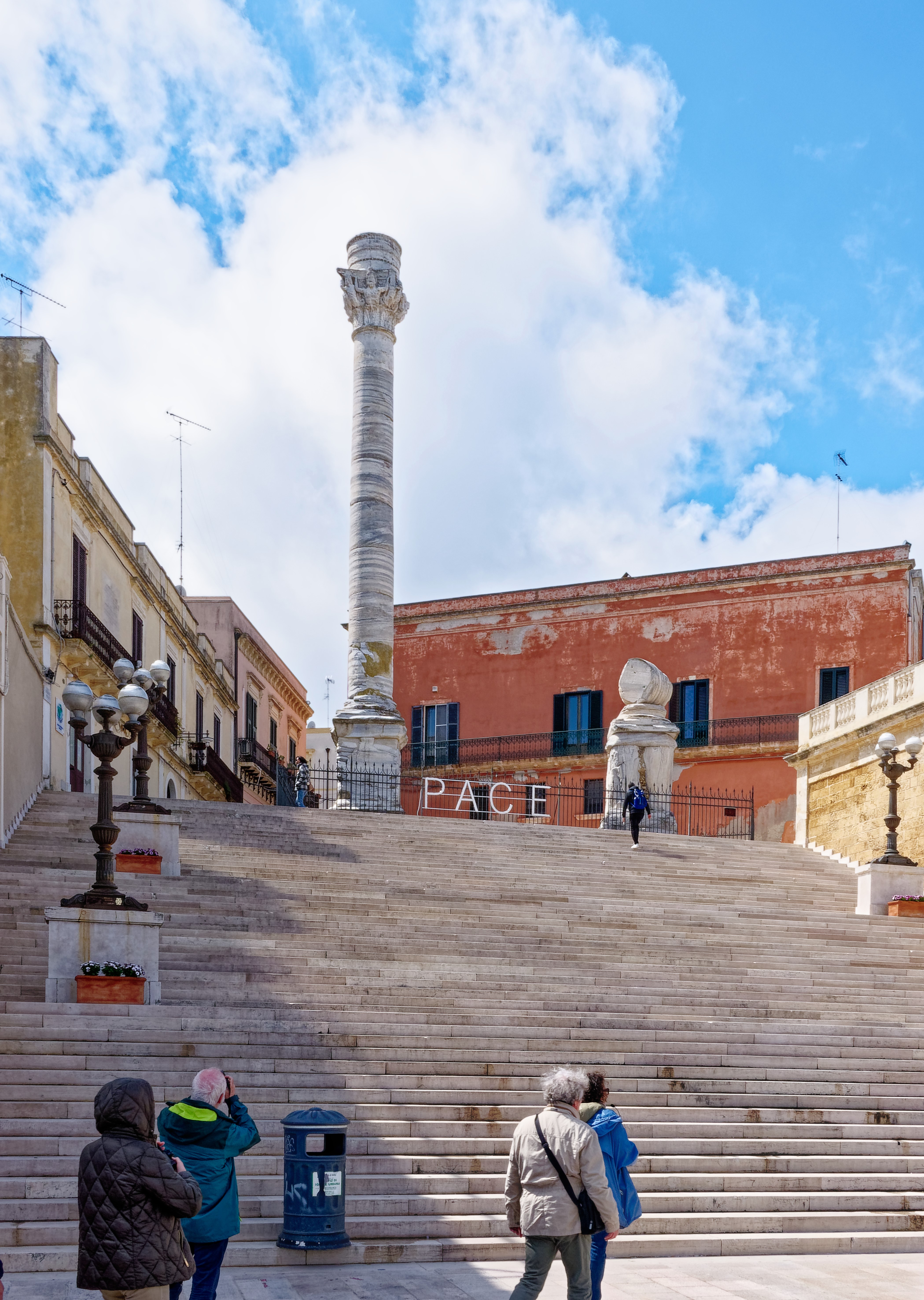
Roman pillar signaling the end of the Appian Way

From an urban point of view [58] [59], the city's earliest signs of human settlement are on the promontory of Punta Terre, a coastal area outside the port. As a Roman colony (244 BC), the city experienced a major urban expansion that ensued economic and social development. According to Pliny the Elder, Brindisi was one of the most important Italian cities.

=== Middle Ages ===
During the Middle Ages, Brindisi suffered a sharp decline, after it was devastated by the Goths in the 6th century; Procopius describes it as a small city without defensive walls. The town shrank to a smaller area, probably around the San Leucio temple, outside the old town. The port was abandoned for several centuries. The rebirth came with the Byzantine domination (11th century) and especially with the Normans and the Swabians (12th and 13th century), when it became a prime port for the Crusades. The city was divided into three districts or "pittachi": Santo Stefano (in the vicinity of the columns), Eufemia (in Santa Teresa) and San Toma (in the area of Saint Lucia). Under the Aragonese and the Spanish kings, the main efforts were directed mainly around the ramparts (walls, castle and sea fort to provide relief from mostly the Greeks, Albanians and Slavs.

=== Modern era ===
Only through the reopening of the Pigott channel (1775), the city experienced a new impetus and reopened traffic with the East mainly due to the establishment of the Suez Canal at the end of the 19th century.

=== Contemporary era ===
Demographic development in the 20th century led to the modern city overlying the ancient one, at the cost of the demolition of the neighbourhoods around San Pietro degli Schiavoni, Teatro Verdi, and the Clock Tower. Today urban planning demands that settlements of significant architectural impact are built outside the city centre. The city has now expanded beyond the walls of the historic centre to form the new suburbs of Commando, Capuchins, Sant'Angelo (1950–1970) and St. Clare, St. Elias, and Bozzano (1980–2000).

== Economy ==
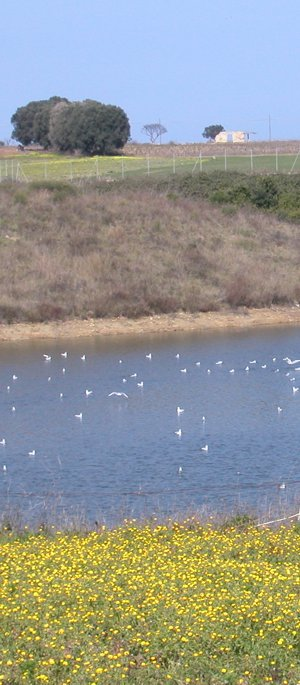
Agriculture is still prominent in Brindisi

The development of industry led to radical changes in the Brindisi economy and consequent development along the coast. Taking advantage of the location of the port, Brindisi is also a major seaport for Greece and Turkey.

=== Agriculture ===
Brindisi agriculture includes horticulture, viticulture, fruit and olives. The area that marked the territory for centuries is based on the culture of almonds, olives, tobacco, artichokes, and grain. Livestock consists of cattle, goats and sheep.

=== Industry ===
Industry in Brindisi is mainly identified with the chemical and aerospace industry.

==== Chemical ====
The chemical industry, in its various forms (food processing, energy, and pharmaceutical) is highly developed in the territory of Brindisi. The Federchimica association recognizes Brindisi as an industrial chemical center.

The various establishments of Eni, located as Polimeri Europa, Snam and EniPower are placed in the petrochemical complex of Brindisi, on the outskirts of the city, overlooking the Adriatic Sea.

==== Energy production ====
Brindisi is a leader in the production of electricity in Italy. ENEL Federico II is a power plant on 4 sections divided by polycombustible thermoelectric power of 660 MW each, came into service between 1991 and 1993. Edipower Brindisi, located in Costa Morena, in the industrial area of Brindisi. Central EniPower Brindisi is a combined cycle power plant EniPower, once completed, with an installed capacity of 1,170 megawatts, will be the most powerful among those of the Eni Company. Regasification terminal at Brindisi, the construction of a regasification terminal by the company's "Brindisi LNG SpA. will heat the area of Porto Exterior, called Capobianco. The authorization process is currently in the process of completion of the national Environmental Impact Assessment, initiated by the company in January 2008. Photovoltaic system, the largest in Europe photovoltaic park (with power of 11 MWp), which should start operating in 2010, at the former petrochemical site. The industry group responsible for the construction will be joined by the University of Apulia.

==== Aviation ====
The Alenia Aeronautica plants (specialized in the modification of aircraft from passenger configuration to cargo) are located in Brindisi. Avio (center for military engines) and Agusta (production of helicopter metal structures) are also located there.

=== Tourism ===
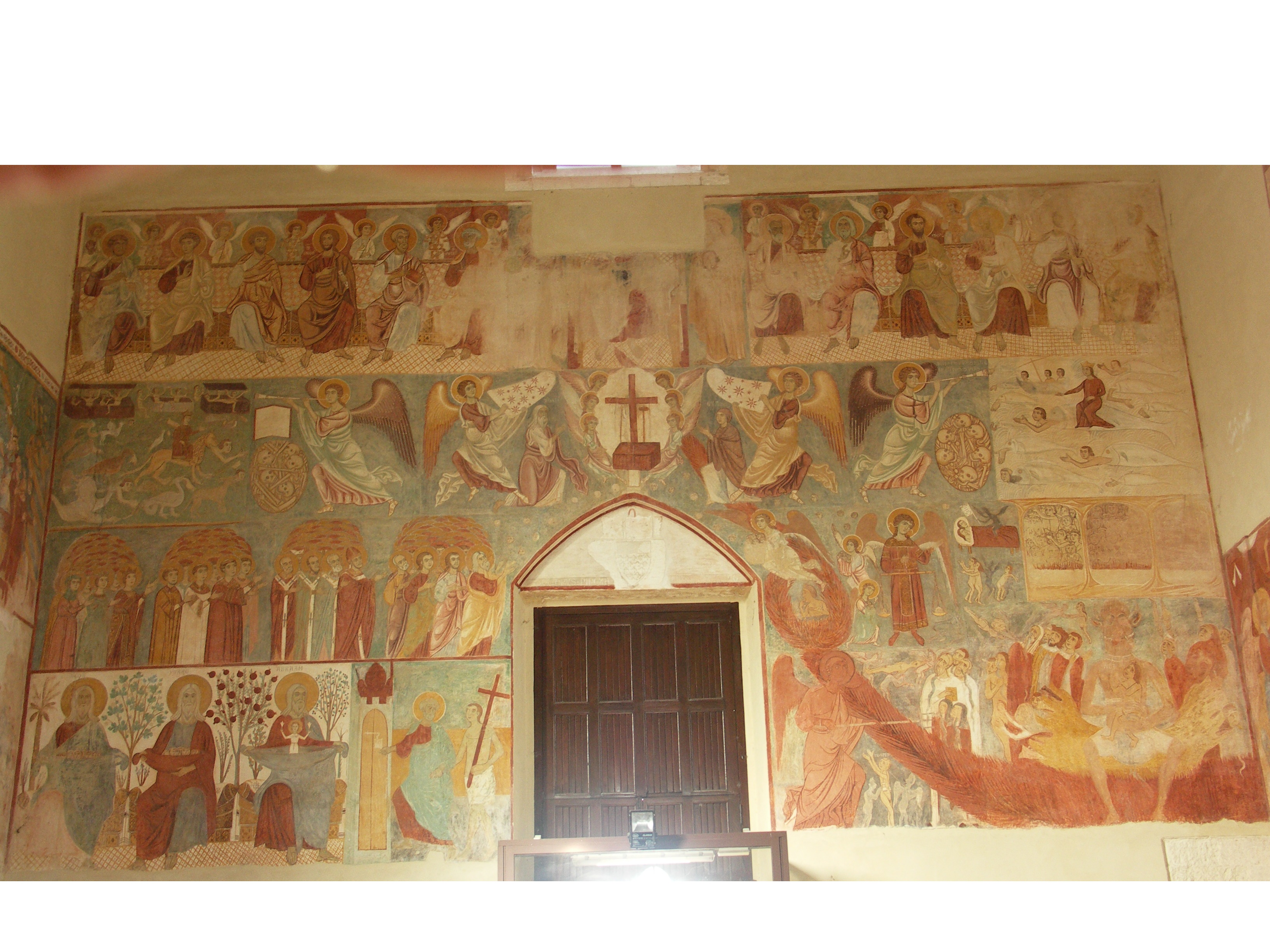
Byzantine fresco in Santa Maria del Casale

The city preserves important archaeological finds and coastline, particularly the north coast, where there are many large sand dunes and beaches. Inland agritourism, displays wine (Wine Appia) or olive oil (Collina di Brindisi oil). Brindisi Tourism, however, remains heavily dependent on the Italian tourists (74%, compared with 26% of foreign demand) and is very seasonal.

== Infrastructure and transport ==
=== Roads ===
The main roads are represented by

- Bari-Lecce expressway, connecting with Brindisi, Lecce, with Bari and the A14.
- Adriatica SS 16 is the Brindisi bypass connecting the city to San Vito dei Normanni and Lecce * Brindisi-Taranto Brindisi with Taranto.

=== Railways ===
Rail transport is provided through Brindisi railway station, an important Apulian railway junction and an intersecting point between the Adriatic Railway and the Taranto–Brindisi railway. The station is managed by Centostazioni, and links Brindisi with all destinations served by the Adriatic and Ionian coastal railways. Brindisi Marittima railway station closed in 2006.

=== Seaport ===
The port of Brindisi has always been at the center of trade with Greece. It is one of the most important commercial and industrial seaports on the Adriatic Sea. The trade is mostly in coal, fuel oil, natural gas, and chemicals.

The port consists of three parts:

- The Outer Harbour: the limits of which are in the southern mainland, east of the Pedagne islands and west of the island from the pier in Costa
- The port is formed by the average area of sea that is before the Pigott Channel, access to the inner harbor, the basin to the north as the Strait of Apulia.
- The inner harbor is formed by two long wings that touch the heart of Brindisi both the north and east, they are the "bosom of the west" and "within the east."

=== International airport ===
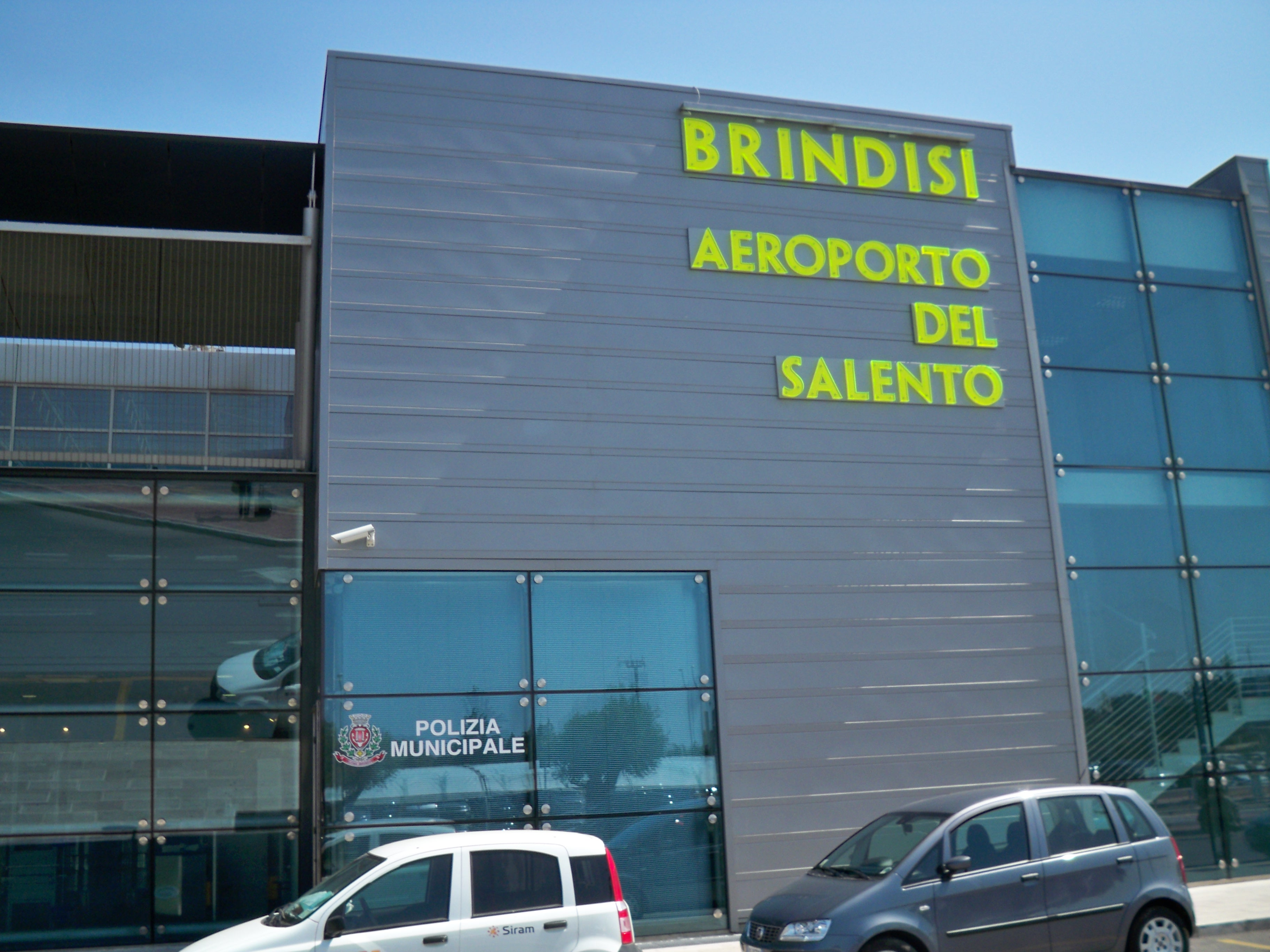
Brindisi Airport

Brindisi is home to Papola-Casale Airport located 6 kilometres (4 miles) outside the city's center. The airport of Brindisi has daily connections with major Italian and European cities. The airport serves the entire province of Brindisi and partly that of Taranto. In 2017, a total of 2,321,147 passengers passed through.

It has two runways, one northwest to southeast that is 3,330 metres (10,930 ft) long, and the other northeast to southwest that is 1,950 metres (6,400 ft) long. Their characteristics allow the landing of large transport aircraft such as the Antonov An-124 and Boeing 747.

This airport was originally established as a military airbase in the 1920s. As of 2008 it has officially changed its legal status into civilian airport, still maintaining the military facilities attached to it. These are identified as "Military Airport Orazio Pierozzi", named in memory of an Italian airman of the First World War.

The strategic position of the airport in the Mediterranean region, along with its natural potential for multi-modal (the port is a few kilometers away) operations, have made it a base of crucial importance for both national defense and NATO. For the same strategic reasons, in 1994 the airport was chosen as the main worldwide logistics base by the United Nations to support its peacekeeping and peace enforcement operations around the globe, which was since then hosted in Pisa Military Airport "San Giusto". In 2000, also the United Nations humanitarian supply depot moved from Pisa to Brindisi. It has since then been managed by the World Food Programme and officially known as the United Nations Humanitarian Response Depot (UNHRD). On behalf of governments, other UN agencies and NGOs, from UNHRD Brindisi humanitarian aid is directed to the most remote and devastated regions around the world.

=== Public transport ===
The Public Transport Company of Brindisi provides public transport in the city, and is the link with the other municipalities in the province. Moreover, the company provides transport service by sea into inland waters of the port of Brindisi. Brindisi is also a major ferry port, with routes to Greece and elsewhere.

== Government ==
=== Consulates ===
Brindisi is home to the following consulates:

- Denmark
- France
- Honorary Consulate of Greece
- Netherlands

== Sports ==
=== Association football ===
Brindisi 1912 has played in six championship series. Their football strip colours recall those of the province, white and blue. The club plays in the stadium named after the president of the historical association on the Adriatic shore, Commander Franco Fanuzzi Stadium. ASD Appia Brindisi plays in the Regional Championship of the "First Category".

=== Basketball ===
The main basketball team in the city and in the wider region of Apulia is New Basket Brindisi, which has played for basketball championships in the top of A1 championships in League 2. Their colours are the same as that of all sports associations in the city, white and blue. The club plays their home games in the sports hall "Elio Pentassuglia".

=== Other clubs ===
- NAFTA rugby Brindisi (C1)
- Aces Amateur Volleyball 2006 (series B1 female).

=== Sports venues ===
- Franco Fanuzzi Stadium: Municipal Stadium
- PalaPentassuglia: sports hall
- PalaMelfi: sports hall
- Brindisi Tennis Club
- St. Elias Sports Centre: rugby, sports hall, tennis court

== International relations ==
=== Twin towns – sister cities ===
Brindisi is twinned with:

- Lushnjë, Albania
- Patras, Greece
- Corfu, Greece
- Amasya, Turkey
- Charlotte, United States of America
