= Jieba =

Ritual scars on Buddhist monks

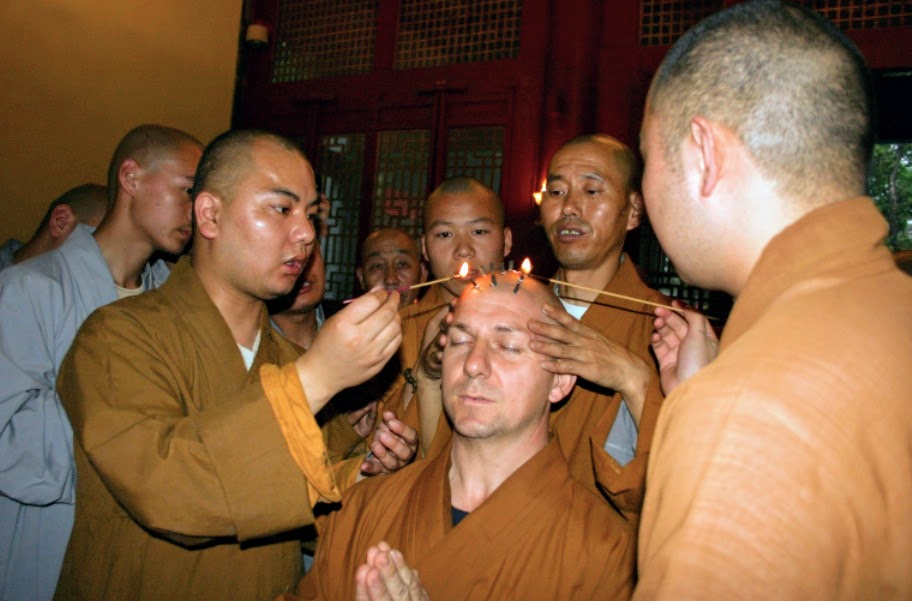
- Shi Yan Fan receiving the jieba
- Chinese: 戒疤
- Literal meaning: precept scars
Transcriptions
Standard Mandarin
- Hanyu Pinyin: jièbā
- Wade–Giles: chieh^{4}-pa^{1}
- IPA: [tɕjê.pá]
Yue: Cantonese
- Jyutping: gaai^{3}-baa^{1}

Jieba (Chinese: 戒疤) is an ordination practice where ritual burn scars are received by Buddhist monks of traditions within Chinese Buddhism such as Pure Land and Chan Buddhism, including some specific temples such as that of Shaolin monks. This practice is part of the ceremony for receiving the bodhisattva vows as fully ordained monastics.

== Procedure ==
One method of creating the marks is achieved by placing an incense-like stick of Artemisia vulgaris called a moxa onto the top of the head and burning the moxa for several minutes, causing moxibustion burns on the scalp, a process that creates the scars. Moxa is used over regular incense to lessen the pain that is caused by the scarring process. The practice is potentially dangerous, and can result in temporary injury including infection, blood poisoning, impaired eyesight, and swelling, as well as potentially permanent injuries including blindness.

== Religious significance ==
The number of jieba scars that a monk will receive ranges from three to twelve, though historically as many as eighteen have been used. The meaning of the jieba varies, with some definitions being refuge in the three jewels, or alternatively symbolizing the three Buddhist characteristics of discipline, concentration, and wisdom, especially when these marks are made in multiples of three.

The justification for the jieba ceremony is often taken from sutras, including the sixteenth precept of the Fanwang jing which discusses Bodhisattva renunciation practices that include "the burning of one's body" as being an ultimate act in the quest for enlightenment, and that if one is not prepared to follow these practices then they cannot become a monk.

Laypeople will sometimes receive jieba on their forearms after taking the Bodhisattva Precepts as a sign of sacrifice and dedication during a Buddhist initiation ritual.

== History ==
The practice dates back to at least the Chinese Yuan dynasty (1271–1368), and the earliest known recorded description of jieba comes from around the year 1280 in a biography of a monk named Zhide (1235–1322) in a document called Ming gaoseng zhuan (Biographies of Eminent Monks compiled under the Ming).

One origin that has been suggested is that the practice began as a means of identifying monks after the issuance of ordination certificates was suspended by the Yongzheng Emperor during the mid 18th century, after which the practice was ubiquitous for Chan Buddhist monks during the remainder of the 18th century.

The practice itself may be an apocryphal concept to Chan Buddhism, as there is evidence that the existence of moxibustion in China predates both Buddhist usage and the authorship of the Brahmajāla Sūtra (also called the Fànwǎng jīng in Chinese) or the Śūraṅgama Sūtra (also called the Shouleng'yan jing in Chinese), both themselves apocryphal texts which in part discuss and justify such practices as moxibustion and jieba.

In December 1983, the Buddhist Association of China, the official Chinese government body that oversees Buddhism in China, decreed that jieba was "a ritual practice which was not of Buddhist origin, and since it was damaging to the health was to be abolished forthwith."

This ritual is still practiced in Taiwan in the triple platform ordinations. The offering of incense on the body occurs the night before receiving the bodhisattva vows. It is not mandatory but three is a common choice among monastics. In Vietnam it is called Lễ Tấn Hương and is also more common than the Chinese variant.

== Similar practices ==
Ceremonial branding is an integral part of religious initiation in most Vaishnava sects. References to this practice can be traced in texts such as Narad Panchratra, Vaikhnasagama, Skanda Purana, etc. This practice is still in vogue among Madhava sect Brahmins of Karnataka in India.

== Popular culture ==
The character Krillin from the Dragon Ball media franchise is a monk that has six jieba on his forehead. In Jet Li's first film, the 1982 Chinese film The Shaolin Temple, his character Jue Yuan has jieba on his head. Many movies that portray monks with jieba scars during the Tang and Song dynasties are considered anachronistic, as there is no evidence of the practice in use prior to the Yuan dynasty.
