= Shi Yan Fan =

Shaolin warrior monk

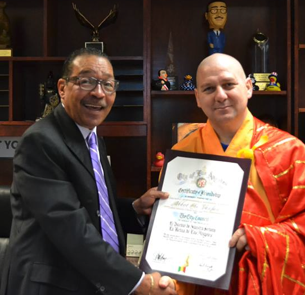
LA City Council President Herb J. Wesson presents Venerable Shi Yanfan with recognition

Franco Testini, known professionally as the Venerable Shi Yan Fan, is a 34th-generation ordained Shaolin Warrior Monk and cultural ambassador of the Songshan Shaolin Temple in China. He is a disciple of Shi Yongxin, 30th Abbot of the Shaolin Temple in Dengfeng City, Henan Province, and is the head abbot of the Los Angeles Shaolin Temple in Sherman Oaks, California, United States.

== Biography ==
Born in Brindisi, Italy, Testini began studying martial arts aged seven. Coming from a poor family of 10, he challenged other children in the neighborhood to martial arts contests to win money to support his family. Aged nine, he was then introduced to a master named Kim Wong Feng, who accepted Testini as his student.

By the age of 19, Testini had won several national fighting and forms competitions in Italy, and also won first place against 700 competitors for strongest arms at the Golden Dragon competition in Amsterdam. At the age of 21, he entered the Chi Ri temple in South Korea to take vows of becoming a monk.

In 1994, Testini moved to the United States to promote Shaolin and Buddhism. Upon his arrival in the United States, he was homeless and unable to speak English, and exchanged martial arts instruction for food, while gradually gathering students.

In 2004, Testini was inducted into the Shaolin Temple at Song Shan Mountain in Henan Province, China. He became a disciple of the Abbot Shi Yongxin, adopted the name Shi Yan Fan ("Powerful Sky"), and was given permission to open a Shaolin Temple in Los Angeles, which opened in 2008 in a former furniture store in Sherman Oaks.

In 2007, an ordination ceremony was held at the Shaolin Temple. Shi Yan Fan was the first of a total of 43 Shaolin monks to receive the jieba markings in that ceremony, becoming the first Westerner to be ordained as a Shaolin monk.

In 2012, Shi Yan Fan founded a nonprofit organization, the Yanfan Foundation, providing health and wellness training.
