= Cesare Braico =

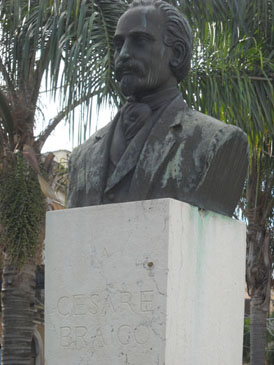

Cesare Braico (24 October 1816, in Brindisi – 25 July 1887, in Rome) was an Italian patriot, doctor and politician who took part in the Enterprise of the Thousand (Garibaldi's army). He was later appointed Deputy of Brindisi.

== Biography ==
Braico graduated in medicine at the University of Naples and was also an active member of the 1848 Revolution. He joined the up and took part in the Battle of Solferino, as a soldier and doctor.

In 1860 he took part in The Expedition of the Thousand for which he was awarded a medal in recognition of his heroic services by Nino Bixio. After the Unity of Italy, he was elected Deputy in the first Italian Parliament. He took part in the III war of independence. Within the general context of his political activity he was Chairman of the Board of Health. When he retired he was suddenly taken ill and died in a Roman hospital . His native town was Brindisi, the town has dedicated a street and a park in his name in remembrance of this extraordinary citizen.

== Novels ==
- Ricordi di galera, (Memories of prison) with an introduction and notes by Alberto Del Sordo, a Neapolitan Count;

== Bibliography ==
- M. Themelly, «BRAICO, Cesare». In: Dizionario Biografico degli Italiani Vol. XIII, Rome: Italian Encyclopedia's Institute (on-line);
- Luciano Sterpellone, references on «Cesare Braico» as patriot and doctor during the Expedition of the Thousand. In: «Camici bianchi in camicia rossa - Medici e medicina nel Risorgimento».

== See also ==
- Cesare Braico Italian page
- Garibaldi
- Expedition of the Thousand
