= San Mango sul Calore =

- Comune
- Comune di San Mango sul Calore
- Location within Italy Location within Campania
- Coordinates: 40°58′N 14°58′E
- Country: Italy
- Region: Campania
- Province: Avellino (AV)
- Frazioni: Malvito, Poppano, Carpignano, Verzari, Cesine

Government
  - Mayor: Teodoro Boccuzzi

Area
  - Total: 14.59 km^{2} (5.63 sq mi)
- Elevation: 470 m (1,540 ft)

Population (31 December 2017)
  - Total: 1,169
  - Density: 80.12/km^{2} (207.5/sq mi)
- Demonym: Sammanghesi
- Time zone: UTC+1 (CET)
  - Summer (DST): UTC+2 (CEST)
- Postal code: 83050
- Dialing code: 0827
- Website: Official website

San Mango sul Calore is a village and comune in the province of Avellino, in the Campania region of southern Italy.

== Geography ==
It is east of Naples and north of Salerno, about twenty kilometers from the city of Avellino. Nearby, Monte Tuoro is covered with dense forest, where asparagus and a variety of mushrooms such as porcini, black truffles, ovuli and chiodini abound.

The comune is bordered by Castelvetere sul Calore, Chiusano di San Domenico, Lapio, Luogosano, Paternopoli and Taurasi.

== History ==
Ponte Romano ("Roman Bridge"), also known locally as Ponte del Diavolo or Ponte di Annibale, is the oldest man-made structure in San Mango, built in about 100 BC. The bridge is composed of bricks, mortar and cobblestone taken from the Calore river that flows beneath it. It was part of the old Napoletana road that passed by the Sant'Anna chapel, curving down to the Calore River. The road eventually met with the Appian Way, the ancient Roman road that ran from Rome to Brindisi.

Ellis Island records indicate that the United States received immigrants from San Mango as early as in 1896 many of them settled in Stamford, Connecticut.

The first migrants to arrive at Pier 21 in Halifax, Nova Scotia was during 1950-1951: Emilio Palermo, Achille Cella, Teodoro Maria, Giovanni Palermo, Arcangelo Prizio, Giovanni Taddeo, Mario Taddio, Vittorio Nazzaro, Luigi Catino, Giuseppe Pierni, Tommaso Vito Gerardo Uva who eventually settled in Montreal, Quebec.

San Mango sul Calore was completely destroyed by the 1980 Irpinia earthquake. The re-construction was led by the creation of a set of houses known as Villagio Canadese or Canadian Village. It was named after the fund-raising efforts from Italo-Canadians who established an SOS campaign led by the Canadian Red Cross and the National Congress of Italian-Canadians. The S.O.S. Italia Campaign was led by Me. Antonio Sciascia, Antonio De Palma, Giovanni Molina and Nick Pierni. The project helped with the construction of 36 homes in San Mango.
