= Santo Stefano del Sole =

- Comune
- Comune di Santo Stefano del Sole
- Location within Italy Location within Campania
- Coordinates: 40°54′N 14°52′E
- Country: Italy
- Region: Campania
- Province: Avellino (AV)
- Frazioni: Boschi, Toppolo, Macchie, Sozze di Sopra, Sozze di Sotto, San Pietro

Government
  - Mayor: Francesco Urciuoli

Area
  - Total: 10.78 km^{2} (4.16 sq mi)
- Elevation: 547 m (1,795 ft)

Population (31 December 2017)
  - Total: 2,169
  - Density: 201.2/km^{2} (521.1/sq mi)
- Demonym: Santostefanesi
- Time zone: UTC+1 (CET)
  - Summer (DST): UTC+2 (CEST)
- Postal code: 83050
- Dialing code: 0825
- Website: Official website

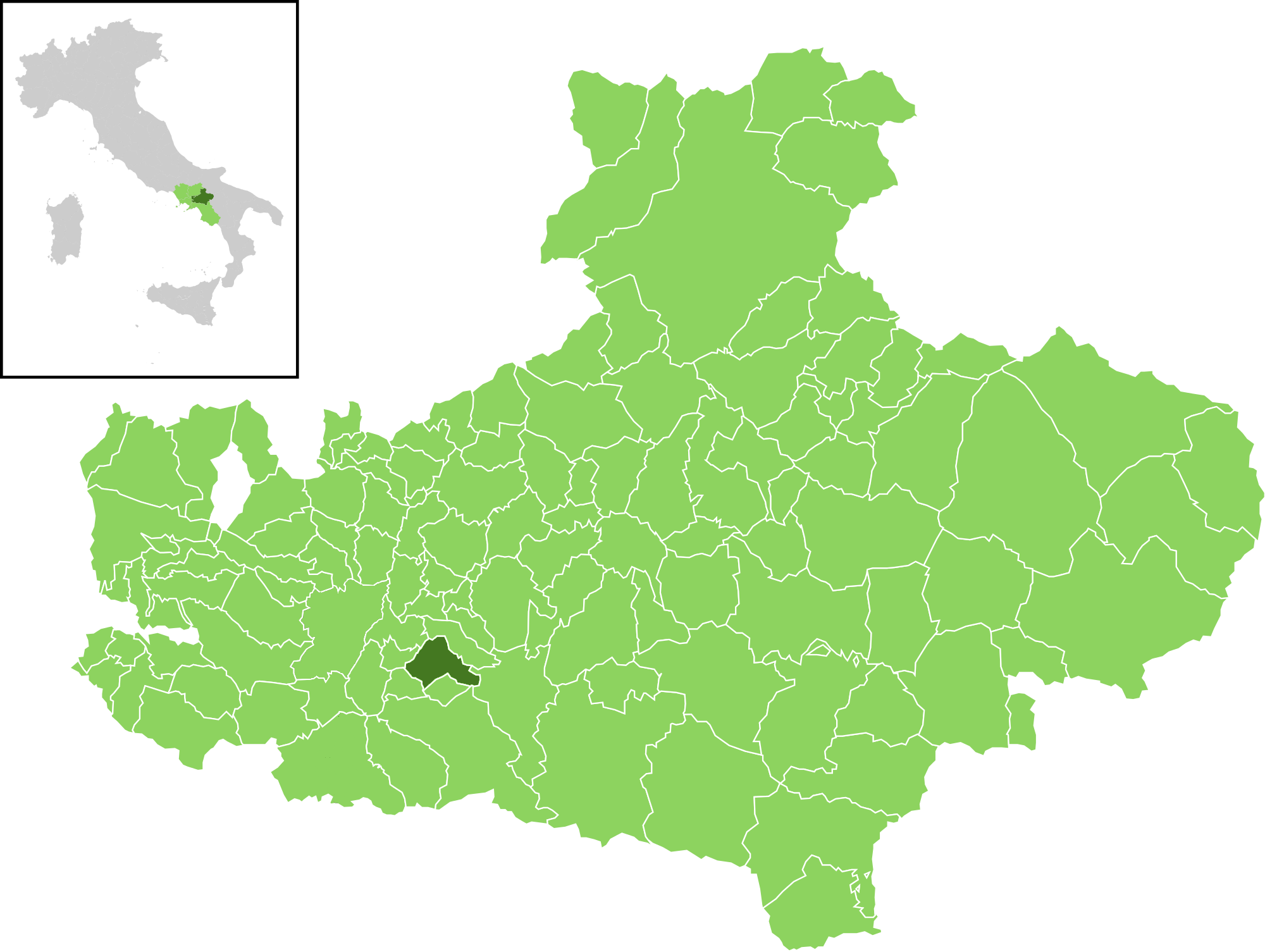
It’s a map of Santo Stefano

Santo Stefano del Sole is a town and comune in the province of Avellino, in the Campania region of southern Italy.

The town is bordered by Atripalda, Cesinali, San Michele di Serino, Santa Lucia di Serino, Serino, Sorbo Serpico and Volturara Irpina.
