= Parolise =

- Comune
- Comune di Parolise
- Location within Italy Location within Campania
- Coordinates: 40°56′N 14°53′E
- Country: Italy
- Region: Campania
- Province: Avellino (AV)
- Frazioni: Serra

Area
  - Total: 3 km^{2} (1.2 sq mi)

Population (2018-01-01)
  - Total: 653
  - Density: 220/km^{2} (560/sq mi)
- Time zone: UTC+1 (CET)
  - Summer (DST): UTC+2 (CEST)
- Postal code: 83050
- Dialing code: 0825
- Patron saint: San Rocco
- Saint day: August 16
- Website: Official website

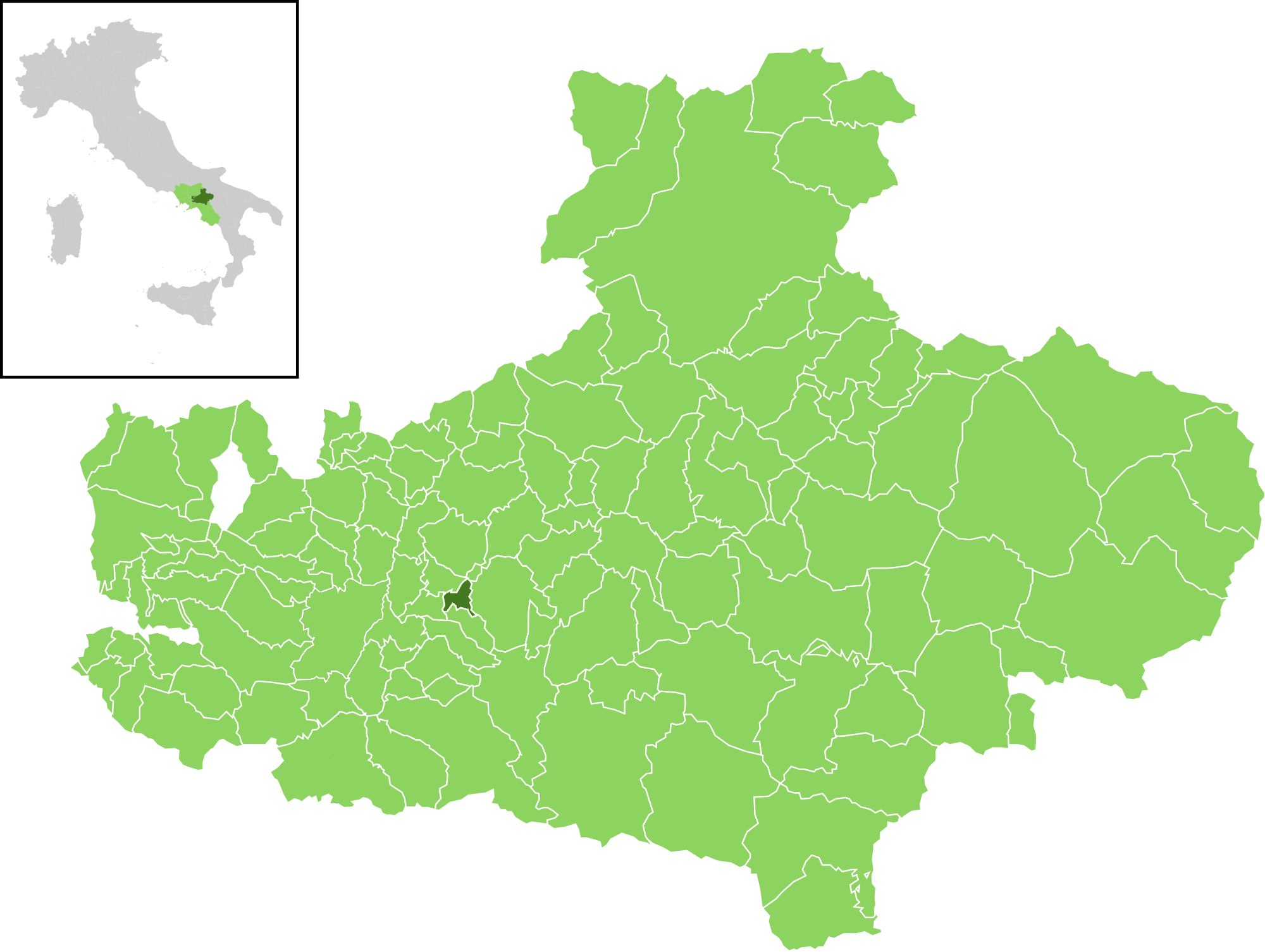
Position of Parolise municipality within the province of Avellino

Parolise (Irpino: Parulìsë) is a village and comune of the province of Avellino in the Campania region of southern Italy.

== Geography ==
Parolise lies in the upper Irpinia area of the Apennine Mountains. The towns of Candida, Chiusano di San Domenico, Lapio, Montefalcione, Salza Irpina and San Potito Ultra are nearby.

== Economy ==
Parolise is known for the Calzaturificio Scorta, that provided shoes for the nobility of Southern Italy, and boots for the Italian Army during World War II.
