= Tufo, Campania =

Tufo
- Comune
- Comune di Tufo
- Location within Italy Location within Campania
- Coordinates: 41°00′N 14°49′E
- Country: Italy
- Region: Campania
- Province: Avellino

Government
  - Mayor: Nunzio Donnarumma

Area
  - Total: 5 km^{2} (1.9 sq mi)

Population (2009)
  - Total: 938
  - Density: 190/km^{2} (490/sq mi)
- Demonym: tufesi
- Time zone: UTC+1 (CET)
  - Summer (DST): UTC+2 (CEST)
- Postal code: 83010
- Dialing code: 0825
- Patron saint: St. Michael
- Saint day: May 8
- Website: Official website

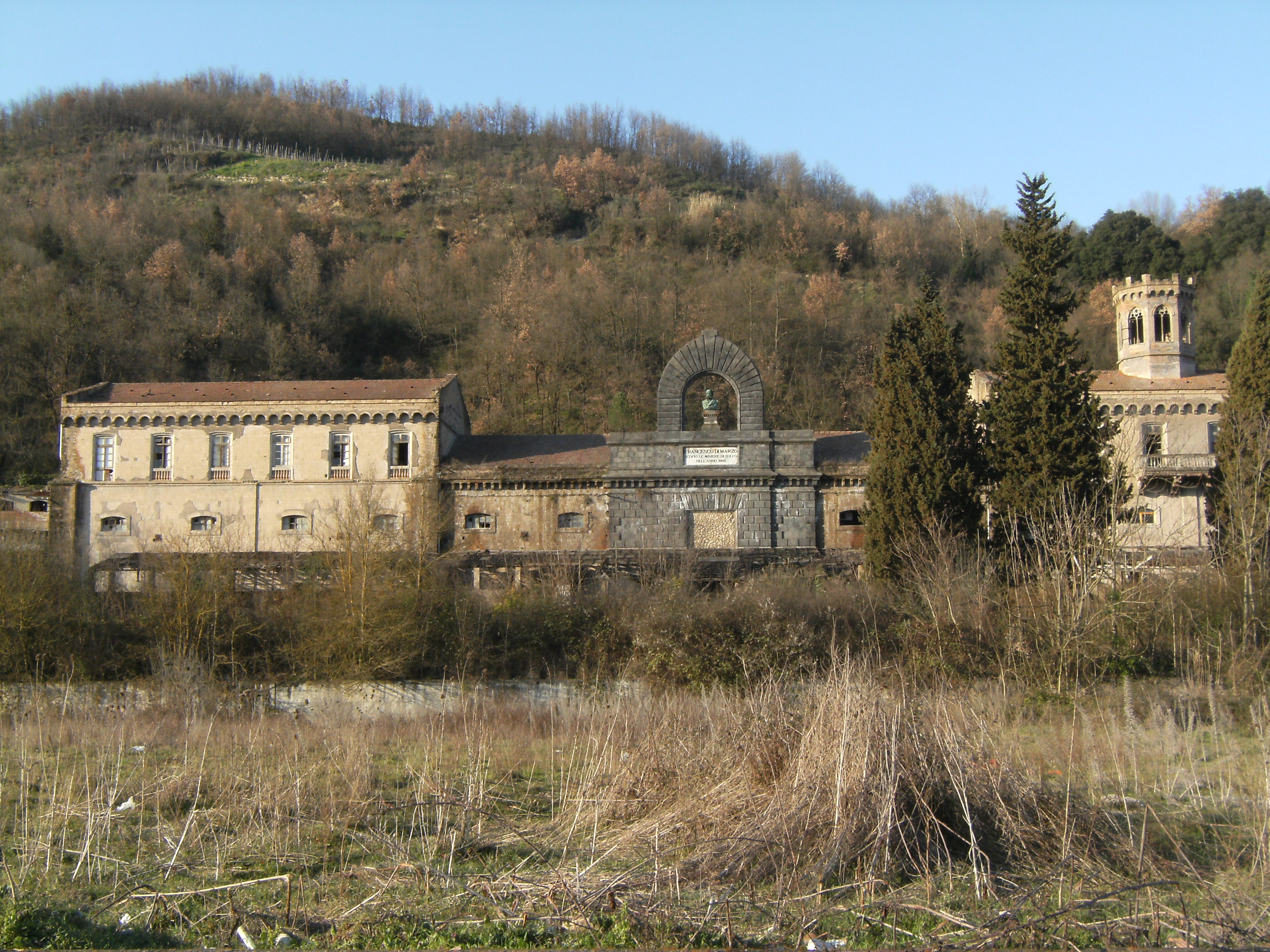

Tufo is a town and comune in the province of Avellino, Campania, southern Italy. As of 2009 its population was 938.

== History ==
The name of the town derives from the tuff, the volcanic rock that is widely present in the subsoil of the whole area of the country.

== Geography ==
Situated in the geographical region of Irpinia, it has an area of approximately 5 square kilometres (2 mi^{2}) and a population density of 190 people per square kilometer. Tufo is bordered by the municipalities Altavilla Irpina, Petruro Irpino, Prata di Principato Ultra, Santa Paolina and Torrioni. The Sabato river flows south of the town.

== Gastronomy ==
The town has given its name to the popular white wine known as "Greco di Tufo" (Greek of Tufo).

== Notable people ==
- Xavier J. Barile (1891–1981), painter
- Dante Troisi (1920–1989), writer

== See also ==
- 1980 Irpinia earthquake
