= Visciano =

- Comune
- Comune di Visciano
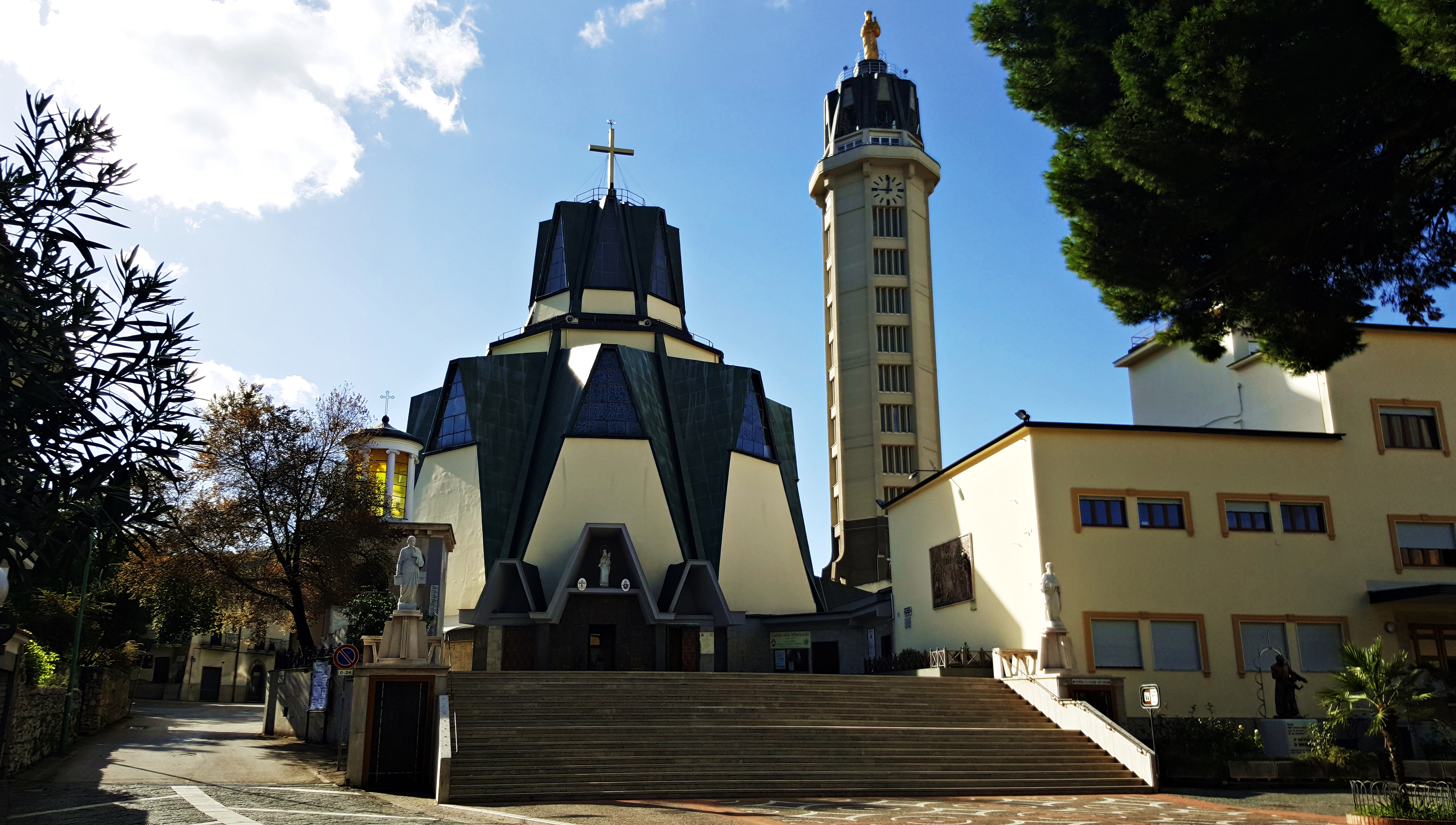

- Location within Italy Location within Campania
- Coordinates: 40°55′N 14°35′E
- Country: Italy
- Region: Campania
- Metropolitan city: Naples (NA)

Government
  - Mayor: Pellegrino Gambardella

Area
  - Total: 10.9 km^{2} (4.2 sq mi)

Population (Dec. 2004)
  - Total: 4,607
  - Density: 423/km^{2} (1,090/sq mi)
- Demonym: Viscianesi
- Time zone: UTC+1 (CET)
  - Summer (DST): UTC+2 (CEST)
- Postal code: 80030
- Dialing code: 081
- Website: Official website

Visciano is a municipality, that is on the edge of the Metropolitan City of Naples, on the border with the province of Avellino in Campania. As of 31 December 2004, it had a population of 4,607 and an area of 10.9 km^{2} (4.2 sq mi).

Visciano borders the following municipalities: Avella (AV), Baiano (AV), Casamarciano, Liveri, Marzano di Nola, Monteforte Irpino (AV), Mugnano del Cardinale (AV), Nola, Pago del Vallo di Lauro (AV), Sperone (AV), Taurano (AV).

== Demographic evolution ==
Historical population

Year	Pop.	±%
1861	1,812	—
1871	1,832	+1.1%
1881	1,860	+1.5%
1901	2,124	+14.2%
1911	2,183	+2.8%

Year	Pop.	±%
1921	2,139	−2.0%
1931	2,433	+13.7%
1936	2,627	+8.0%
1951	3,134	+19.3%
1961	3,434	+9.6%

Year	Pop.	±%
1971	3,877	+12.9%
1981	4,154	+7.1%
1991	4,424	+6.5%
2001	4,621	+4.5%

Source: Data from ISTAT
