= Taurano =

- Comune
- Comune di Taurano
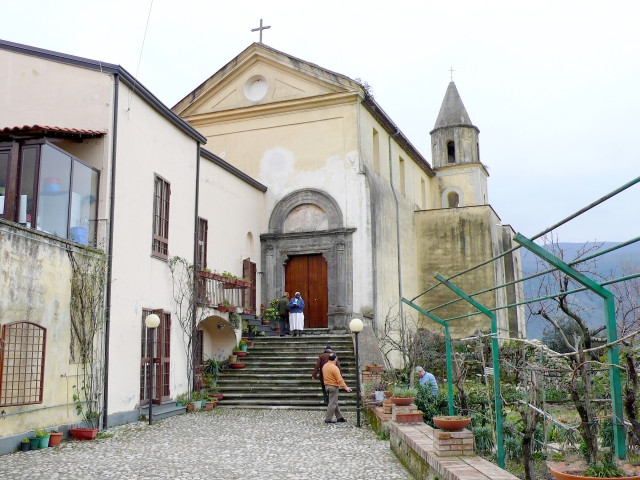
- Sant'Angelo Abbey in Taurano

- Location within Italy Location within Campania
- Coordinates: 40°53′N 14°38′E
- Country: Italy
- Region: Campania
- Province: Avellino (AV)

Area
  - Total: 9 km^{2} (3.5 sq mi)
- Elevation: 300 m (980 ft)

Population (2018-01-01)
  - Total: 1,538
  - Density: 170/km^{2} (440/sq mi)
- Demonym: Tauranesi
- Time zone: UTC+1 (CET)
  - Summer (DST): UTC+2 (CEST)
- Postal code: 83020
- Dialing code: 081
- Saint day: 15 August

Taurano is a village and comune in the province of Avellino, in the Campania region of southern Italy.

== Geography ==
The town lies in the Lauro Valley. It is bordered by Lauro, Monteforte Irpino, Moschiano, Pago del Vallo di Lauro and Visciano .

== History ==
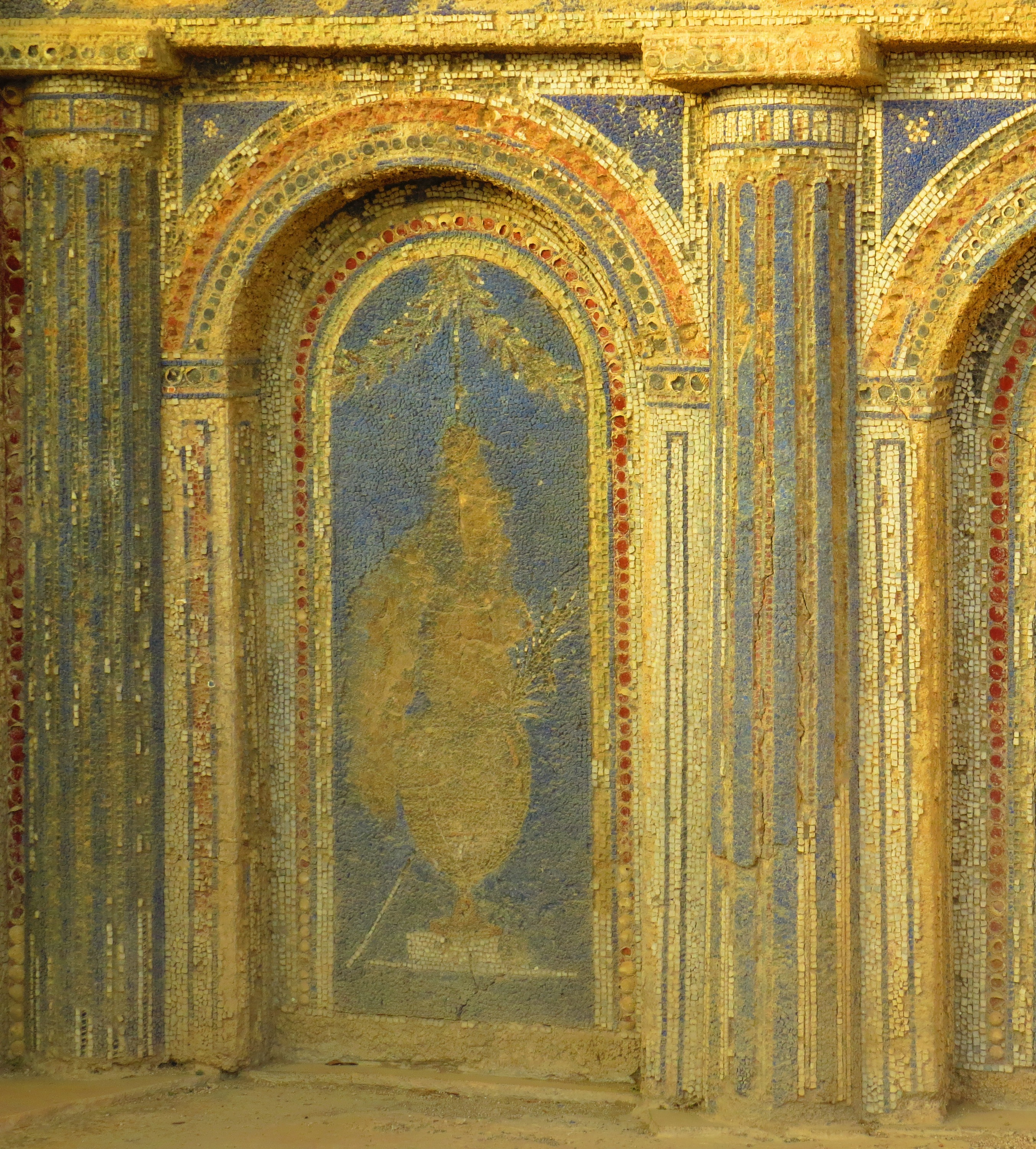
Villa Romana di San Giovanni in Palco

Bronze Age remains have been found in the area of Taurano, whose name derives from Latin, either the surname Taurus or the gentilic Taurius. It was a Samnite oppidum, destroyed by Romans under Sulla during the Social War. It later became a summer resort, and two Roman villas have been found from this period, that (possibly of Vergil) in San Giovanni in Palco and one in Torre.

In the Middle Ages it was part of the Feud of Lauro. Villagers throughout the valley sought refuge in the mountains during the barbarian invasions. Under the administrative reforms of Joachim Murat (King of Naples 1808–15), Taurano and the rest of the Lauro Valley became part of the province of Terra di Lavoro.

In the 19th century Taurano offered shelter to brigands such as Fra Diavolo, and anti-Bourbon conspirators such as Father Angelo Peluso. After unification, Taurano become an autonomous Commune except for a brief interruption.
