= Marzano di Nola =

- Comune
- Comune di Marzano di Nola
- Location within Italy Location within Campania
- Coordinates: 40°54′13″N 14°35′5″E
- Country: Italy
- Region: Campania
- Province: Avellino (AV)
- Frazioni: Domicella, Liveri (NA), Pago del Vallo di Lauro, Visciano (NA)

Government
  - Mayor: Dr. Greco Trifone (Civic List "Torre con stelle")

Area
  - Total: 4.62 km^{2} (1.78 sq mi)
- Elevation: 120 m (390 ft)

Population (1 May 2009)
  - Total: 1,704
  - Density: 369/km^{2} (955/sq mi)
- Demonym: Marzanesi
- Time zone: UTC+1 (CET)
  - Summer (DST): UTC+2 (CEST)
- Postal code: 83020
- Dialing code: 081
- ISTAT code: 064047
- Patron saint: San Trifone
- Saint day: 10 November
- Website: Official website

Marzano di Nola is a town and comune in the province of Avellino, Campania, Italy. This town is located in the Lauro Valley. It borders Liveri, Visciano (Naples province), Pago, Lauro, and Domicella (Avellino province).

== Monuments ==
The main monuments are: the St. Trifone Parish; the "Madonna dell'Abbondanza" sanctuary; the medieval tower; the rural ancient Roman villa; the manor farm "il Fossato".
