= Mugnano del Cardinale =

- Comune
- Comune di Mugnano del Cardinale
- Location within Italy Location within Campania
- Coordinates: 40°56′N 14°38′E
- Country: Italy
- Region: Campania
- Province: Avellino (AV)

Area
  - Total: 12 km^{2} (4.6 sq mi)

Population (2018-01-01)
  - Total: 5,376
  - Density: 450/km^{2} (1,200/sq mi)
- Time zone: UTC+1 (CET)
  - Summer (DST): UTC+2 (CEST)
- Postal code: 83027
- Dialing code: 081
- Website: Official website

Mugnano del Cardinale is a town and comune of the province of Avellino in the Campania region of southern Italy.

== History ==
There are several theories about the origin of the town's name. Today it is believed that the name derives from the divinity of Jupiter Ammon, to whom a temple on the Litto hill was probably dedicated. What is certain is that the town has very ancient origins. The current Mugnano del Cardinale would derive from the fusion of several inhabited nuclei, of different origins and ages. The first documented news of the existence of Mugnano del Cardinale dates back to 1135 (parchment n.219 of the Archive of Montevergine) [4]. In 1805 the remains of Santa Filomena arrived in the village, which made the name of Mugnano del Cardinale famous throughout the world. Between the end of the 19th century and the first decades of the 20th century, Mugnano became an important center of study, with the "A. Manzoni" gymnasium at San Pietro a Cesarano, and with the Maria Cristina di Savoia normal school. As mentioned above, the town became famous thanks to the saint named Filomena. This was a young martyr, whose relics were transported from Rome to Mugnano del Cardinale and it was Ponzetti, guardian of these relics, who affirmed that the girl found there was between thirteen and fourteen years old. It was also communicated that inside there was a vase with Filomena's blood. Various miracles will then be linked to the arrival of Saint Filomena in Mugnano del Cardinale. Santa Filomena is the patroness of youth, assists pregnant women and is a comfort to prisoners. The saint's anniversary is on August 11 in the sanctuary and is celebrated with knockers. The Saint is not celebrated only in Mugnano but also in other countries where she is venerated.

== Geography ==
Baiano, Mercogliano, Monteforte Irpino, Quadrelle, Sirignano, Visciano are nearby towns.

== Sights ==
The town houses the Basilica of Saint Philomena which has been important as a pilgrimage site.
