= San Potito Ultra =

- Comune
- Comune di San Potito Ultra
- Location within Italy Location within Campania
- Coordinates: 40°56′N 14°52′E
- Country: Italy
- Region: Campania
- Province: Avellino (AV)
- Frazioni: Atripalda, Candida, Manocalzati, Parolise, Salza Irpina, Sorbo Serpico

Area
  - Total: 4 km^{2} (1.5 sq mi)

Population (1 May 2009)
  - Total: 1,555
  - Density: 390/km^{2} (1,000/sq mi)
- Time zone: UTC+1 (CET)
  - Summer (DST): UTC+2 (CEST)
- Postal code: 83050
- Dialing code: 0825
- ISTAT code: 064086
- Website: Official website

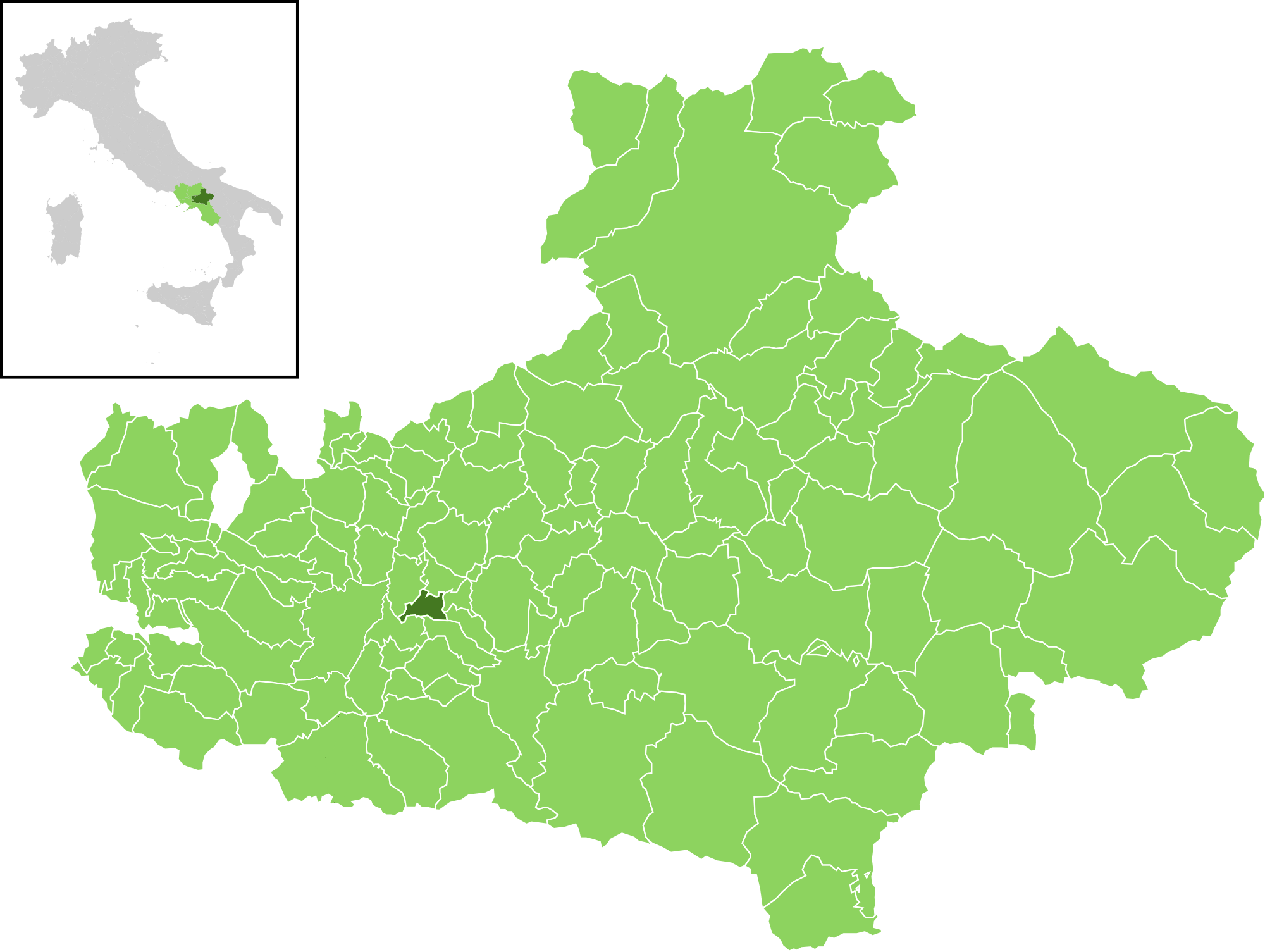
San Potito Ultra's location within the Avellino province

San Potito Ultra is a town and comune in the province of Avellino, Campania, Italy.
