= Contrada =

Contrada may refer to:

== Geography ==
- Contrada is an Italian generic term indicating a limited territorial area.

== Place ==
- Contrada, Campania, town and comune in the province of Avellino, Campania, southern Italy

== Surname ==
- Bruno Contrada, former police chief of Palermo and deputy director of the civil intelligence service SISDE

== See also ==
- Contrade of Siena
- Comune
- Frazione
