= Castelvetere =

Castelvetere may refer to a pair of Italian municipalities of Campania:

- Castelvetere in Val Fortore, in the Province of Benevento
- Castelvetere sul Calore, in the Province of Avellino

== See also ==
- Castelvecchio Subequo, Italian commune in the Abruzzo region, named Castelvetere in the Middle Ages
- Caulonia, Italian municipality of Calabria, named Castelvetere until 1863
