= Faliesi =

Mountain in Italy

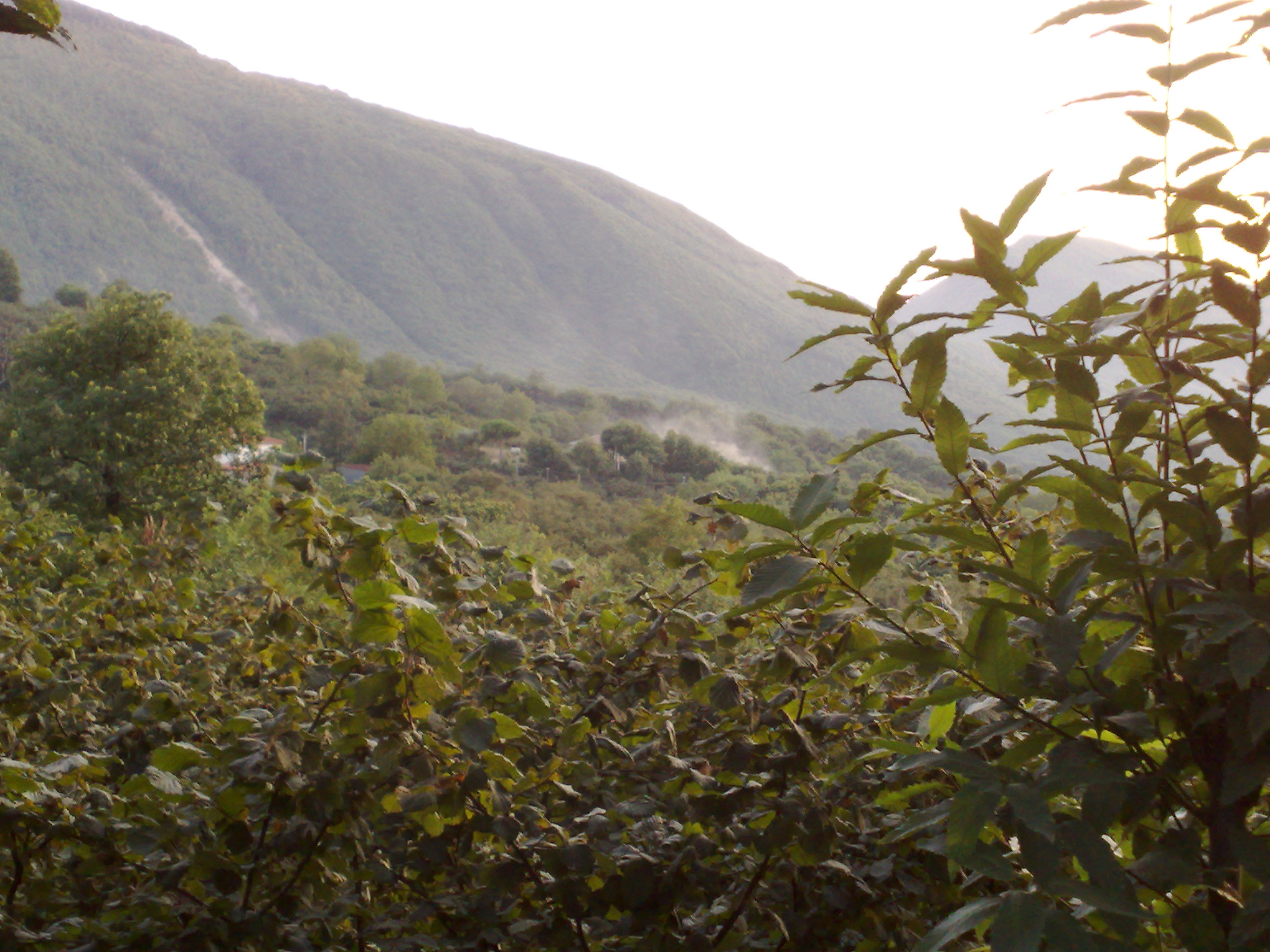

Highest point
- Elevation: 955 m (3,133 ft)
- Coordinates: 40°52′30″N 14°45′55″E

Geography
- Location within Italy
- Location: Avellino, Campania, Italy

Faliesi is a mountain of Campania, Italy.
