= Sperone =

- Comune
- Comune di Sperone
- Coat of arms

- Location within Italy Location within Campania
- Coordinates: 40°57′N 14°36′E
- Country: Italy
- Region: Campania
- Province: Avellino

Government
  - Mayor: Marco Santo Alaia

Area
  - Total: 3 km^{2} (1.2 sq mi)

Population (1 May 2009)
  - Total: 3,654
  - Density: 1,200/km^{2} (3,200/sq mi)
- Demonym: Speronesi
- Time zone: UTC+1 (CET)
  - Summer (DST): UTC+2 (CEST)
- Postal code: 83020
- Dialing code: 081
- Website: Official website

Sperone is a town and comune in the province of Avellino, in the Campania region of southern Italy.

== Geography ==
The town is bordered by Avella, Baiano, Sirignano and Visciano.
