= Franciscan Friary of Folloni =

Historic monastery in Montella, Italy

Coordinates: 40°50′57.37″N 15°02′54.78″E

Convent of Saint Francis at Folloni
- Convento di San Francesco a Folloni
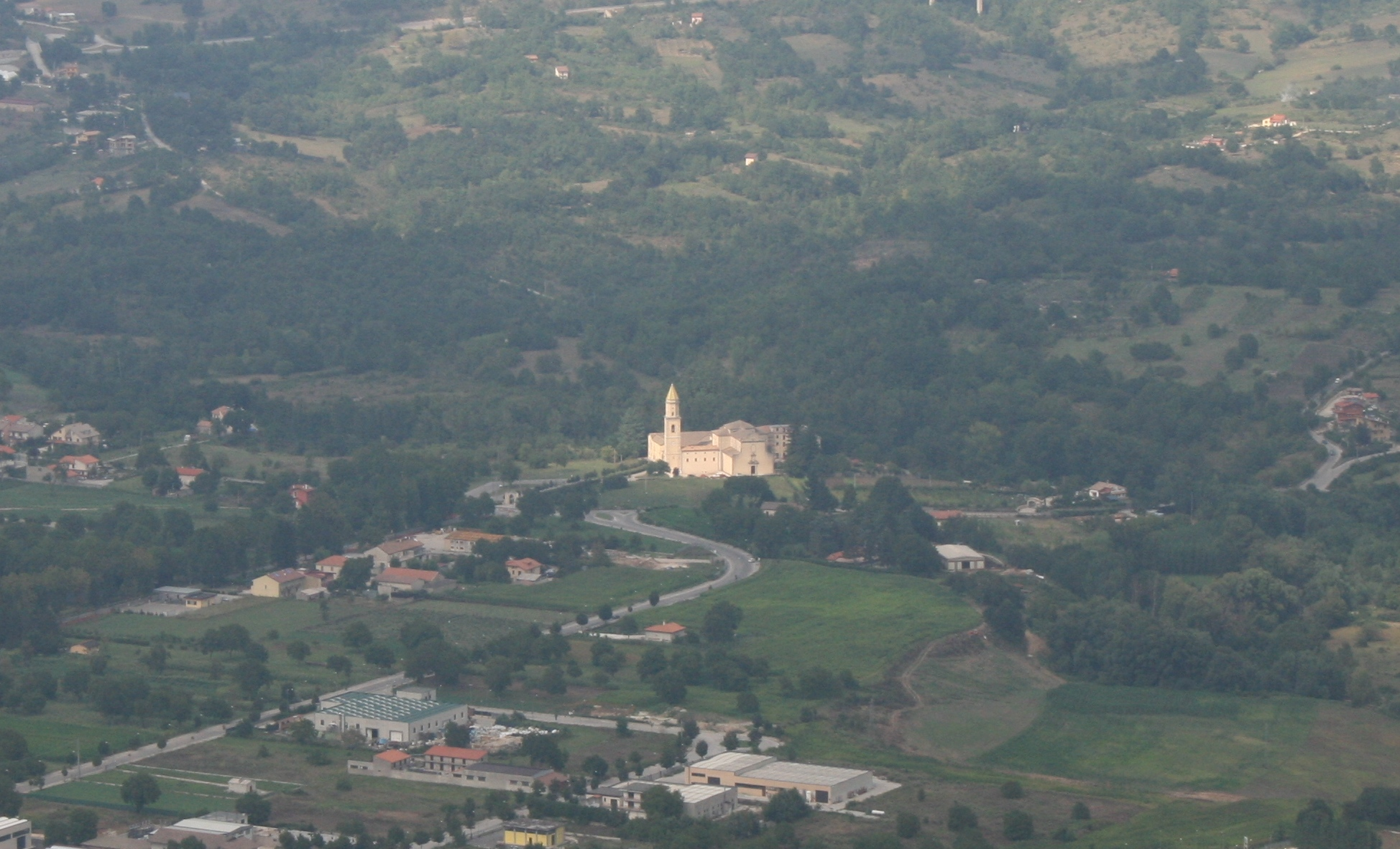
- Interactive map of Convent of Saint Francis at Folloni

Monastery information
- Order: Franciscans
- Established: 1222

People
- Founder: Francis of Assisi

Site
- Location: Montella, Province of Avellino, Italy
- Website: Museum of St. Francis at Folloni (Italian)

The Convent of Saint Francis at Folloni (Italian: Convento di San Francesco a Folloni) is a Franciscan friary located near Montella in the province of Avellino in southern Italy. The monastery was founded by Saint Francis of Assisi in AD 1221–1222.

== History ==
According to tradition, the monastery was founded by Saint Francis of Assisi in the winter of AD 1221–1222. When the saint and a fellow friar tried to enter Montella en route as pilgrims to the Sanctuary of St. Michael the Archangel at Mount Gargano, they were not permitted to do so because of fears of leprosy. They walked a short distance to the Folloni Forest and slept under a tree. They were miraculously shielded from snow, and the friary was found on that spot. A church and an extensive complex were built there after the founding of the friary.

In AD 1732, the friary was demolished by an earthquake. It was rebuilt later in the century, and virtually none of the old friary structures remained above ground.

Archaeologists excavated the cloister walk of the friary in 2007-2008 and 2010. The remains of several hundred people interred there were recovered and studied. Most of the people were from Montella, but one was not from the area. His radiocarbon date range is AD 1050–1249. The scientists suggest he may have been one of the saint's fellow travelers who founded the friary in the 13th century.

Presently, the site also contains a museum. The church was erected in the 18th century, with a single nave and lateral chapels. The interior decoration is rich in stucco. The Bread Sack of St. Francis is in the Crucifix's main chapel. The church also has the cenotaph of Diego I Cavaniglia, Count of Montella, killed in September 1481 during the siege of Otranto for the liberation of the town conquered by the Ottomans in 1480. It was erected by his widow, Margherita Orsini.

== Bread Sack of Saint Francis of Assisi ==
According to tradition, a sack of bread sent by Saint Francis of Assisi appeared on the doorstep of the friary in the winter of 1224. However, the saint was in France at the time, and it was believed that an angel delivered the bread, so this event was considered a miracle. The sack was later used as an altar cloth and then preserved as a relic in the friary. Scientists analyzed part of the sack and determined its radiocarbon date range was AD 1220–1295. They also revealed the presence of ergosterol, a biomarker for the past presence of bread.
