= Grottolella =

- Comune
- Comune di Grottolella
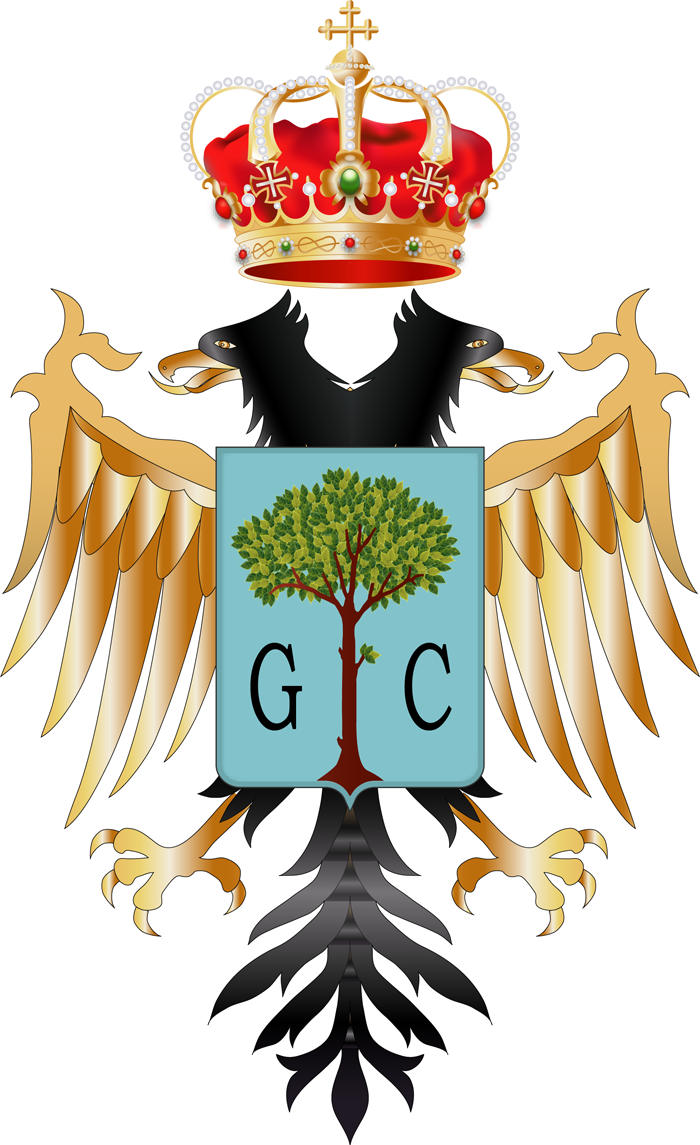
- Coat of arms

- Location within Italy Location within Campania
- Coordinates: 40°58′25″N 14°47′16″E
- Country: Italy
- Region: Campania
- Province: Avellino (AV)
- Frazioni: Pozzo del Sale, Spinelli, Taverna del Monaco, Tropeani

Area
  - Total: 7.12 km^{2} (2.75 sq mi)
- Elevation: 565 m (1,854 ft)

Population (1 May 2009)
  - Total: 2,007
  - Density: 282/km^{2} (730/sq mi)
- Demonym: Grottolellesi
- Time zone: UTC+1 (CET)
  - Summer (DST): UTC+2 (CEST)
- Postal code: 83010
- Dialing code: 0825
- ISTAT code: 064039
- Patron saint: Sant'Egidio abate
- Saint day: 1 September
- Website: Official website

Grottolella is a town and comune in the province of Avellino, Campania, Italy.
It is famous for its fraction Pozzo del Sale; years ago there was a water well here, with saline water inside, from which people used to get salt for free.
