= Aiello del Sabato =

- Comune
- Comune di Aiello del Sabato
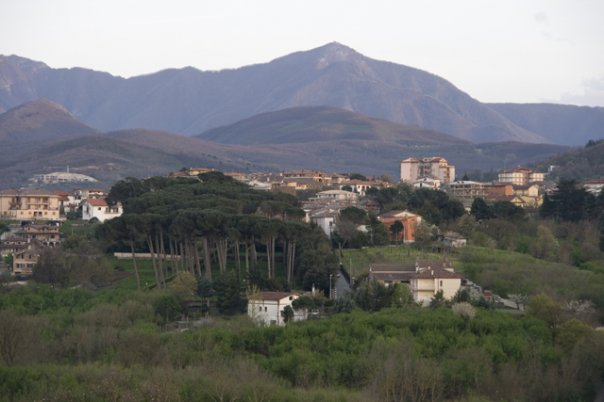

- Coat of arms

- Location of Aiello del Sabato in Italy Aiello del Sabato (Campania)
- Coordinates: 40°53′N 14°49′E
- Country: Italy
- Region: Campania
- Province: Avellino (AV)
- Frazioni: Sabina, San Raffaele, Tavernola San Felice

Government
  - Mayor: Sebastiano Gaeta

Area
  - Total: 10.87 km^{2} (4.20 sq mi)
- Elevation: 425 m (1,394 ft)

Population (30 April 2017)
  - Total: 4,018
  - Density: 369.6/km^{2} (957.4/sq mi)
- Demonym: Aiellesi
- Time zone: UTC+1 (CET)
  - Summer (DST): UTC+2 (CEST)
- Postal code: 83020
- Dialing code: 0825
- Patron saint: St. Sebastian
- Saint day: January 20
- Website: Official website

Aiello del Sabato is a town and comune in the province of Avellino, Campania, southern Italy. Its name derives from the Latin agellus (meaning "field") and from the Sabato river, a tributary of the Calore Irpino.

Archaeological excavations have proven a human presence in the area from as early as the Roman era, and perhaps from the Palaeolithic Age. Aiello was however documented for the first time in 1045 AD.
