= City Museum and Ceramics Gallery (Ariano Irpino) =

Coordinates: 41°09′10″N 15°05′22″E

- Museo civico e della ceramica
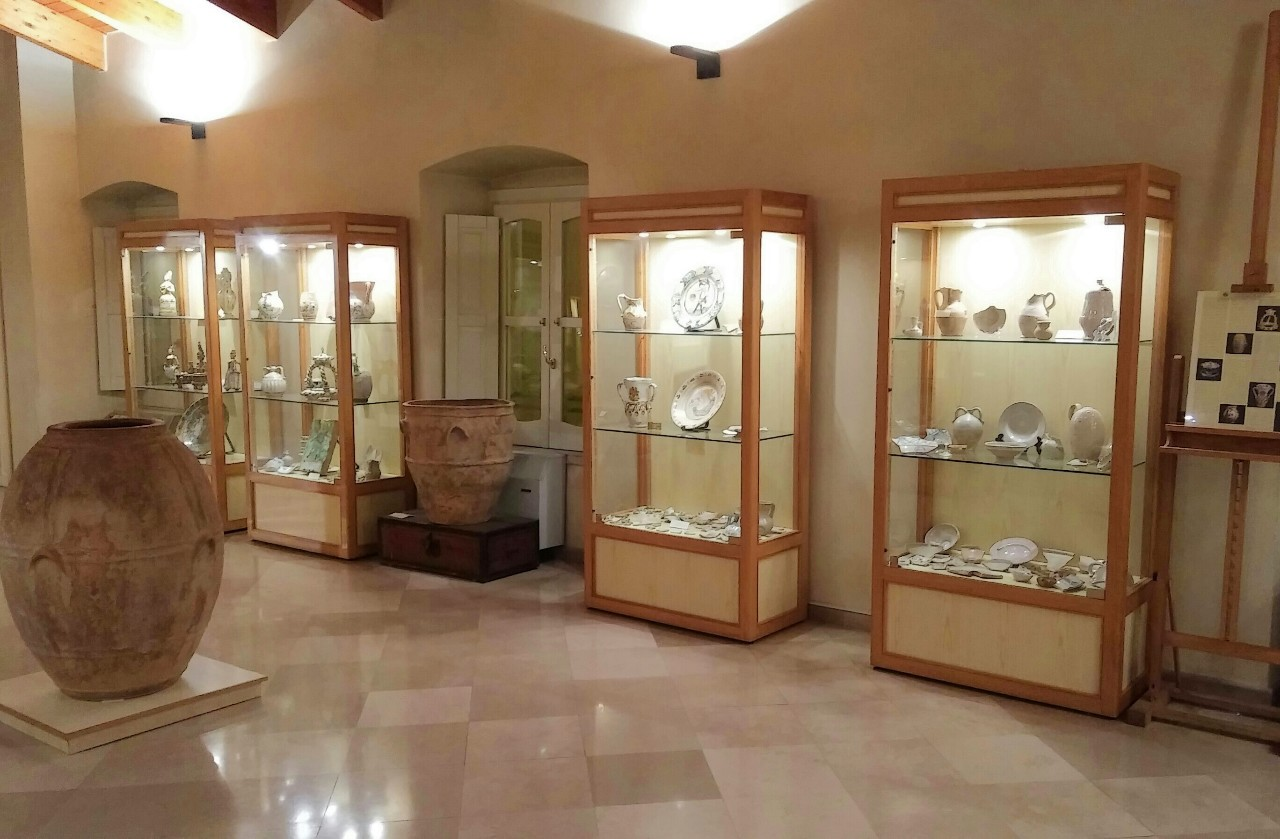
- Location: via D'Afflitto 14, Ariano Irpino, Italy
- Type: print room, ceramics museum

The City Museum and Ceramics Gallery is a print room and ceramics collection in Ariano Irpino in the province of Avellino, Italy.

The city museum maintains a permanent display of rare printed editions of sixteenth and seventeenth centuries works from the libraries of monasteries that stood in the area and were suppressed during the nineteenth century. It also shows a civic photo library from 1865 to 1955 and a modern art gallery.

The ceramics items are based on the private donation of southern-Adriatic ceramics from the 4-5th century BC. A large collection of local maiolica dating mostly from the 17th and 18th centuries are also on display.

== Sources ==
- Italian Ministry of Culture
