= Sant'Andrea di Conza =

Sant'Andrea di Conza Santandreani
- Comune
- Comune di Sant'Andrea di Conza
- Location within Italy Location within Campania
- Coordinates: 40°51′N 15°22′E
- Country: Italy
- Region: Campania
- Province: Province of Avellino (AV)
- Frazioni: no fractures

Government
  - Mayor: Pompeo D'Angola (no party)

Area
  - Total: 6 km^{2} (2.3 sq mi)
- Elevation: 660 m (2,170 ft)

Population (2018-01-01)
  - Total: 1,930
  - Density: 320/km^{2} (830/sq mi)
- Time zone: UTC+1 (CET)
  - Summer (DST): UTC+2 (CEST)
- Postal code: 83053
- Dialing code: 0827
- ISTAT code: 064089
- Website: Official website

Sant'Andrea di Conza is a town and comune in the province of Avellino, Campania, Italy with 1930 inhabitants in 2018.
