= Montefredane =

- Comune
- Comune di Montefredane
- Location within Italy Location within Campania
- Coordinates: 40°58′N 14°49′E
- Country: Italy
- Region: Campania
- Province: Avellino (AV)
- Frazioni: Alimata (Frazione Gaita), Arcella, Boscomagliano (o Bosco Magliano), Montefredane

Government
  - Mayor: Valentino Tropeano

Area
  - Total: 9.45 km^{2} (3.65 sq mi)
- Elevation: 593 m (1,946 ft)

Population (31 December 2017)
  - Total: 2,239
  - Density: 237/km^{2} (614/sq mi)
- Demonym: Montefredanesi
- Time zone: UTC+1 (CET)
  - Summer (DST): UTC+2 (CEST)
- Postal code: 83030
- Dialing code: 0825
- Patron saint: San Nicola
- Saint day: 6 December
- Website: Official website

Montefredane is a comune in the province of Avellino, Campania, southern Italy.

== History ==
The area where Montefredane stands today was inhabited in ancient times by the Samnites. Later, Roman populations settled near the present days village of Arcella. The main buildings of Montefredane date back to the sixth century AD, when the inhabitants of Abellinum (now Atripalda) fled here after the destruction of their village. In the Middle Ages, Montefredane was mentioned in the Catalogus Baronum (1150–68) as part of the county of Avellino. In the following centuries, through ups and downs related to the names of several noble families, such as De Tufo, Capece, Brancaccio and Orsini, Montefredane gained increasing importance, until the plague of 1656 greatly reduced its development. Between 1650 and 1806 the land was owned by the noble family of Caracciolo, who brought it to its former splendor with the construction of the castle. The town was badly damaged by the 1980 Irpinia earthquake.
