= Petruro Irpino =

- Comune
- Comune di Petruro Irpino
- Location within Italy Location within Campania
- Coordinates: 41°2′N 14°48′E
- Country: Italy
- Region: Campania
- Province: Avellino (AV)

Government
  - Mayor: Giuseppe Lombardi

Area
  - Total: 3.14 km^{2} (1.21 sq mi)
- Elevation: 500 m (1,600 ft)

Population (31 August 2017)
  - Total: 345
  - Density: 110/km^{2} (285/sq mi)
- Demonym: Petruresi
- Time zone: UTC+1 (CET)
  - Summer (DST): UTC+2 (CEST)
- Postal code: 83010
- Dialing code: 0825
- Patron saint: St. Bartholomew
- Website: Official website

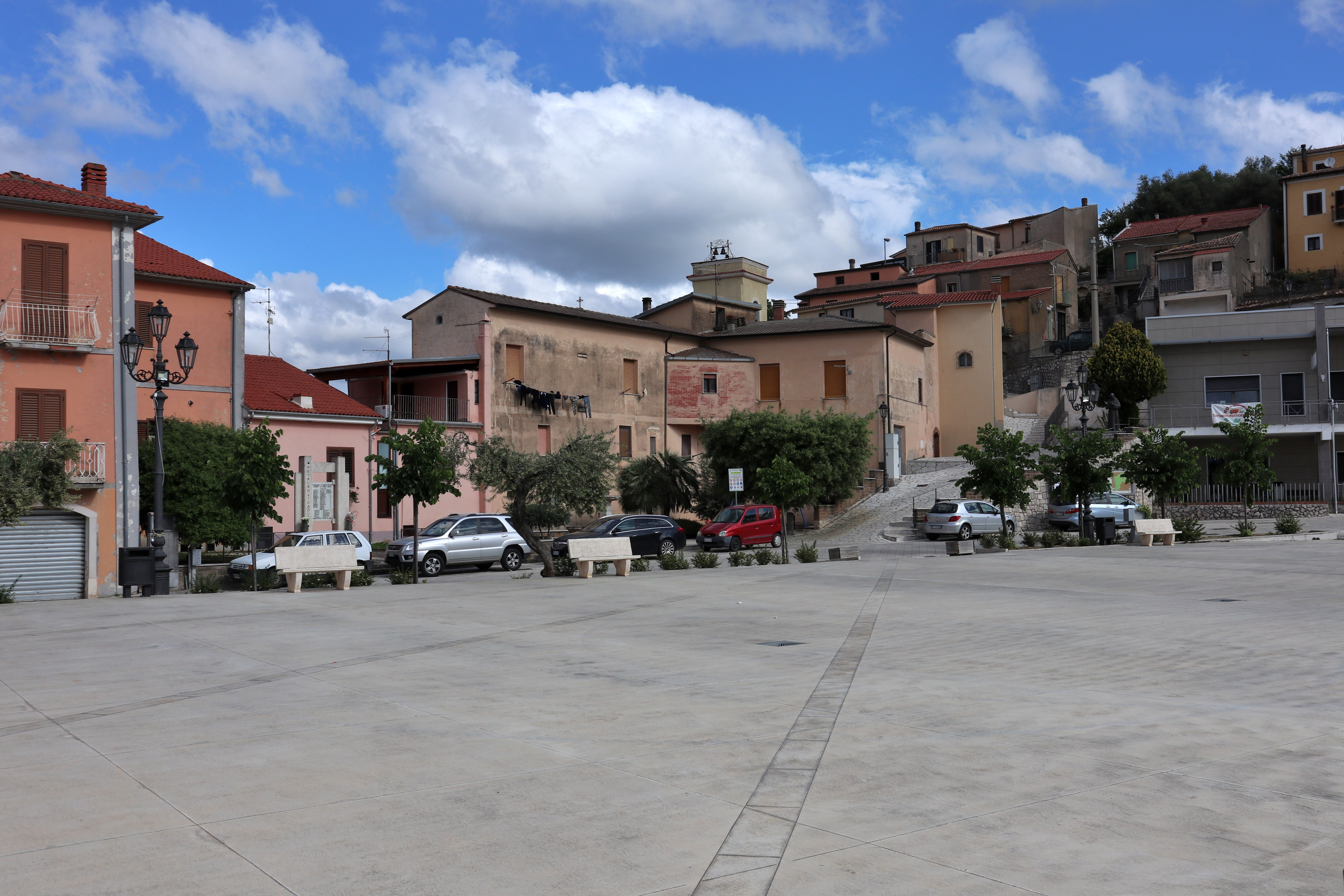
La Nuova Piazza in Petruro Irpino

Petruro Irpino is a town and comune in the province of Avellino, Campania, southern Italy.
