= Quadrelle =

- Comune
- Comune di Quadrelle
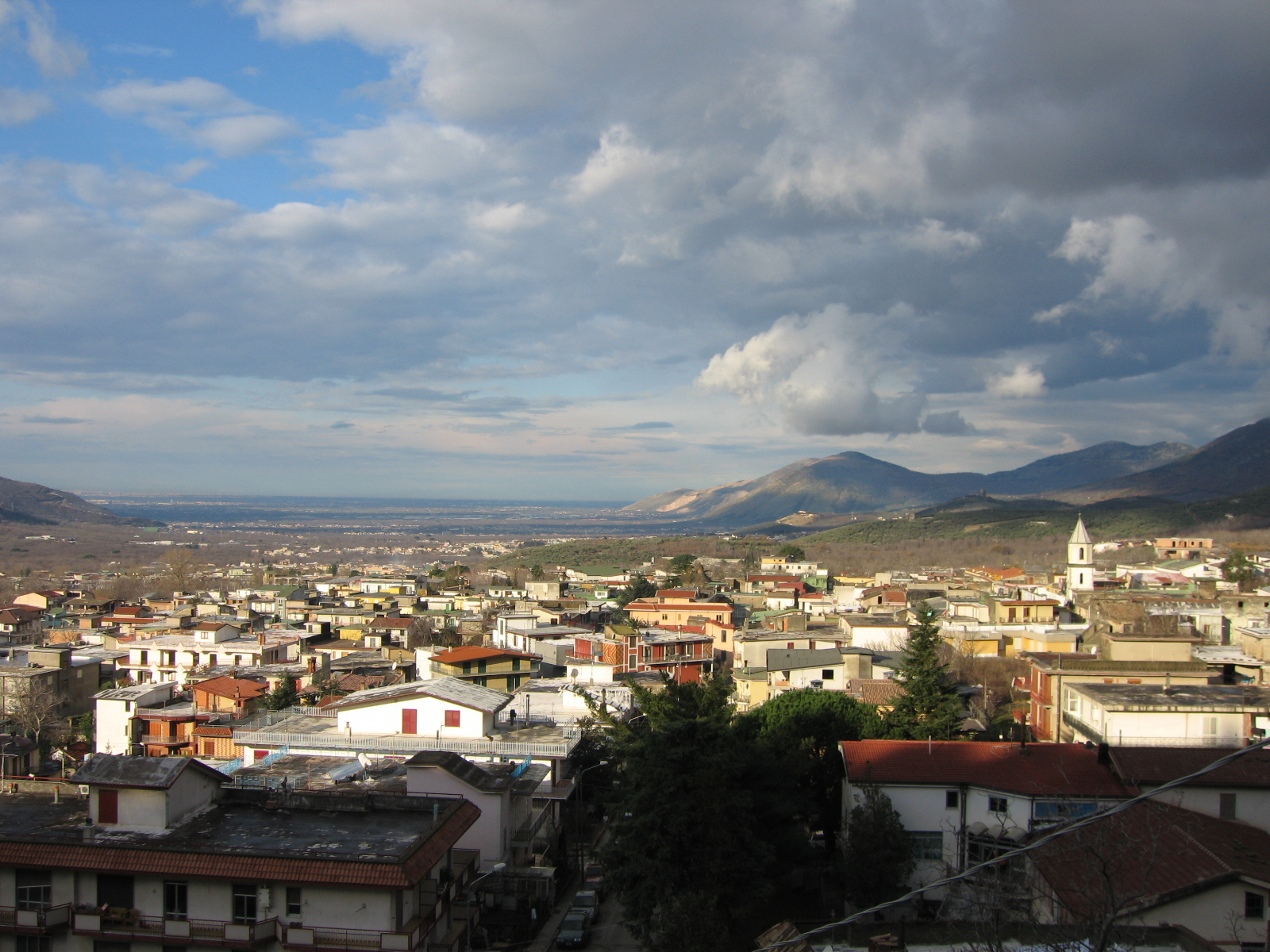
- General view of Quadrelle

- Location within Italy Location within Campania
- Coordinates: 40°57′N 14°38′E
- Country: Italy
- Region: Campania
- Province: Avellino (AV)

Area
  - Total: 6 km^{2} (2.3 sq mi)

Population (2018-01-01)
  - Total: 1,574
  - Density: 260/km^{2} (680/sq mi)
- Time zone: UTC+1 (CET)
  - Summer (DST): UTC+2 (CEST)
- Postal code: 83020
- Dialing code: 081
- Website: https://comune.quadrelle.av.it/

Quadrelle is a village and comune of the province of Avellino in the Campania region of southern Italy.

== Festivals ==
Every year, in June, there is a religious festival dedicated to John the Baptist, the village's patron saint. On the 17 January there is a traditional celebration called the Maio of Saint Anthony the Abbot.
