= Domicella =

- Comune
- Comune di Domicella
- Location within Italy Location within Campania
- Coordinates: 40°52′52″N 14°35′19″E
- Country: Italy
- Region: Campania
- Province: Avellino (AV)
- Frazioni: Casamanzi, Casole

Government
  - Mayor: Stefano Corbisiero

Area
  - Total: 6.4 km^{2} (2.5 sq mi)
- Elevation: 200 m (660 ft)

Population (31 December 2017)
  - Total: 1,850
  - Density: 290/km^{2} (750/sq mi)
- Demonym: Domicellesi
- Time zone: UTC+1 (CET)
  - Summer (DST): UTC+2 (CEST)
- Postal code: 83020
- Dialing code: 081
- Patron saint: Saint Nicholas and St. Philip Neri
- Saint day: 26 May
- Website: Official website

Domicella (Irpino: Dimmocella) is a town and comune in the province of Avellino, Campania, southern Italy.

== History ==
Domicella is situated in a wooded basin on the edge of the Lauro Valley. Its territory was frequented from the late Republican age, when agricultural settlements arose throughout the area.

Its name derives from the Latin domus-cella (lett. Storage house, granary, also in the meaning of dwelling of slaves devoted to agriculture), or according to others, from domus Coeli (lett. villa dei Coelia, noble family of Roman landowners whose presence is attested in the imperial age in Pompeii from Nola). The locality is mentioned in a 15th-century writing by Ambrogio Leone with the name of Democella.

The first mention of the village in the Middle Ages is in a notarial deed of 979, where it is stated that the Lombard prince Pandolfo donated to Martino, abbot of S. Maria di Spelonca, everything he owned in Domicella. A document dated 982 mentions Pietro, Giovanni and other inhabitants of the farmhouse who make arrangements on a land "posito in Domucella ubi furche vocatur". Another deed of donation of 1037 speaks of a "Caputo de loco Democella, finibus Lauri", which grants the church of S. Maria di Spelonca part of its properties in the Scoropeta district.

The small village was already in possession of a church dedicated to the Madonna delle Grazie in 1093, the year in which the same building was donated by the Saxon bishop to the Benedictine Fathers of S. Lorenzo d'Aversa.

From the second half of the XI century, the farmhouse was purchased by the princes of Capua, Giordano and Riccardo, who are mentioned in an act of 1087 in which the ecclesiam s. Mariae de Domocella is confirmed to belong to the feudal abbey of San Lorenzo d'Aversa, which came definitively into possession of the village a few years later. In 1187 it still owned most of the lands and houses.

With the end of the Norman domination (1199) the farmhouse was included, in the same way as the other small towns in the valley, in the feud of Lauro and, in 1270, of Raimondo de Vaudemond. Later Domicella was owned by Balzo (1277), Orsini di Nola (1352), Sanseverino (1529), Pignatelli (1541) and Lancellotti (1632). Administratively it was part of the Land of Work and passed in 1861 to the province of Irpinia of which it is still the last strip towards the Neapolitan.

== Sights and places of interest ==
In Domicella there is a Benedictine structure built in the eleventh century, which in the past was in a bad state of preservation but today has returned to its ancient beauty thanks to a careful restoration. In Domicella there is also a church dedicated to St. Nicholas of Bari built in the eleventh century.
