= Contrada, Campania =

Contrada
- Comune
- Comune di Contrada
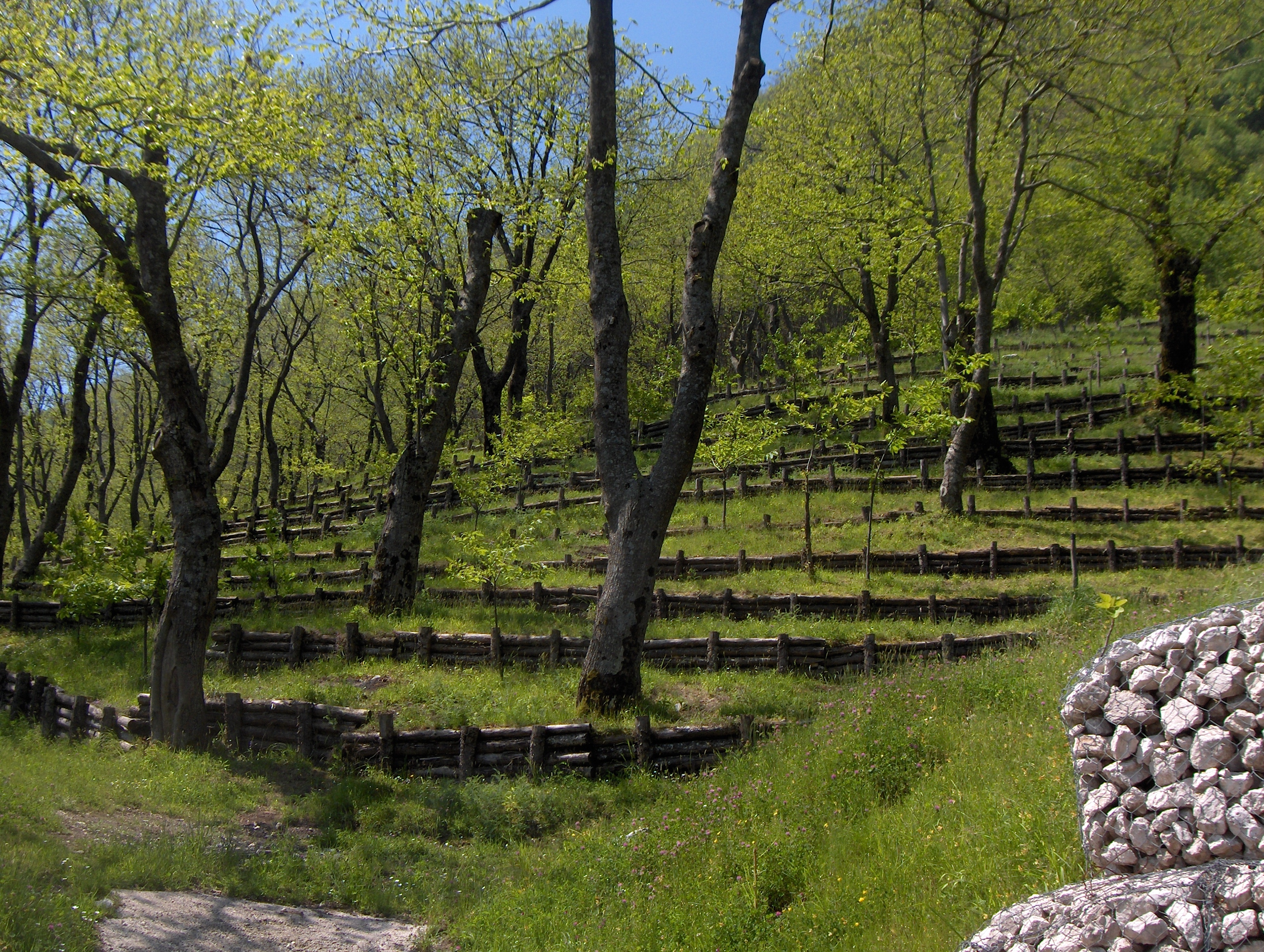

- Location within Italy Location within Campania
- Coordinates: 40°52′1″N 14°46′47″E
- Country: Italy
- Region: Campania
- Province: Avellino (AV)

Area
  - Total: 10.31 km^{2} (3.98 sq mi)
- Elevation: 420 m (1,380 ft)

Population (2005)
  - Total: 2,986
  - Density: 289.6/km^{2} (750.1/sq mi)
- Demonym: Contradesi
- Time zone: UTC+1 (CET)
  - Summer (DST): UTC+2 (CEST)
- Postal code: 83020
- Dialing code: 0825
- Patron saint: St. Michael Archangel
- Saint day: May 8
- Website: Official website

Contrada is a town and comune in the province of Avellino, Campania, southern Italy.

== Culture ==
=== Notable people ===
Antonio Ammaturo, police officer, Vicequestore (assistant chief), head of Squadra Mobile of the Police Headquarters in Naples, responsible for a vivid contrast to the activities of criminal organizations in the territory of Southern Italy, especially against Camorra in the Neapolitan area, killed by a terrorist commando of Brigate Rosse in unclear circumstances, in Piazza Nicola Amore in Naples, 15 July 1982. Ammaturo was famous for his strong opposition to the famous criminal boss Raffaele Cutolo.
