= Paternopoli =

- Comune
- Comune di Paternopoli
- Location within Italy Location within Campania
- Coordinates: 40°58′N 15°2′E
- Country: Italy
- Region: Campania
- Province: Avellino (AV)

Government
  - Mayor: Salvatore Cogliano

Area
  - Total: 18.43 km^{2} (7.12 sq mi)
- Elevation: 480 m (1,570 ft)

Population (31 December 2017)
  - Total: 2,377
  - Density: 129.0/km^{2} (334.0/sq mi)
- Demonym: Paternesi
- Time zone: UTC+1 (CET)
  - Summer (DST): UTC+2 (CEST)
- Postal code: 83052
- Dialing code: 0827
- Patron saint: St. Nicholas
- Saint day: 6 December
- Website: Official website

Paternopoli is a town and comune in the province of Avellino, Campania, southern Italy.
