= Prata di Principato Ultra =

- Comune
- Comune di Prata di Principato Ultra
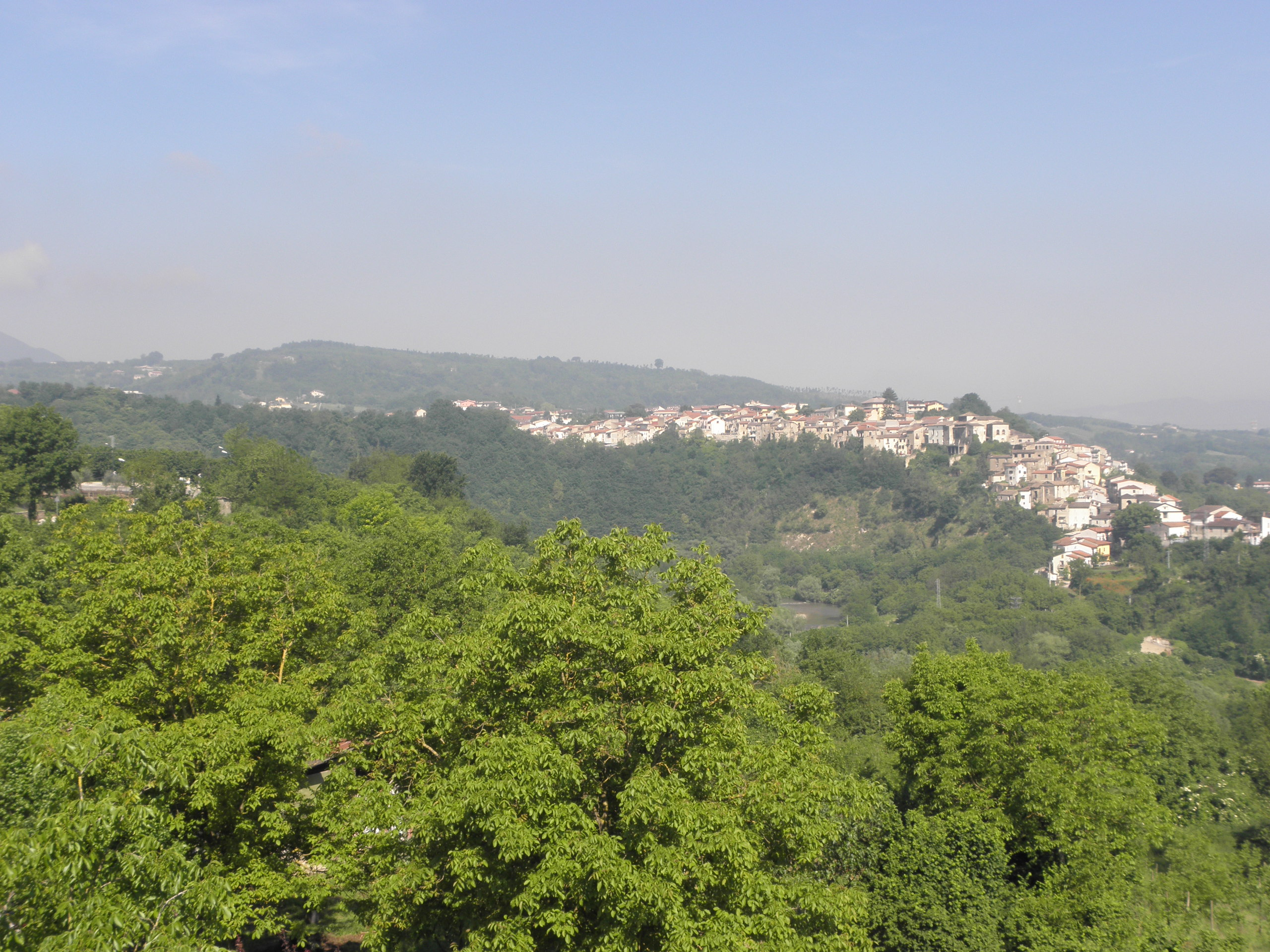
- Panorama of Prata from the hills on the right bank of the Sabato river

- Location within Italy Location within Campania
- Coordinates: 40°59′N 14°50′E
- Country: Italy
- Region: Campania
- Province: Avellino (AV)
- Frazioni: Tavernanova, Ponte Sabato

Government
  - Mayor: Bruno Francesco Petruzziello

Area
  - Total: 10.99 km^{2} (4.24 sq mi)
- Elevation: 310 m (1,020 ft)

Population (31 December 2017)
  - Total: 3,040
  - Density: 277/km^{2} (716/sq mi)
- Demonym: Pratesi
- Time zone: UTC+1 (CET)
  - Summer (DST): UTC+2 (CEST)
- Postal code: 83030
- Dialing code: 0825
- Patron saint: St. James
- Saint day: 25 July
- Website: Official website

Prata di Principato Ultra is a town and comune of the province of Avellino in the Campania region of southern Italy. The town spread along a hill on the left shore of the Sabato river. The place is mentioned for the first time in a historical document in 1070.
