= Cesinali =

- Comune
- Comune di Cesinali
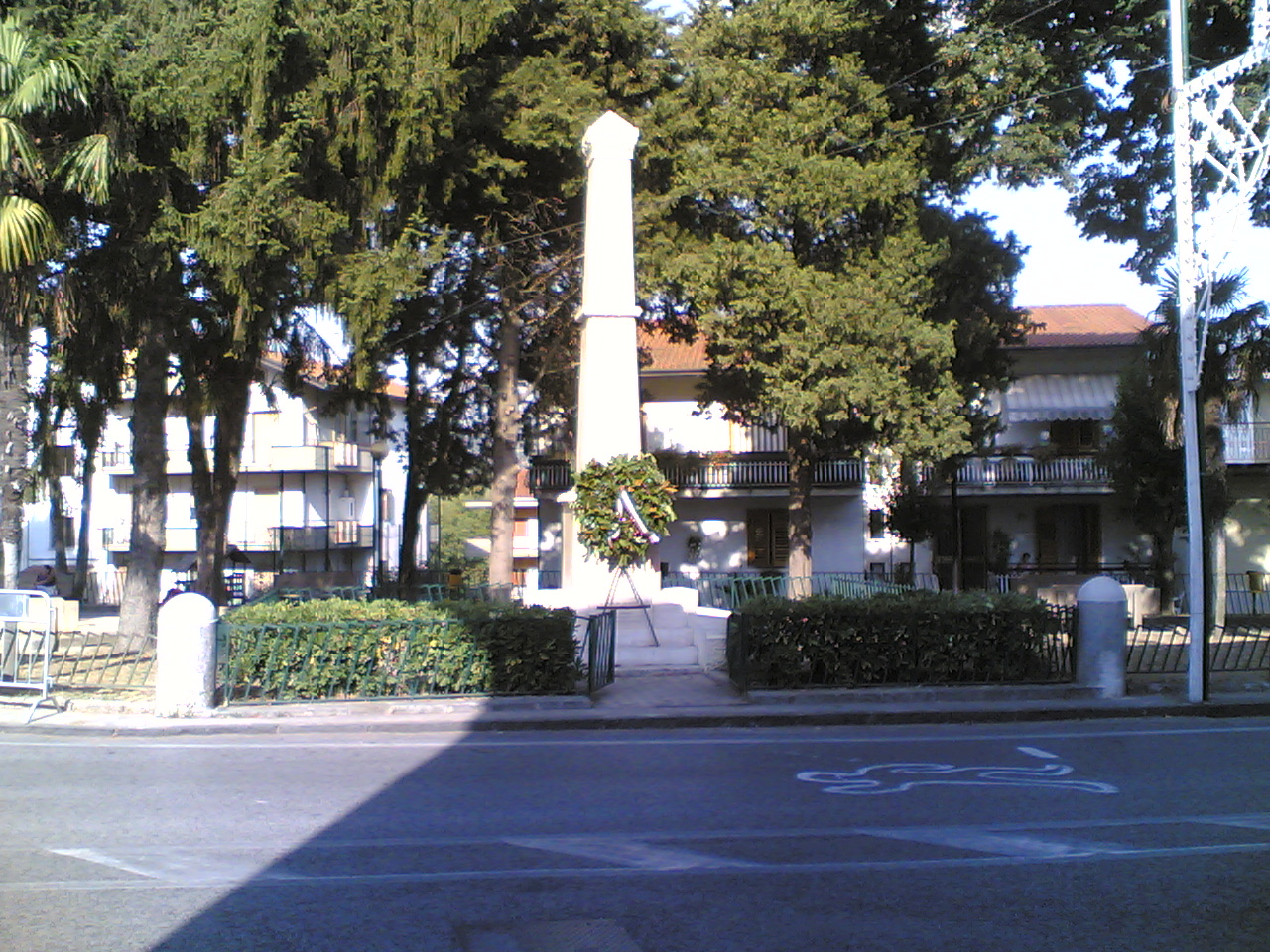

- Location within Italy Location within Campania
- Coordinates: 40°53′53″N 14°49′43″E
- Country: Italy
- Region: Campania
- Province: Avellino (AV)
- Frazioni: Villa San Nicola

Government
  - Mayor: Dario Fiore

Area
  - Total: 3.73 km^{2} (1.44 sq mi)
- Elevation: 380 m (1,250 ft)

Population (31 December 2017)
  - Total: 2,594
  - Density: 695/km^{2} (1,800/sq mi)
- Demonym: Cesinalesi
- Time zone: UTC+1 (CET)
  - Summer (DST): UTC+2 (CEST)
- Postal code: 83020
- Dialing code: 0825
- Patron saint: St. Sylvester and St. Roch
- Saint day: 31 December
- Website: Official website

Cesinali (Irpino: Ggisinàli, IPA: [dʒisiˈnɑːli]) is a town and comune in the province of Avellino, Campania, southern Italy. It is an agricultural center.
