= Altavilla Irpina =

- Comune
- Comune di Altavilla Irpina
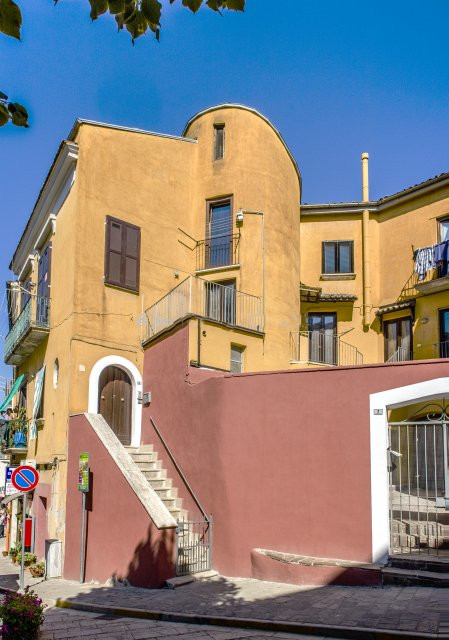

- Location within Italy Location within Campania
- Coordinates: 41°0′29″N 14°46′56″E
- Country: Italy
- Region: Campania
- Province: Avellino (AV)
- Frazioni: San Trifone, Pannone di sotto, Pannone di sopra, Belvedere, Ponte dei Santi, Pincera, Toro, Sassano, Russo

Government
  - Mayor: Mario Vanni

Area
  - Total: 14.08 km^{2} (5.44 sq mi)
- Elevation: 334 m (1,096 ft)

Population (30 April 2017)
  - Total: 4,152
  - Density: 294.9/km^{2} (763.8/sq mi)
- Demonym: Altavillesi
- Time zone: UTC+1 (CET)
  - Summer (DST): UTC+2 (CEST)
- Postal code: 83011
- Dialing code: 0825
- Patron saint: St. Bernardine of Siena and St. Peregrine the Martyr
- Saint day: May 20 and August 24, respectively.
- Website: Official website

Altavilla Irpina is a town and comune in the province of Avellino, Campania, southern Italy.

== History ==
According to some scholars, it would coincide with the Poetilia mentioned by Vergil in his Aeneid. The town had subsequently the names of Scandiano, Altacoda, Altacauda, sino until the current, deriving from the Norman Hauteville family.

== Transportation ==
It has a station on the Avellino-Benevento railway line.
