= San Michele di Serino =

- Comune
- Comune di San Michele di Serino
- Coat of arms

- Location within Italy Location within Campania
- Coordinates: 40°53′N 14°51′E
- Country: Italy
- Region: Campania
- Province: Avellino (AV)

Government
  - Mayor: Michele Boccia

Area
  - Total: 4.47 km^{2} (1.73 sq mi)
- Elevation: 364 m (1,194 ft)

Population (31 December 2010)
  - Total: 2,602
  - Density: 582/km^{2} (1,510/sq mi)
- Demonym: Sammichelesi
- Time zone: UTC+1 (CET)
  - Summer (DST): UTC+2 (CEST)
- Postal code: 83020
- Dialing code: 0825
- Patron saint: St. Michael Archangel
- Saint day: 29 September
- Website: Official website

San Michele di Serino is a town and comune in the province of Avellino, Campania, southern Italy.
