= Moschiano =

- Comune
- Comune di Moschiano
- Location within Italy Location within Campania
- Coordinates: 40°52′N 14°40′E
- Country: Italy
- Region: Campania
- Province: Avellino (AV)

Government
  - Mayor: Angelo Mazzocca

Area
  - Total: 13 km^{2} (5.0 sq mi)
- Elevation: 276 m (906 ft)

Population (31 December 2010)
  - Total: 1,701
  - Density: 130/km^{2} (340/sq mi)
- Demonym: Moschianesi
- Time zone: UTC+1 (CET)
  - Summer (DST): UTC+2 (CEST)
- Postal code: 83020
- Dialing code: 081
- Website: Official website

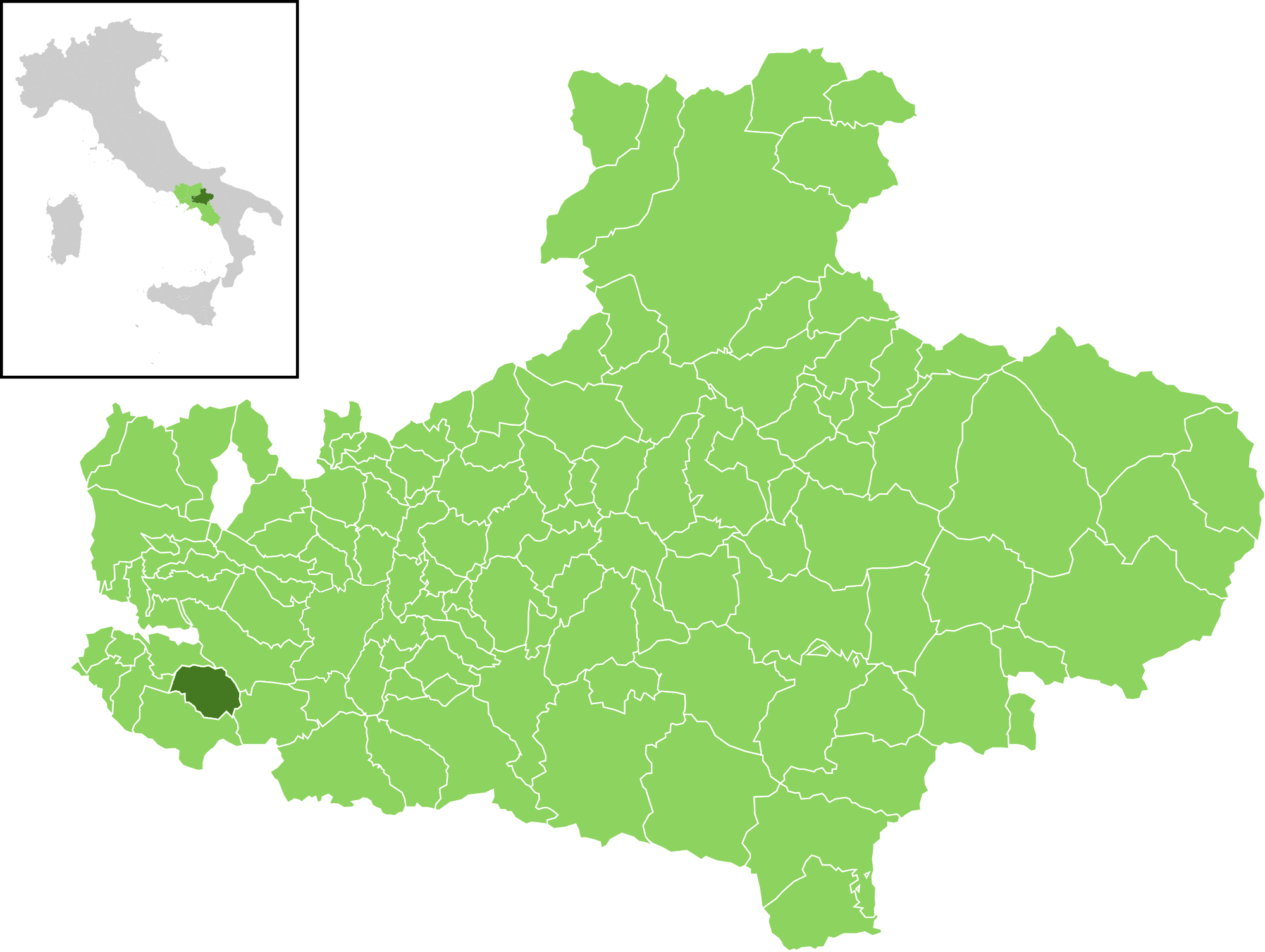

Moschiano is a town and comune in the province of Avellino, Campania, southern Italy.
