= Sorbo Serpico =

- Comune
- Comune di Sorbo Serpico
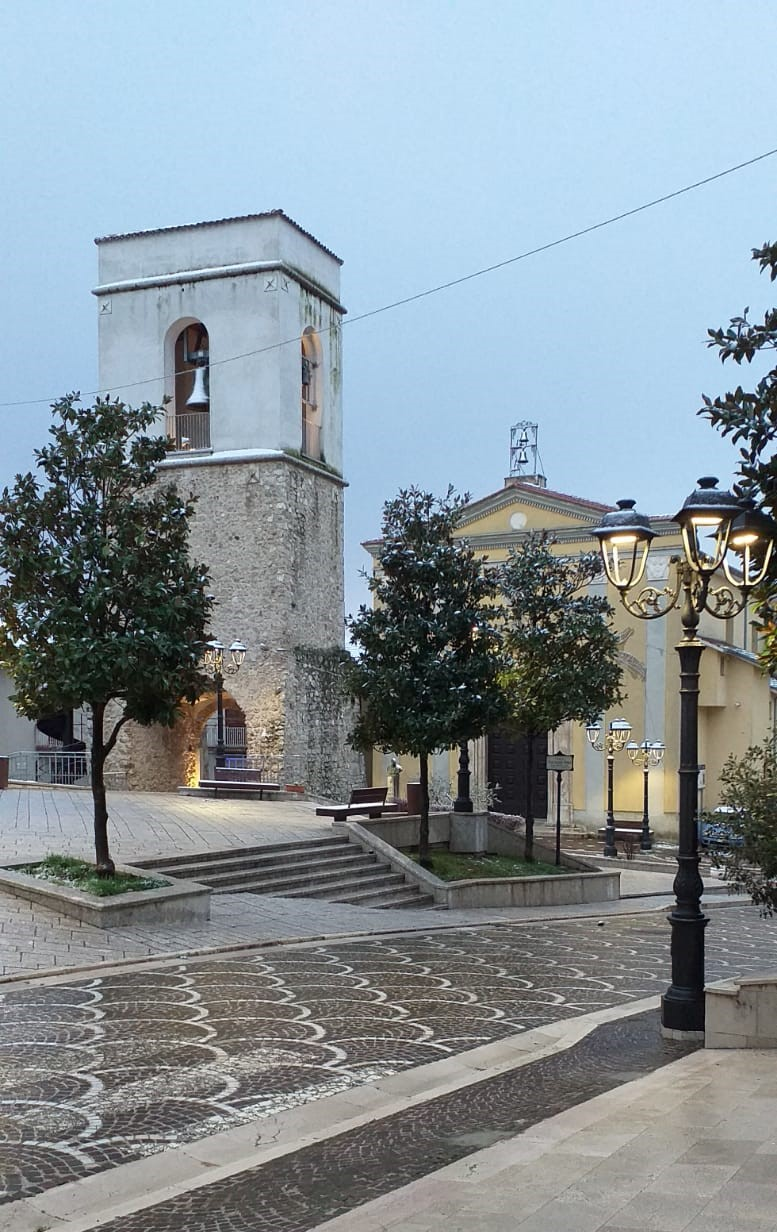

- Location within Italy Location within Campania
- Coordinates: 40°55′N 14°53′E
- Country: Italy
- Region: Campania
- Province: Avellino (AV)

Government
  - Mayor: Maria Teresa Fontanella

Area
  - Total: 8.1 km^{2} (3.1 sq mi)
- Elevation: 500 m (1,600 ft)

Population (31 December 2017)
  - Total: 602
  - Density: 74/km^{2} (190/sq mi)
- Demonym: Sorbesi
- Time zone: UTC+1 (CET)
  - Summer (DST): UTC+2 (CEST)
- Postal code: 83050
- Dialing code: 0825
- Website: Official website

Sorbo Serpico is a town and comune in the province of Avellino, Campania, southern Italy. Three villages with the name Sorbo are Sorbo-Ocagnano on the island of Corsica, Sorbo Serpico in the region of Campania, and Sorbo San Basile in the region of Calabria.
