= Lapio =

- Comune
- Comune di Lapio
- Location within Italy Location within Campania
- Coordinates: 40°58′56″N 14°56′50″E
- Country: Italy
- Region: Campania
- Province: Avellino (AV)

Government
  - Mayor: Maria Teresa Lepore

Area
  - Total: 15.03 km^{2} (5.80 sq mi)
- Elevation: 500 m (1,600 ft)

Population (31 December 2010)
  - Total: 1,648
  - Density: 109.6/km^{2} (284.0/sq mi)
- Demonym: Lapiani
- Time zone: UTC+1 (CET)
  - Summer (DST): UTC+2 (CEST)
- Postal code: 83030
- Dialing code: 0825
- Patron saint: St. Peter Martyr
- Saint day: 29 April
- Website: Official website

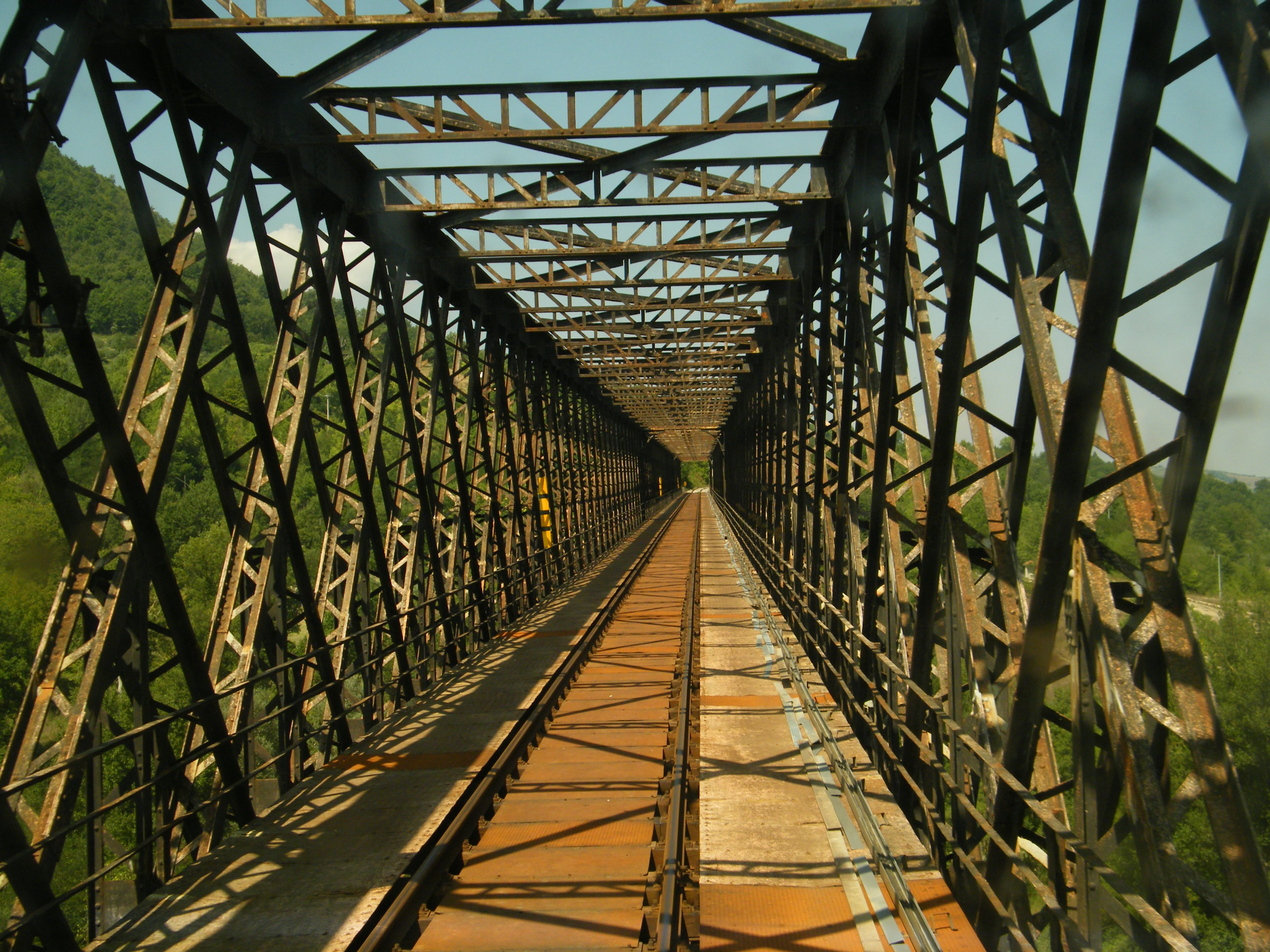
Ponte Principe bridge in Lapio, 2009

Lapio is a town and comune in the province of Avellino, Campania, southern Italy.

Lapio includes the frazioni of Casale Monaci, Case sparse, Cerreto, Cortejoanna, Crete, Fortuna, Tognano, and Arianiello.
