= Salza Irpina =

- Comune
- Comune di Salza Irpina
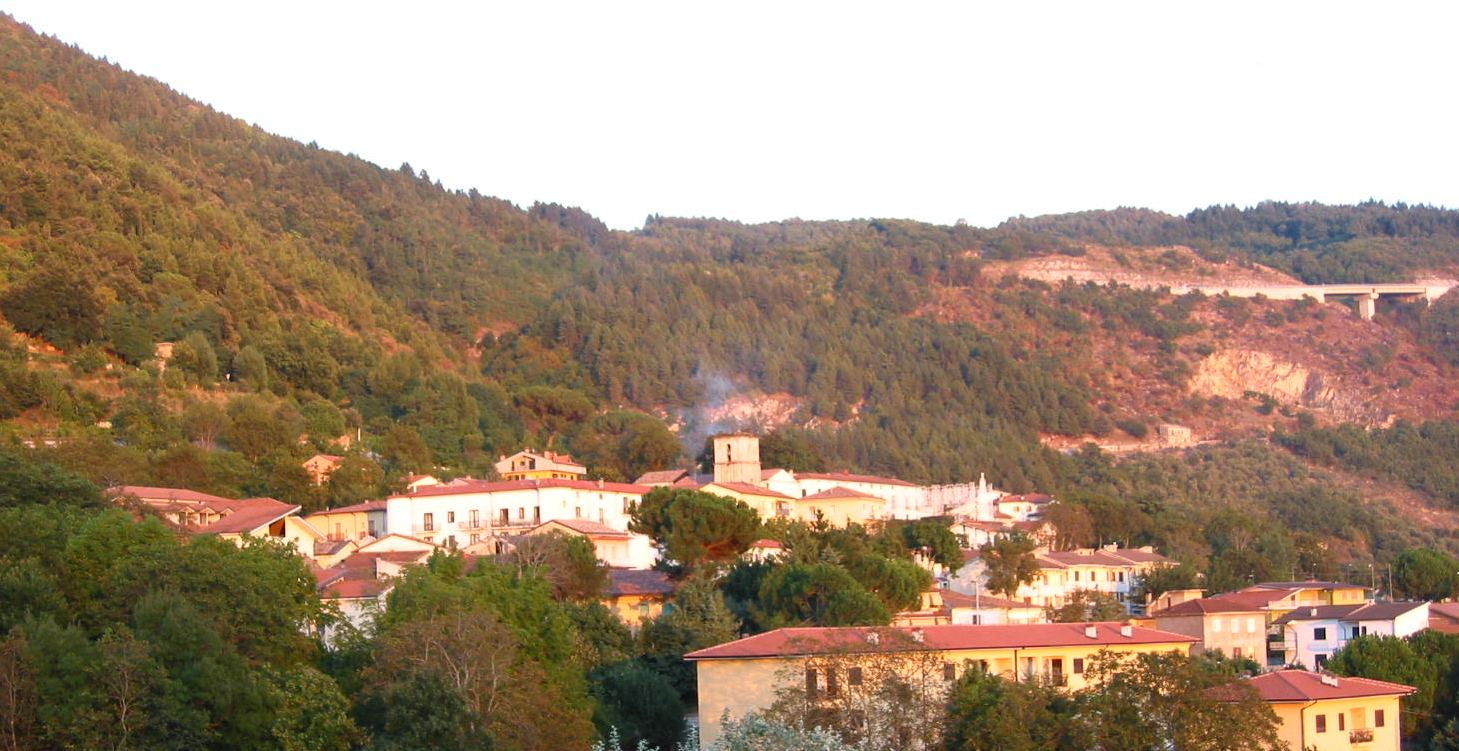

- Location within Italy Location within Campania
- Coordinates: 40°55′N 14°53′E
- Country: Italy
- Region: Campania
- Province: Avellino (AV)

Government
  - Mayor: Gerardo Iandolo

Area
  - Total: 4.96 km^{2} (1.92 sq mi)
- Elevation: 547 m (1,795 ft)

Population (31 December 2017)
  - Total: 742
  - Density: 150/km^{2} (387/sq mi)
- Demonym: Salzesi
- Time zone: UTC+1 (CET)
  - Summer (DST): UTC+2 (CEST)
- Postal code: 83050
- Dialing code: 0825
- Website: Official website

Salza Irpina (Campanian: Sàoza) is a town and comune in the province of Avellino, Campania, southern Italy.
