= Castelvetere sul Calore =

- Comune
- Comune di Castelvetere sul Calore
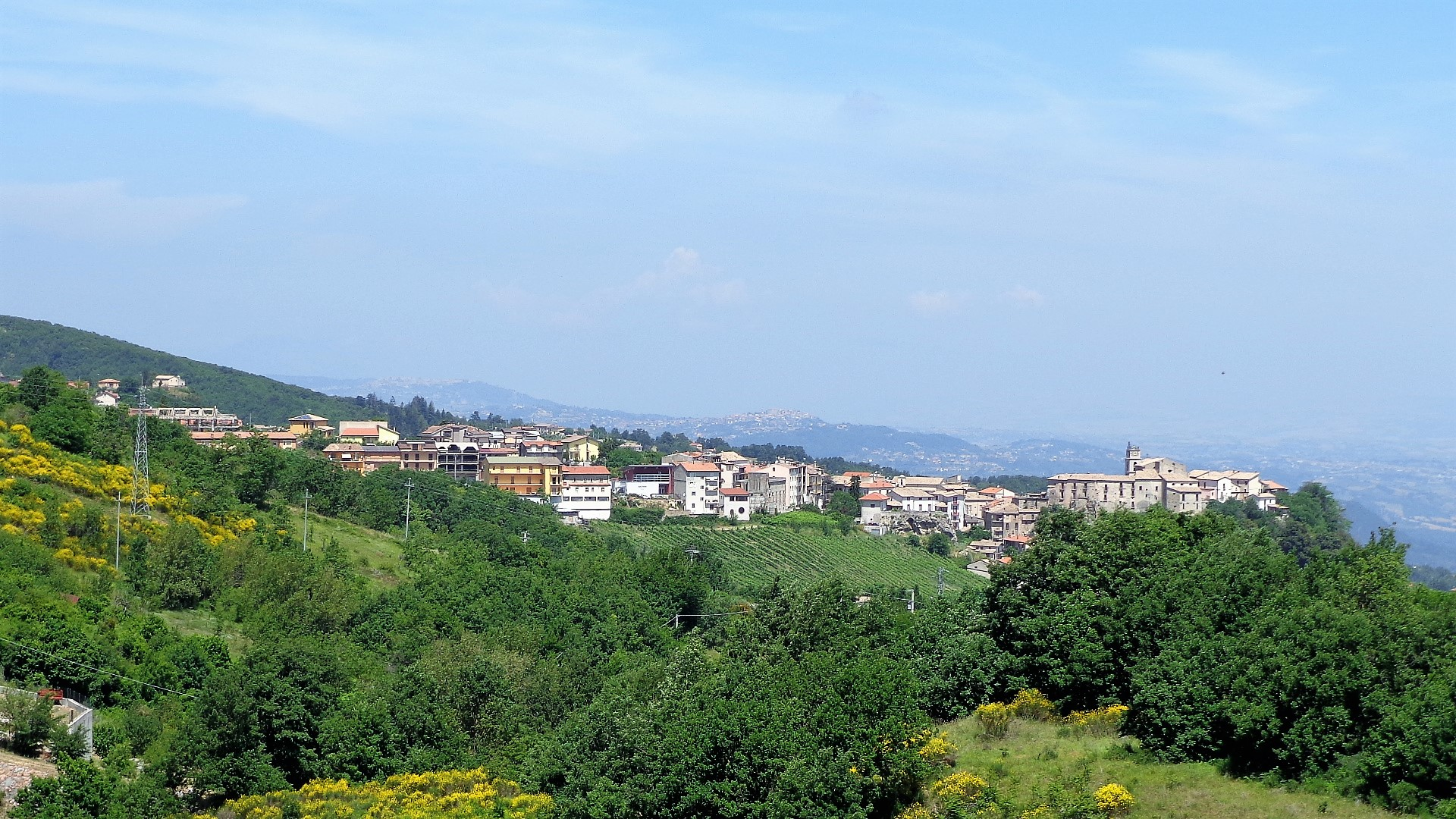

- Coat of arms

- Location within Italy Location within Campania
- Coordinates: 40°55′47″N 14°59′13″E
- Country: Italy
- Region: Campania
- Province: Avellino (AV)
- Frazioni: Campoloprisi, Cipollara, Santa Lucia, Tremauriello, Vioni

Government
  - Mayor: Romano Giovanni Remigio

Area
  - Total: 17.06 km^{2} (6.59 sq mi)
- Elevation: 750 m (2,460 ft)

Population (30 June 2017)
  - Total: 1,580
  - Density: 92.6/km^{2} (240/sq mi)
- Demonym: Castelveteresi
- Time zone: UTC+1 (CET)
  - Summer (DST): UTC+2 (CEST)
- Postal code: 83040
- Dialing code: 0827
- Patron saint: Virgin Mary
- Saint day: 2 July, 28 April
- Website: Official website

Castelvetere sul Calore is a comune in the province of Avellino, Campania, southern Italy. It takes its name from the Calore Irpino river that flows nearby.
