= Sirignano =

- Comune
- Comune di Sirignano
- Coat of arms

- Location within Italy Location within Campania
- Coordinates: 40°57′N 14°38′E
- Country: Italy
- Region: Campania
- Province: Avellino (AV)

Government
  - Mayor: Raffaele Colucci

Area
  - Total: 6 km^{2} (2.3 sq mi)
- Elevation: 270 m (890 ft)

Population (1 May 2009)
  - Total: 2,969
  - Density: 490/km^{2} (1,300/sq mi)
- Demonym: Sirignanesi
- Time zone: UTC+1 (CET)
  - Summer (DST): UTC+2 (CEST)
- Postal code: 83020
- Dialing code: 081
- Website: Official website

Sirignano is a town and comune in the province of Avellino, Campania, Italy.
