= Chiusano di San Domenico =

- Comune
- Comune di Chiusano di San Domenico
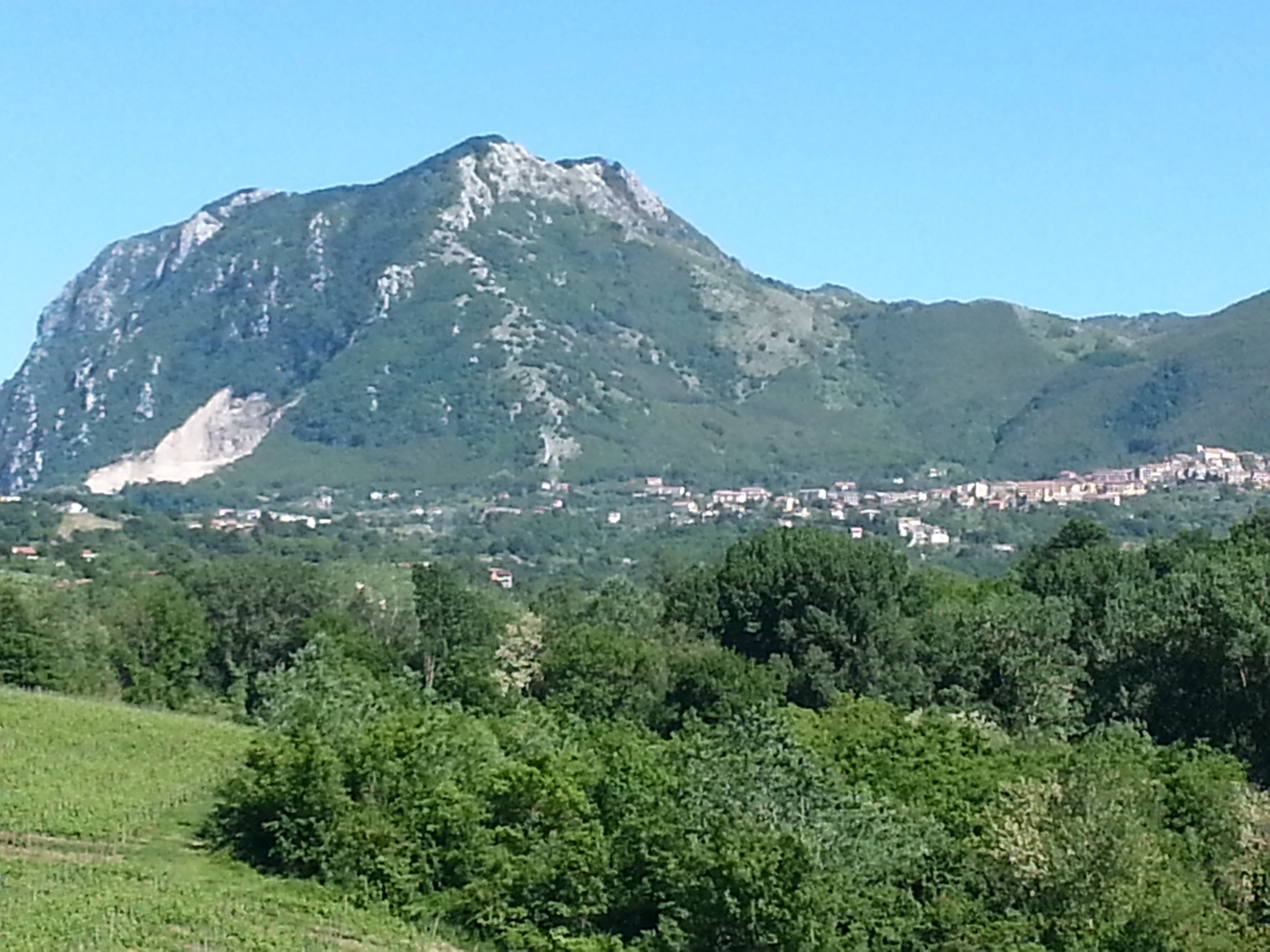
- Monte Tuoro and Chiusano San Domenico.

- Coat of arms

- Location within Italy Location within Campania
- Coordinates: 40°56′3″N 14°55′2″E
- Country: Italy
- Region: Campania
- Province: Avellino (AV)

Government
  - Mayor: Carmine De Angelis

Area
  - Total: 24.6 km^{2} (9.5 sq mi)
- Elevation: 700 m (2,300 ft)

Population (30 June 2017)
  - Total: 2,241
  - Density: 91.1/km^{2} (236/sq mi)
- Demonym: Chiusanesi
- Time zone: UTC+1 (CET)
  - Summer (DST): UTC+2 (CEST)
- Postal code: 83040
- Dialing code: 0825
- Patron saint: St. Michael Archangel
- Saint day: 8 May
- Website: Official website

Chiusano di San Domenico (Irpino: Chiusànë) is a town and comune in the province of Avellino, Campania, southern Italy. Situated at 750 metres (2,460 ft) above sea level, Chiusano is on the western slope of Mount Tuoro.

== History ==
Human presence in Chiusano can be traced to the times of Ancient Rome based on the discovery of coins, pottery, and tombs. During the 11th century the Lombards ruled the area and life in Chiusano centered on a castle that was constructed on nearby Monte Domenico.

== Main sights ==
- Church of Santa Maria degli Angeli (1710)
- Confraternity of the Blessed Sacrament of the Rosary (1712)
- the Hermitage of Santa Maria Valley (1230).
