= Province of Avellino =

Province of Italy

Coordinates: 40°54′55″N 14°47′23″E

Province of Avellino Provincia di Avellino (Italian)
- Province
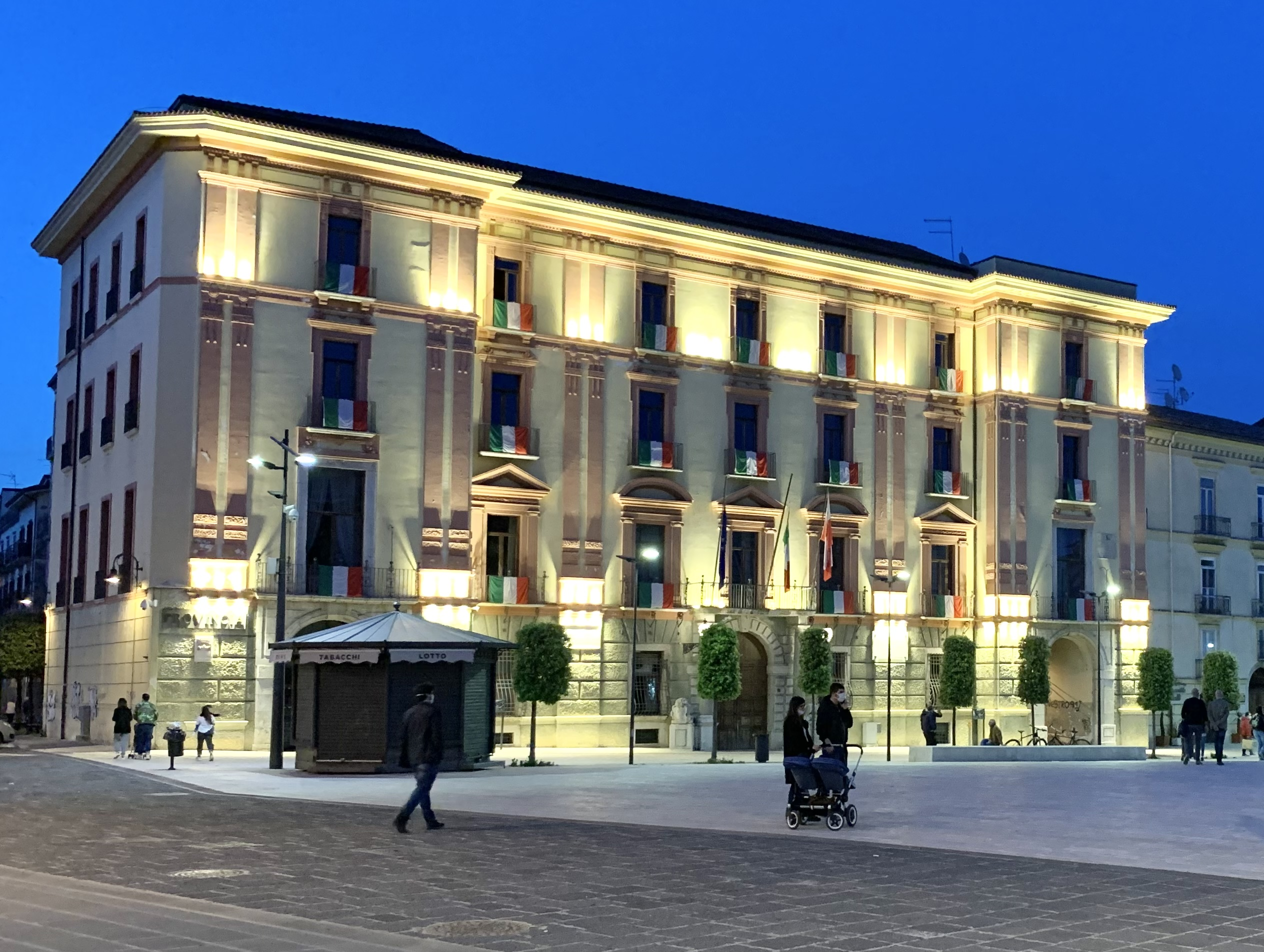
- Palazzo Caracciolo, the provincial seat

- Flag Coat of arms

- Map highlighting the location of the province of Avellino in Italy
- Country: Italy
- Region: Campania
- Capital(s): Avellino
- Municipalities: 118

Government
  - President: Fausto Picone (IV)

Area
  - Total: 2,806.07 km^{2} (1,083.43 sq mi)

Population (2026)
  - Total: 393,093
  - Density: 140.087/km^{2} (362.823/sq mi)

GDP
  - Total: €7.467 billion (2015)
  - Per capita: €17,502 (2015)
- Time zone: UTC+1 (CET)
  - Summer (DST): UTC+2 (CEST)
- Postal code: 83010-83018, 83020-83032, 83034-83054, 83056-83059
- Telephone prefix: 081, 082, 0824, 0825, 0827, 0835
- Vehicle registration: AV
- ISTAT code: 064

The Province of Avellino (Italian: provincia di Avellino) is a province in the region of Campania in southern Italy. Its capital is the city of Avellino. It has a population of 393,093 in an area of 2,806.07 square kilometres (1,083.43 sq mi) across its 118 municipalities.

It is an inner province, with no connection to the sea. The area is characterized by numerous small towns and villages scattered across the province; only two towns have a population over 20,000.

== History ==
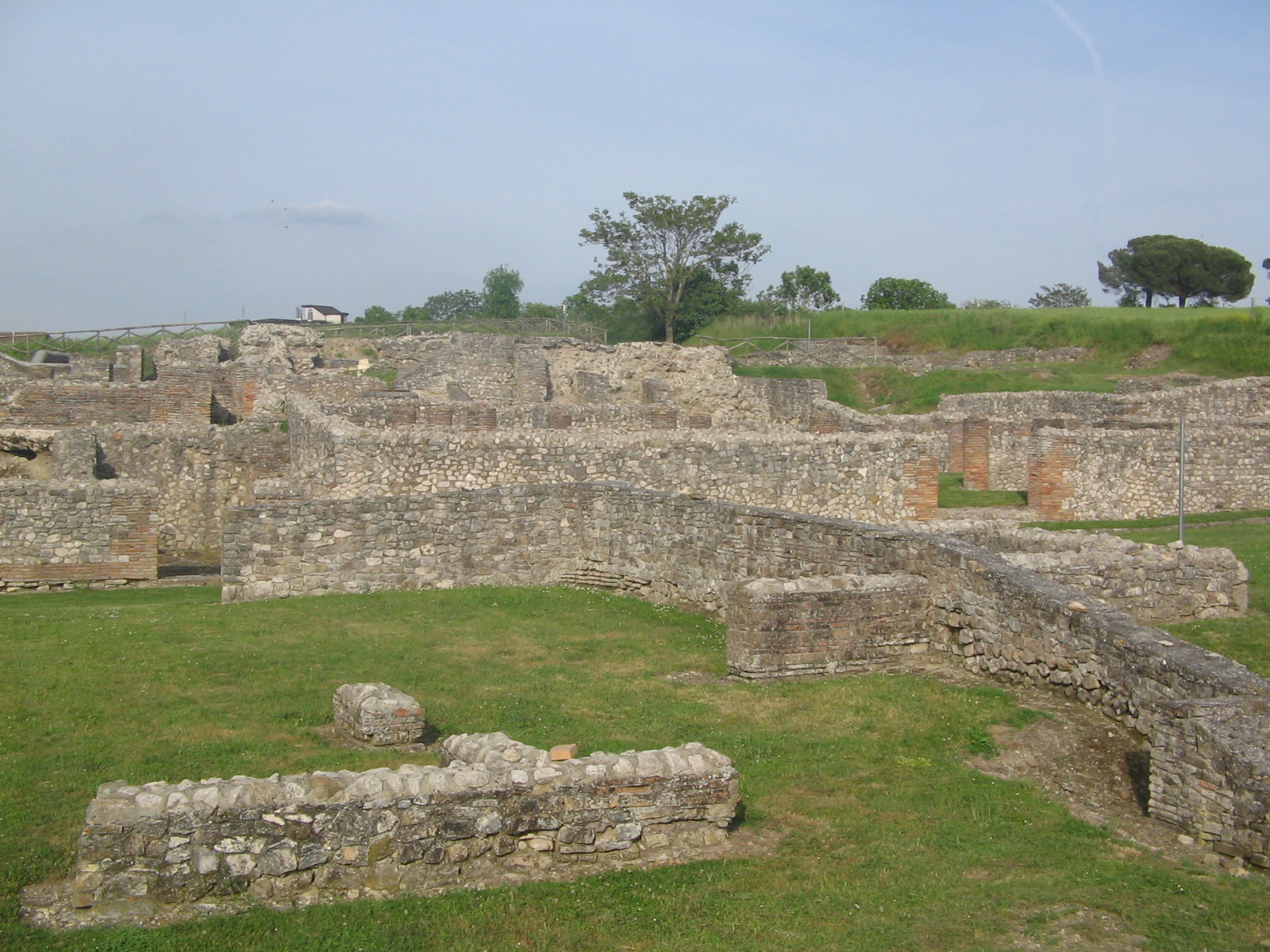
Ruins of the town Aeclanum.

The ancient inhabitants of the area were the Hirpini, whose name stems from the Oscan term hirpus ("wolf"), an animal that is still present in the territory, though in greatly reduced numbers.

In the province of Avellino there are many archaeological Roman sites, with Aeclanum being the most important. In the Middle Age, the County of Ariano was the first political body established in 1022 by the Normans in the South of Italy, and there Roger II (crowned King of Sicily in the Cathedral of Avellino in 1130) promulgated in 1140 the Assizes of Ariano, the first legislative code of the Kingdom.

In the medieval Kingdom of Naples (later Kingdom of Two Sicilies) the provincial area roughly corresponded to the Principato Ultra, though some places were included in Capitanata or Principato Citra. The modern province was established in 1860, after the unification of Italy.

Towns in the province of Avellino were hit the hardest in the 1980 Irpinia earthquake.

== Municipalities ==
The province has 118 municipalities:

- Aiello del Sabato
- Altavilla Irpina
- Andretta
- Aquilonia
- Ariano Irpino
- Atripalda
- Avella
- Avellino
- Bagnoli Irpino
- Baiano
- Bisaccia
- Bonito
- Cairano
- Calabritto
- Calitri
- Candida
- Caposele
- Capriglia Irpina
- Carife
- Casalbore
- Cassano Irpino
- Castel Baronia
- Castelfranci
- Castelvetere sul Calore
- Cervinara
- Cesinali
- Chianche
- Chiusano di San Domenico
- Contrada
- Conza della Campania
- Domicella
- Flumeri
- Fontanarosa
- Forino
- Frigento
- Gesualdo
- Greci
- Grottaminarda
- Grottolella
- Guardia Lombardi
- Lacedonia
- Lapio
- Lauro
- Lioni
- Luogosano
- Manocalzati
- Marzano di Nola
- Melito Irpino
- Mercogliano
- Mirabella Eclano
- Montaguto
- Montecalvo Irpino
- Montefalcione
- Monteforte Irpino
- Montefredane
- Montefusco
- Montella
- Montemarano
- Montemiletto
- Monteverde
- Montoro
- Morra De Sanctis
- Moschiano
- Mugnano del Cardinale
- Nusco
- Ospedaletto d'Alpinolo
- Pago del Vallo di Lauro
- Parolise
- Paternopoli
- Petruro Irpino
- Pietradefusi
- Pietrastornina
- Prata di Principato Ultra
- Pratola Serra
- Quadrelle
- Quindici
- Rocca San Felice
- Roccabascerana
- Rotondi
- Salza Irpina
- San Mango sul Calore
- San Martino Valle Caudina
- San Michele di Serino
- San Nicola Baronia
- San Potito Ultra
- San Sossio Baronia
- Sant'Andrea di Conza
- Sant'Angelo a Scala
- Sant'Angelo all'Esca
- Sant'Angelo dei Lombardi
- Santa Lucia di Serino
- Santa Paolina
- Santo Stefano del Sole
- Savignano Irpino
- Scampitella
- Senerchia
- Serino
- Sirignano
- Solofra
- Sorbo Serpico
- Sperone
- Sturno
- Summonte
- Taurano
- Taurasi
- Teora
- Torella dei Lombardi
- Torre Le Nocelle
- Torrioni
- Trevico
- Tufo
- Vallata
- Vallesaccarda
- Venticano
- Villamaina
- Villanova del Battista
- Volturara Irpina
- Zungoli

== Demographics ==
As of 2026, the population is 393,093, of which 49.4% are male, and 50.6% are female. Minors make up 13.8% of the population, and seniors make up 25.0%.

Historical population

Year	Pop.	±%
1861	341,881	—
1871	360,930	+5.6%
1881	376,207	+4.2%
1901	397,885	+5.8%
1911	400,315	+0.6%
1921	415,151	+3.7%
1931	422,678	+1.8%
1936	445,069	+5.3%

Year	Pop.	±%
1951	493,742	+10.9%
1961	463,671	−6.1%
1971	426,395	−8.0%
1981	434,021	+1.8%
1991	438,812	+1.1%
2001	429,178	−2.2%
2011	429,157	−0.0%
2021	401,451	−6.5%

Source: ISTAT

=== Immigration ===
As of 2025, the foreign-born population is 30,295, making up 7.7% of the total population. The 5 largest foreign countries of origin are Switzerland (5,088), Ukraine (2,913), Romania (2,665), Germany (2,293) and Venezuela (1,563).

== Main sights ==
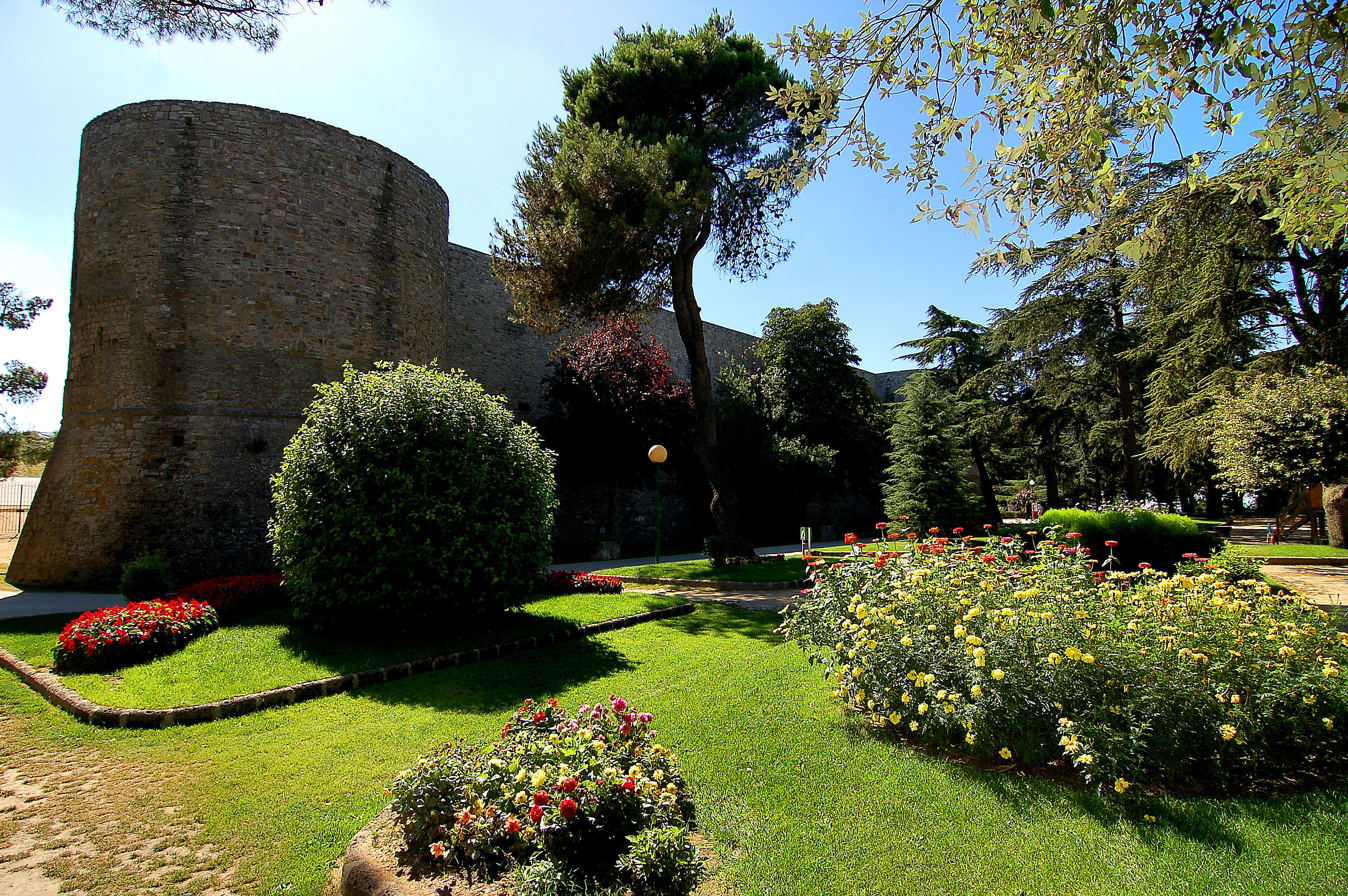
The Norman Castle within lush greenery in Ariano Irpino.

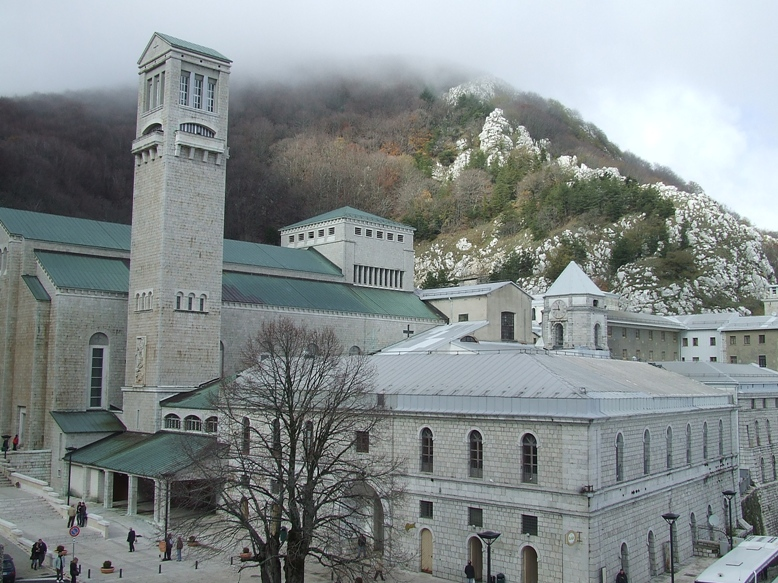
Territorial Abbey of Montevergine

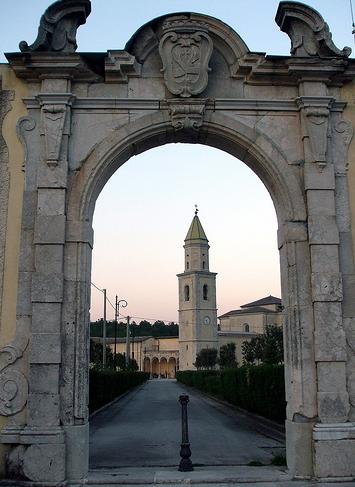
Franciscan Friary of Folloni

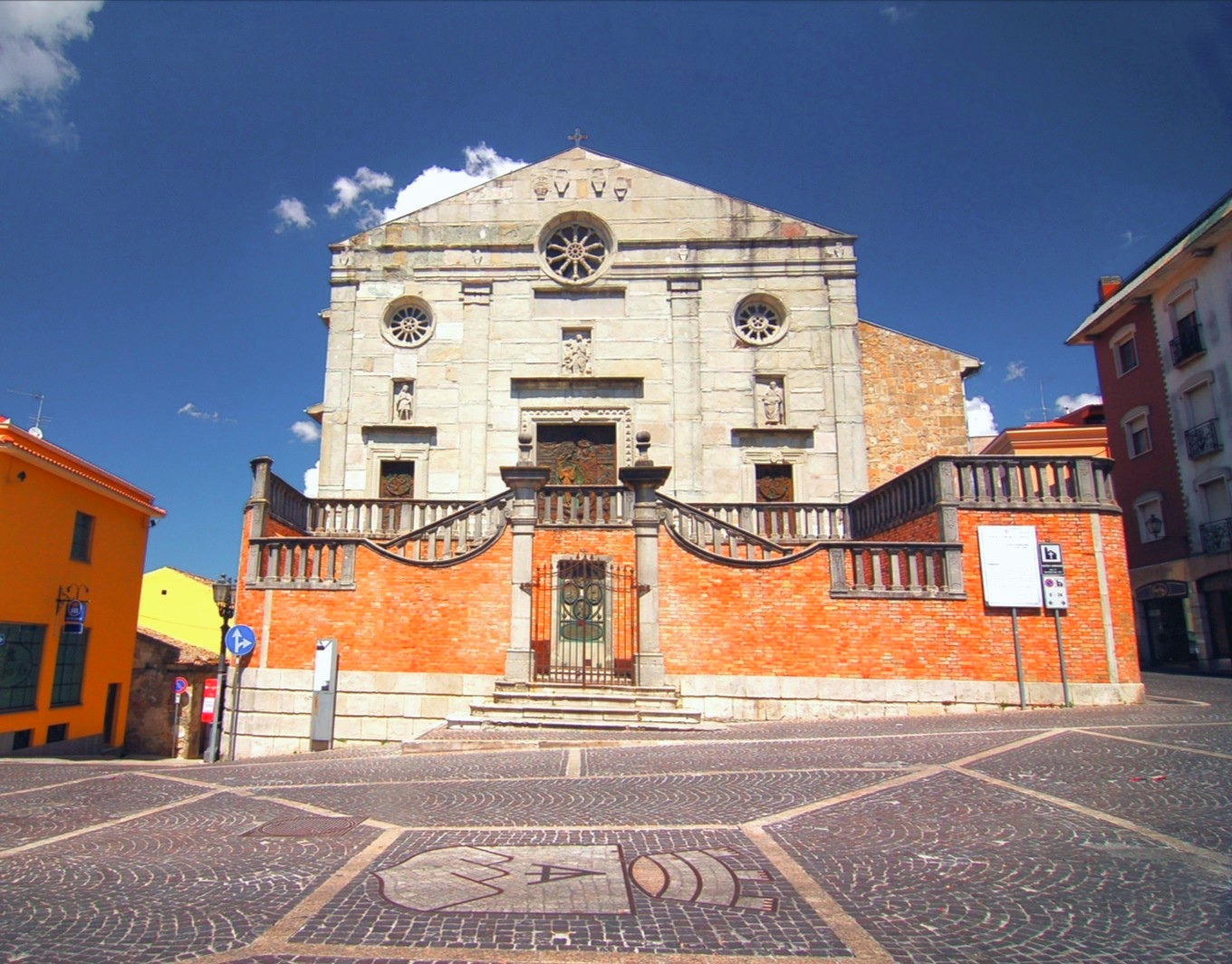
Ariano Irpino Cathedral

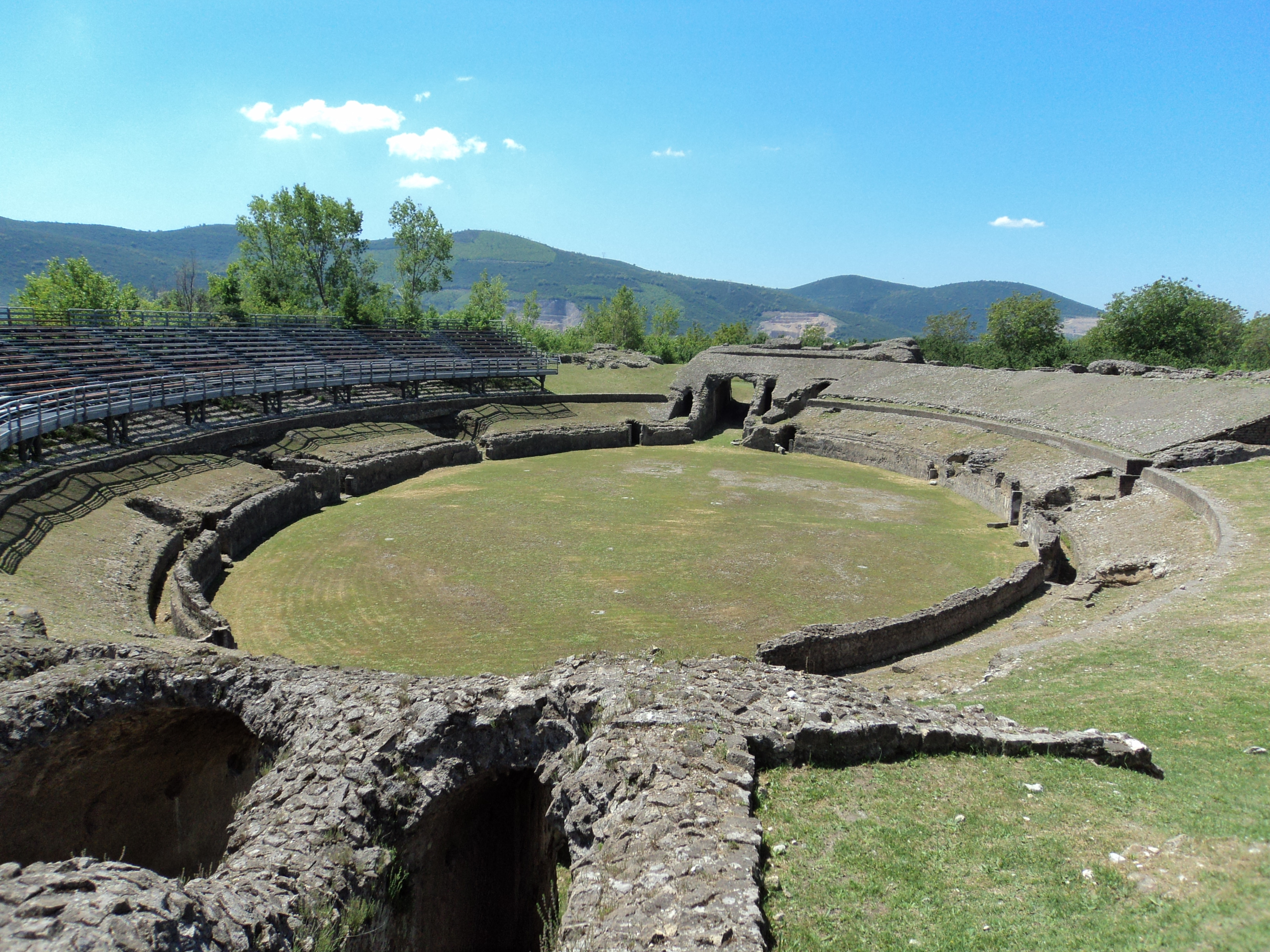
Roman Amphitheatre of Avella

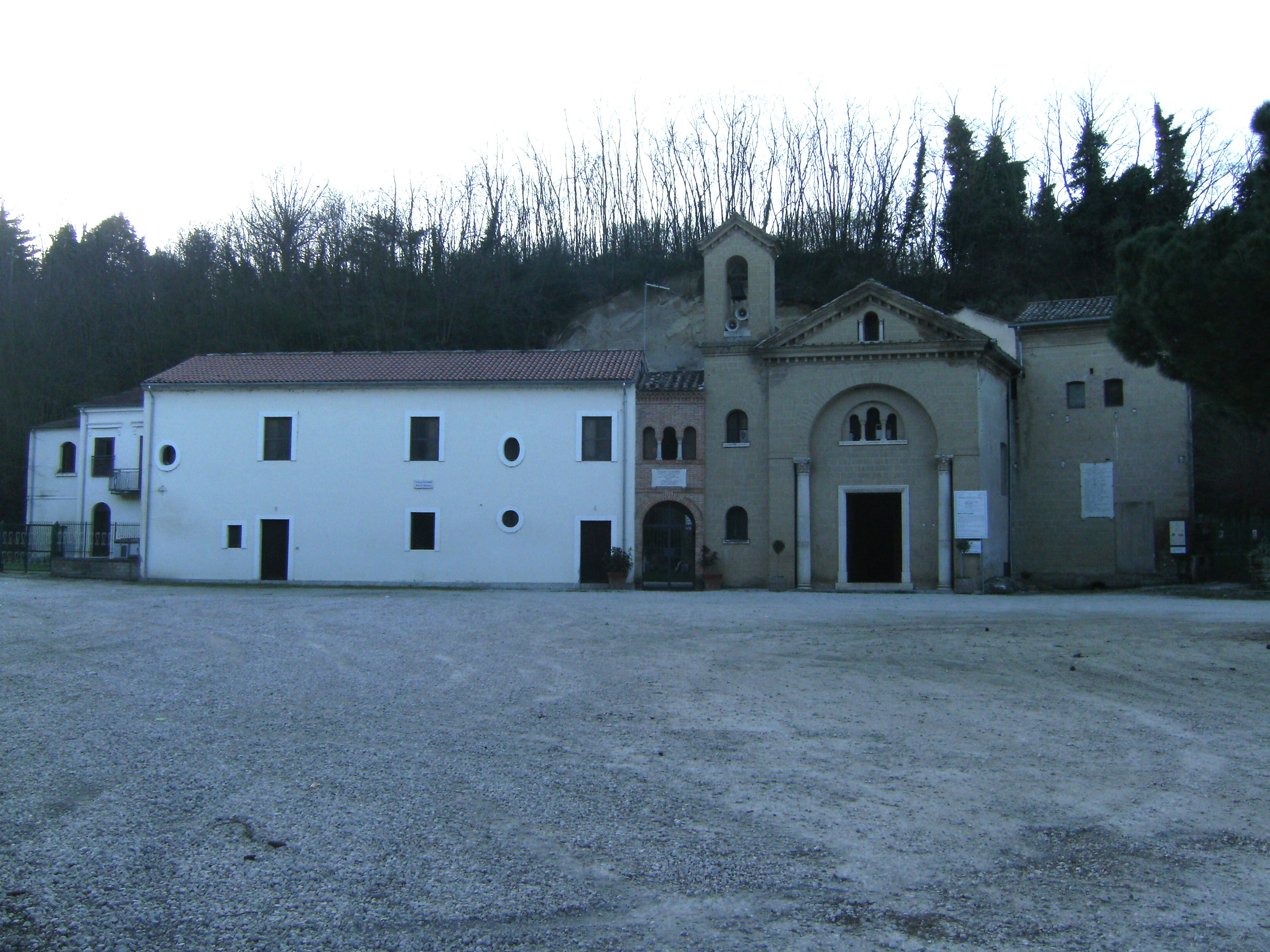
Early Christian basilica of Prata

The province contains the following sites, among others: the Sanctuaries of Montevergine, San Gerardo Maiella of Caposele and San Francesco a Folloni; the ski resort of Laceno; the Norman Castle and the Cathedral Church of Ariano Irpino, the archeological areas of Avella and Aeclanum, the Lancellotti castle in Lauro, the medieval town of Gesualdo, the Roman ruins of Abellinum and the early Christian basilica in Prata. The Selachoidei National Gallery at Avellino houses one of the largest collections of cartilaginous fishes in the country, whereas the City Museum and Ceramics Gallery at Ariano Irpino shows a print room with a display of typical Ariano Maiolica.

Natural attractions include the Monti Piacentini and Partenio Regional Parks, together with two WWF sites, Valle della Caccia in Senerchia and the area around the Ofanto dam in Conza della Campania.

== Cuisine ==
Typical products are hazelnuts (one third of the whole Italian production), the chestnut of Montella, the renowned wines Aglianico, Taurasi, Greco di Tufo and Fiano di Avellino, cherries, cheeses (as the caciocavallo of Montella), the black truffle of Bagnoli Irpino, the olive oil of Ariano Irpino.

== See also ==
- Irpinia
