= Pago del Vallo di Lauro =

- Comune
- Comune di Pago del Vallo di Lauro
- Location within Italy Location within Campania
- Coordinates: 40°53′50″N 14°36′27″E
- Country: Italy
- Region: Campania
- Province: Avellino (AV)
- Frazioni: Pernosano, Sopravia

Area
  - Total: 4 km^{2} (1.5 sq mi)

Population (1 May 2009)
  - Total: 1,888
  - Density: 470/km^{2} (1,200/sq mi)
- Demonym: Paghesi
- Time zone: UTC+1 (CET)
  - Summer (DST): UTC+2 (CEST)
- Postal code: 83020
- Dialing code: 081
- ISTAT code: 064068
- Patron saint: Sant'Antonio
- Saint day: 13 June

Pago del Vallo di Lauro (Campanian: Pào) is a town and comune in the province of Avellino, Campania, Italy.
