= List of municipalities of the Province of Avellino =

The following is a list of the 118 municipalities (comuni) of the Province of Avellino in the region of Campania in Italy.

== List ==
Municipality	Population (2026)	Area (km²)	Density
Aiello del Sabato	4,045	10.87	372.1
Altavilla Irpina	3,803	14.08	270.1
Andretta	1,630	43.65	37.3
Aquilonia	1,381	56.15	24.6
Ariano Irpino	20,657	186.74	110.6
Atripalda	10,182	8.59	1,185.3
Avella	7,417	29.39	252.4
Avellino	51,819	30.55	1,696.2
Bagnoli Irpino	2,990	68.81	43.5
Baiano	4,371	12.30	355.4
Bisaccia	3,424	102.16	33.5
Bonito	2,169	18.78	115.5
Cairano	281	13.81	20.3
Calabritto	2,096	56.33	37.2
Calitri	4,090	101.06	40.5
Candida	1,083	5.35	202.4
Caposele	3,185	41.28	77.2
Capriglia Irpina	2,184	7.49	291.6
Carife	1,242	16.72	74.3
Casalbore	1,514	28.09	53.9
Cassano Irpino	959	13.07	73.4
Castel Baronia	1,047	15.37	68.1
Castelfranci	1,666	11.69	142.5
Castelvetere sul Calore	1,454	17.17	84.7
Cervinara	8,718	29.34	297.1
Cesinali	2,512	3.73	673.5
Chianche	458	6.61	69.3
Chiusano di San Domenico	2,055	24.60	83.5
Contrada	3,087	10.31	299.4
Conza della Campania	1,269	51.64	24.6
Domicella	1,794	6.40	280.3
Flumeri	2,462	34.55	71.3
Fontanarosa	2,832	16.70	169.6
Forino	5,218	20.39	255.9
Frigento	3,396	38.04	89.3
Gesualdo	3,194	27.34	116.8
Greci	594	30.27	19.6
Grottaminarda	7,564	29.12	259.8
Grottolella	1,811	7.13	254.0
Guardia Lombardi	1,446	55.87	25.9
Lacedonia	2,011	82.10	24.5
Lapio	1,421	15.25	93.2
Lauro	3,243	11.29	287.2
Lioni	5,862	46.51	126.0
Luogosano	1,062	6.07	175.0
Manocalzati	2,991	8.75	341.8
Marzano di Nola	1,656	4.72	350.8
Melito Irpino	1,759	20.68	85.1
Mercogliano	11,416	19.92	573.1
Mirabella Eclano	6,546	33.96	192.8
Montaguto	333	18.38	18.1
Montecalvo Irpino	3,226	54.01	59.7
Montefalcione	3,042	15.29	199.0
Monteforte Irpino	11,352	26.96	421.1
Montefredane	2,153	9.45	227.8
Montefusco	1,183	8.24	143.6
Montella	7,137	82.96	86.0
Montemarano	2,520	34.01	74.1
Montemiletto	5,013	21.64	231.7
Monteverde	660	39.58	16.7
Montoro	19,513	40.14	486.1
Morra De Sanctis	1,083	30.41	35.6
Moschiano	1,535	13.45	114.1
Mugnano del Cardinale	5,115	12.30	415.9
Nusco	3,783	53.60	70.6
Ospedaletto d'Alpinolo	1,963	5.68	345.6
Pago del Vallo di Lauro	1,684	4.63	363.7
Parolise	612	3.22	190.1
Paternopoli	2,068	18.43	112.2
Petruro Irpino	297	3.14	94.6
Pietradefusi	1,919	9.24	207.7
Pietrastornina	1,463	15.73	93.0
Prata di Principato Ultra	2,655	10.99	241.6
Pratola Serra	3,561	8.84	402.8
Quadrelle	1,864	6.93	269.0
Quindici	1,757	23.91	73.5
Rocca San Felice	765	14.41	53.1
Roccabascerana	2,343	12.46	188.0
Rotondi	3,329	7.81	426.2
Salza Irpina	727	4.96	146.6
San Mango sul Calore	1,104	14.59	75.7
San Martino Valle Caudina	4,733	22.92	206.5
San Michele di Serino	2,391	4.47	534.9
San Nicola Baronia	737	6.90	106.8
San Potito Ultra	1,457	4.54	320.9
San Sossio Baronia	1,462	19.19	76.2
Sant'Andrea di Conza	1,341	7.05	190.2
Sant'Angelo a Scala	672	10.75	62.5
Sant'Angelo all'Esca	688	5.46	126.0
Sant'Angelo dei Lombardi	3,783	55.11	68.6
Santa Lucia di Serino	1,342	3.93	341.5
Santa Paolina	1,125	8.43	133.5
Santo Stefano del Sole	2,046	10.78	189.8
Savignano Irpino	1,010	38.47	26.3
Scampitella	981	15.11	64.9
Senerchia	708	32.03	22.1
Serino	6,563	52.50	125.0
Sirignano	2,941	6.19	475.1
Solofra	11,921	22.21	536.7
Sorbo Serpico	512	8.10	63.2
Sperone	3,627	4.70	771.7
Sturno	2,704	16.67	162.2
Summonte	1,469	12.37	118.8
Taurano	1,405	9.77	143.8
Taurasi	2,056	14.41	142.7
Teora	1,424	23.21	61.4
Torella dei Lombardi	1,945	26.57	73.2
Torre Le Nocelle	1,223	10.04	121.8
Torrioni	461	4.22	109.2
Trevico	789	11.00	71.7
Tufo	757	5.96	127.0
Vallata	2,405	47.91	50.2
Vallesaccarda	1,195	14.13	84.6
Venticano	2,284	14.16	161.3
Villamaina	896	9.04	99.1
Villanova del Battista	1,439	20.00	72.0
Volturara Irpina	2,878	32.42	88.8
Zungoli	898	19.22	46.7

== See also ==
- List of municipalities of Campania
- List of municipalities of Italy
