= Agostino Folignatti =

Roman Catholic bishop (died 1579)

Most Reverend Agostino Folignatti
- Bishop of Bertinoro
- Church: Catholic Church
- Diocese: Diocese of Trevico
- In office: 1564–1579
- Predecessor: Egidio Falcetta de Cingulo
- Successor: Benedetto Oliva

Personal details
- Died: 1579 Trevico, Italy

Agostino Folignatti or Agostino Molignatus (died 1579) was a Roman Catholic prelate who served as Bishop of Bertinoro (1564–1579) and Bishop of Trevico (1562–1564).

== Biography ==
On 27 May 1562, Agostino Folignatti was appointed during the papacy of Pope Pius IV as Bishop of Trevico. On 28 July 1564, Agostino Folignatti was appointed during the papacy of Pope Pius IV as Bishop of Bertinoro. He served as Bishop of Bertinoro until his death in 1579.

== External links and additional sources ==
- Cheney, David M. "Diocese of Trevico". Catholic-Hierarchy.org. (non-Latin listing of Chronology of Bishops) ^{[self-published]}
- Chow, Gabriel. "Titular Episcopal See of Trevico". GCatholic.org. (non-Latin listing of Chronology of Bishops) ^{[self-published]}
- Cheney, David M. "Diocese of Bertinoro". Catholic-Hierarchy.org. (non-Latin listing of Chronology of Bishops) ^{[self-published]}
- Chow, Gabriel. "Diocese of Bertinoro". GCatholic.org. (non-Latin listing of Chronology of Bishops) ^{[self-published]}

Catholic Church titles
Preceded by Francesco de Leo	Bishop of Trevico; 1564–1575	Succeeded by Gerolamo Politi
Preceded by Egidio Falcetta de Cingulo	Bishop of Bertinoro; 1564–1579	Succeeded by Giovanni Andrea Caligari
