= Giacomo Torrella =

Most Reverend Giacomo Torrella
- Bishop of Trevico
- Church: Catholic Church
- Diocese: Diocese of Trevico
- In office: 1497–1521
- Successor: Sixtus Signati

Personal details
- Died: 1521 Trevico, Italy

Giacomo Torrella (died 1521) was a Roman Catholic prelate who served as Bishop of Trevico (1497–1521).

On 27 October 1497, Giacomo Torrella was appointed during the papacy of Pope Alexander VI as Bishop of Trevico. He served as Bishop of Trevico until his death in 1521.

== External links and additional sources ==
- Cheney, David M. "Diocese of Trevico". Catholic-Hierarchy.org. (for the Chronology of Bishops using non-Latin names) ^{[self-published]}
- Chow, Gabriel. "Titular Episcopal See of Trevico". GCatholic.org. (for the Chronology of Bishops using non-Latin names) ^{[self-published]}

Catholic Church titles
Preceded by	Bishop of Trevico; 1497–1521	Succeeded by Sixtus Signati
