= Alfonso Pardo =

Most Reverend Alfonso Pardo
- Bishop of Trevico
- Church: Catholic Church
- Diocese: Diocese of Trevico
- In office: 1580–1603
- Predecessor: Antonio Balducci
- Successor: Gregorio Servanzi

Personal details
- Died: 1603 Trevico, Italy

Alfonso Pardo (died 1603) was a Roman Catholic prelate who served as Bishop of Trevico (1580–1603).

== Biography ==
On 22 June 1580, Alfonso Pardo was appointed during the papacy of Pope Gregory XIII as Bishop of Trevico. He served as Bishop of Trevico until his death in 1603.

== External links and additional sources ==
- Cheney, David M. "Diocese of Trevico". Catholic-Hierarchy.org. (for the Chronology of Bishops using non-Latin names) ^{[self-published]}
- Chow, Gabriel. "Titular Episcopal See of Trevico". GCatholic.org. (for the Chronology of Bishops using non-Latin names) ^{[self-published]}

Catholic Church titles
Preceded by Antonio Balducci	Bishop of Trevico; 1580–1603	Succeeded by Gregorio Servanzi
