= Roman Catholic Diocese of Trevico =

The Diocese of Trevico (Latin: Dioecesis Trevicensis) was a Roman Catholic diocese located in the town of Trevico in the province of Avellino, Campania, southern Italy. In 1818, it was suppressed to the Diocese of Lacedonia.

== History ==
10th Century Established as Diocese of Trevico
1818 June 27: Suppressed to Diocese of Lacedonia
1968: Restored as Titular Episcopal See of Trevico

== Ordinaries ==
=== Diocese of Trevico ===
- Giacomo Torrella (27 Oct 1497 - 1521 Died)
- Sixtus Signati (10 May 1521 - 1540 Died)
- Sebastiano Graziani (19 Jan 1541 - 1548 Resigned)
- Francesco de Leo (13 Jul 1548 - 1562 Died)
- Agostino Folignatti (Molignatus) (27 May 1562 - 28 Jul 1564 Appointed, Bishop of Bertinoro)
- Gerolamo Politi, O.P. (25 Oct 1564 - 1575 Died)
- Benedetto Oliva (2 Sep 1575 - 13 Jan 1576 Died)
- Antonio Balducci, O.P. (6 Feb 1576 - 1580 Died)
- Alfonso Pardo (22 Jun 1580 - 1603 Died)
- Gregorio Servanzi, O.P. (19 Dec 1603 - 1607 Resigned)
- Gerolamo Mezzamico (10 Dec 1607 - 1636 Died)
- Orazio Muscettola (7 Apr 1636 - 1638 Died)
- Fabio Magnesi (19 Apr 1638 - 9 Jan 1640 Appointed, Bishop of Ostuni)
- Silvestro D'Afflitto, C.R. (16 Jan 1640 - 23 Feb 1643 Appointed, Bishop of Lucera)
- Alessandro Salzilla (13 Apr 1643 - 12 May 1646 Appointed, Bishop of Sant'Angelo dei Lombardi e Bisaccia)
- Donato Pascasio, O.S.B. (9 Apr 1646 - 13 Feb 1664 Died)
- Marco Vaccina (15 Sep 1664 - 26 Aug 1671 Died)
- Luca Tisbia, C.R. (16 Nov 1671 - 25 Apr 1693 Died)
- Francesco Protonobilissimo (24 Aug 1693 - 1 Jul 1701 Died)
- Simeone Veglini (11 Dec 1702 - 4 Mar 1720 Appointed, Bishop of Tricarico)
- Domenico Filomarini, C.R. (15 Apr 1720 - Jan 1733 Died)
- Francesco Antonio Leonardis (11 May 1733 - 15 Jul 1739 Appointed, Bishop of Bisceglie)
- Bernardo Onorato Buonocore (15 Jul 1739 - 31 Dec 1773 Died)
- Giuseppe Pasquale Rogani (9 May 1774 - 21 Jun 1791 Died)
- Agostino Gregorio Golini (27 Feb 1792 Confirmed - 1813 Died)

1818 June 27: Suppressed to the Diocese of Lacedonia
