= Antonio Balducci =

Most Reverend Antonio Balducci
- Bishop of Trevico
- Church: Catholic Church
- Diocese: Diocese of Trevico
- In office: 1576–1580
- Predecessor: Benedetto Oliva
- Successor: Alfonso Pardo

Personal details
- Died: 1580 Trevico, Italy

Antonio Balducci, O.P. (died 1580) was a Roman Catholic prelate who served as Bishop of Trevico (1576–1580).

== Biography ==
Antonio Balducci was ordained a priest in the Order of Preachers (Dominicans). In 1570 he served as Inquisitor in Bologna and handled the trial of Geralomo Cardano. On 6 February 1576, during the papacy of Pope Gregory XIII, he was appointed as Bishop of Trevico. He served as Bishop of Trevico until his death in 1580.

== External links and additional sources ==
- Cheney, David M. "Diocese of Trevico". Catholic-Hierarchy.org. (for the Chronology of Bishops using non-Latin names) ^{[self-published]}
- Chow, Gabriel. "Titular Episcopal See of Trevico". GCatholic.org. (for the Chronology of Bishops using non-Latin names) ^{[self-published]}

Catholic Church titles
Preceded by Benedetto Oliva	Bishop of Trevico; 1576–1580	Succeeded by Alfonso Pardo
