= Francesco de Leo =

Most Reverend Francesco de Leo
- Bishop of Trevico
- Church: Catholic Church
- Diocese: Diocese of Trevico
- In office: 1548–1562
- Predecessor: Sebastiano Graziani
- Successor: Agostino Folignatti

Personal details
- Died: 1562 Trevico, Italy

Francesco de Leo (died 1562) was a Roman Catholic prelate who served as Bishop of Trevico (1548–1562).

On 13 July 1548, Francesco de Leo was appointed during the papacy of Pope Paul III as Bishop of Trevico. He served as Bishop of Trevico until his death in 1562.

== External links and additional sources ==
- Cheney, David M. "Diocese of Trevico". Catholic-Hierarchy.org. (for the Chronology of Bishops using non-Latin names) ^{[self-published]}
- Chow, Gabriel. "Titular Episcopal See of Trevico". GCatholic.org. (for the Chronology of Bishops using non-Latin names) ^{[self-published]}

Catholic Church titles
Preceded by Sebastiano Graziani	Bishop of Trevico; 1548–1562	Succeeded by Agostino Folignatti
