= Girolamo Panzetta =

Italian actor (born 1962)

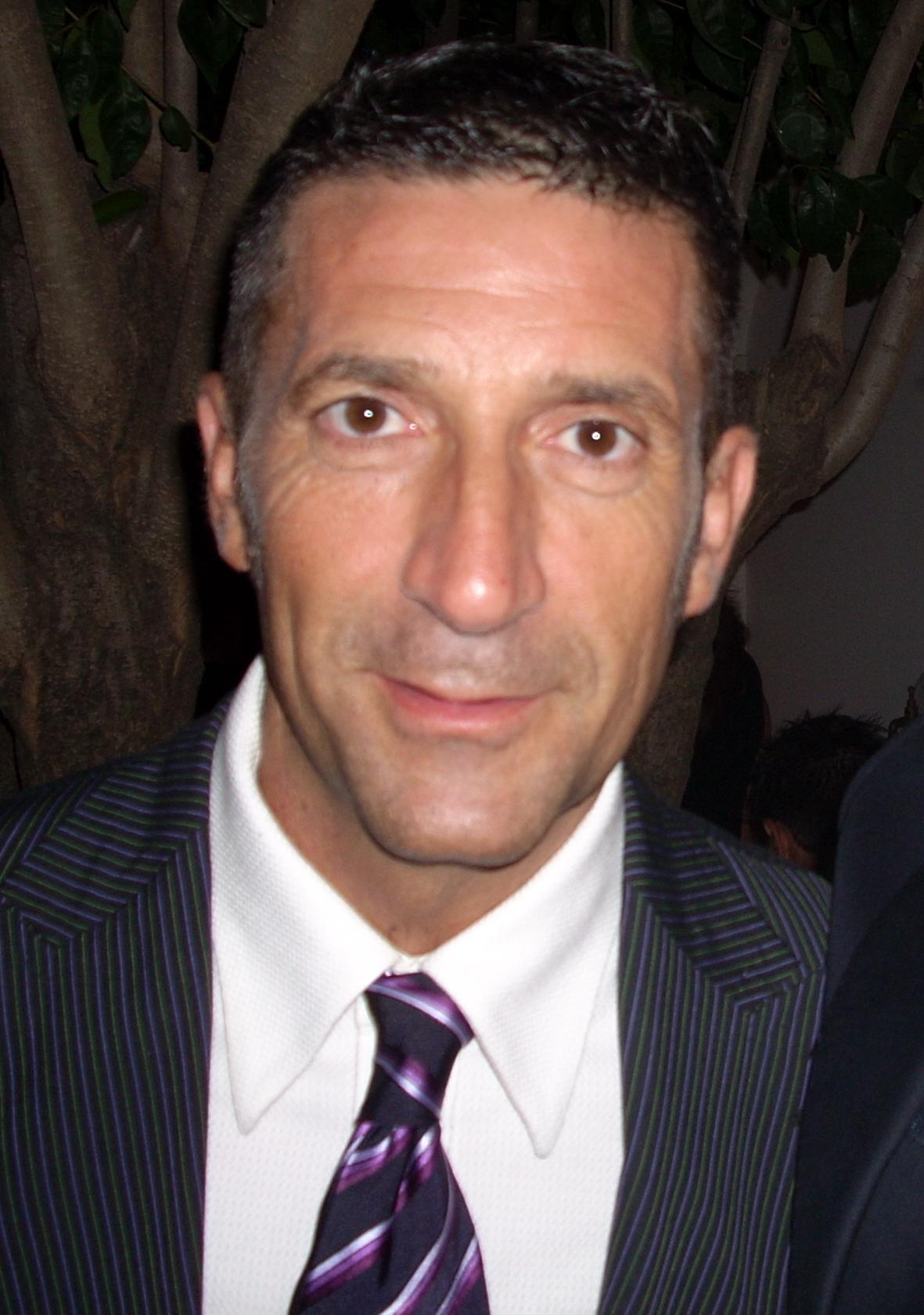
- Girolamo Panzetta in September 2007
- Born: 6 September 1962 (age 63); Villanova del Battista, Italy
- Occupations: Television show host, actor, author

Girolamo Panzetta (born 6 September 1962 in Villanova del Battista, Italy) is an Italian celebrity living and working in Japan (Gaikokujin tarento). He has appeared on Japanese television in a variety of shows, including dramas and cooking shows. He has also been featured in fashion magazines. Panzetta voiced the Italian car Luigi in the Japanese version of Cars. He is also the author of several books and essays. He appeared on over 170 front covers of every edition of Japanese men's fashion magazine LEON since its launch in September 2001.

== Filmography ==
=== Film ===
- Cherry Girl (2006)
- Lady Maiko (2014)
- Dosukoi! Sukehira (2019), Italian doctor

=== Television ===
- Iron Chef (1999) - Himself (Judge)
- Matrimonial Chaos (2013), Girolamo Panzetta

=== Japanese dub ===
- Cars (2006), Luigi
- Cars 2 (2011), Luigi
- Cars 3 (2017), Luigi
