= Flumeri =

- Comune
- Comune di Flumeri
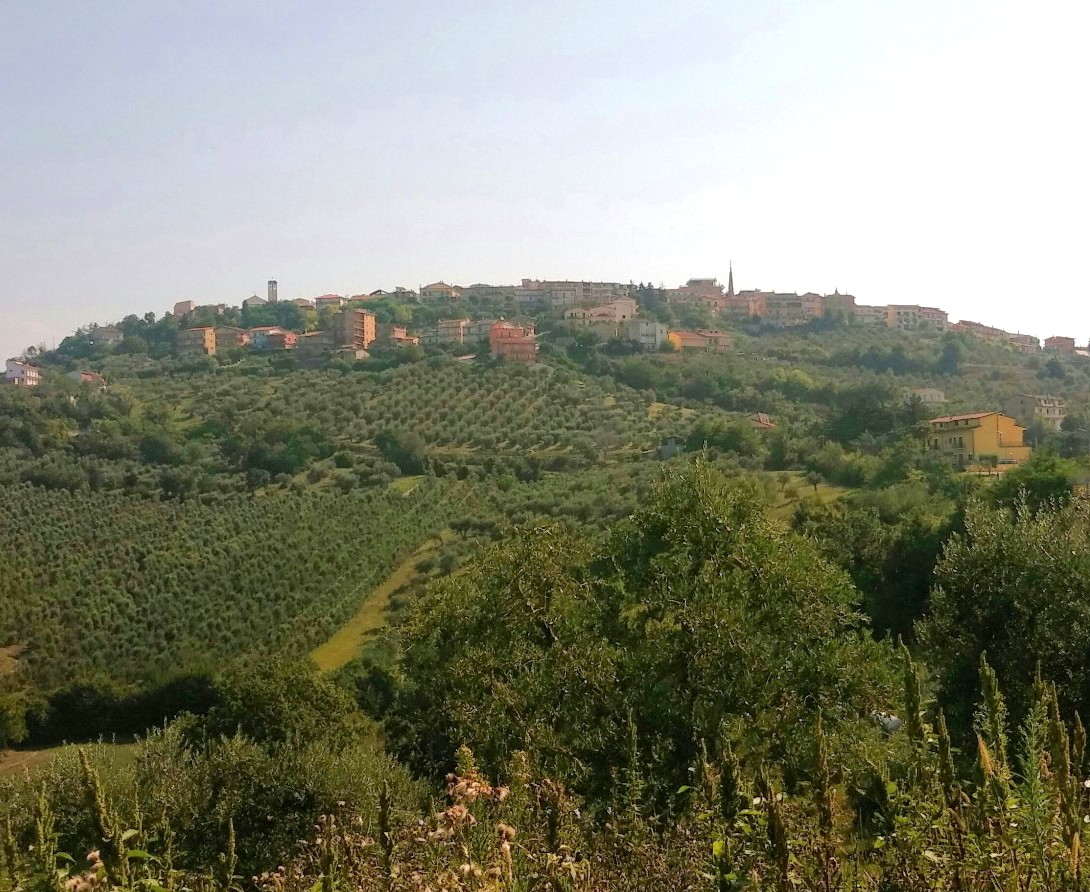

- Location within Italy Location within Campania
- Coordinates: 41°4′44″N 15°8′55″E
- Country: Italy
- Region: Campania
- Province: Avellino (AV)
- Frazioni: Arcolento, Candelaro, Corridoio, Corvarana, Difesa, Laghi-Valle, Lagni, Murge, Pastinelli, Pilone, San Pietro, San Vito, Scampata, Tierzi, Tre Torri

Government
  - Mayor: Angelo Antonio Lanza

Area
  - Total: 34.24 km^{2} (13.22 sq mi)
- Elevation: 625 m (2,051 ft)

Population (31 August 2017)
  - Total: 2,950
  - Density: 86.2/km^{2} (223/sq mi)
- Demonym: Flumeresi
- Time zone: UTC+1 (CET)
  - Summer (DST): UTC+2 (CEST)
- Postal code: 83040
- Dialing code: 0825
- Patron saint: St. Roch
- Saint day: 6 December
- Website: Official website

Flumeri (Irpino: Flùmmërë) is a town and comune in the province of Avellino, Campania, southern Italy.

Located in the Apennines upon a knoll within the Ufita Valley, the town is part of the Roman Catholic Diocese of Ariano Irpino-Lacedonia. Its territory borders with the municipalities of Ariano Irpino, Castel Baronia, Frigento, Grottaminarda, San Nicola Baronia, San Sossio Baronia, Sturno, Villanova del Battista and Zungoli.
