= Sixtus Signati =

Most Reverend Sixtus Signati
- Bishop of Trevico
- Church: Catholic Church
- Diocese: Diocese of Trevico
- In office: 1521–1540
- Predecessor: Giacomo Torrella
- Successor: Sebastiano Graziani

Personal details
- Died: 1540 Trevico, Italy

Sixtus Signati (died 1540) was a Roman Catholic prelate who served as Bishop of Trevico (1521–1540).

On 10 May 1521, Sixtus Signati was appointed during the papacy of Pope Leo X as Bishop of Trevico. He served as Bishop of Trevico until his death in 1540.

== External links and additional sources ==
- Cheney, David M. "Diocese of Trevico". Catholic-Hierarchy.org. (for the Chronology of Bishops using non-Latin names) ^{[self-published]}
- Chow, Gabriel. "Titular Episcopal See of Trevico". GCatholic.org. (for the Chronology of Bishops using non-Latin names) ^{[self-published]}

Catholic Church titles
Preceded by Giacomo Torrella	Bishop of Trevico; 1521–1540	Succeeded by Sebastiano Graziani
