= Carife =

- Comune
- Comune di Carife
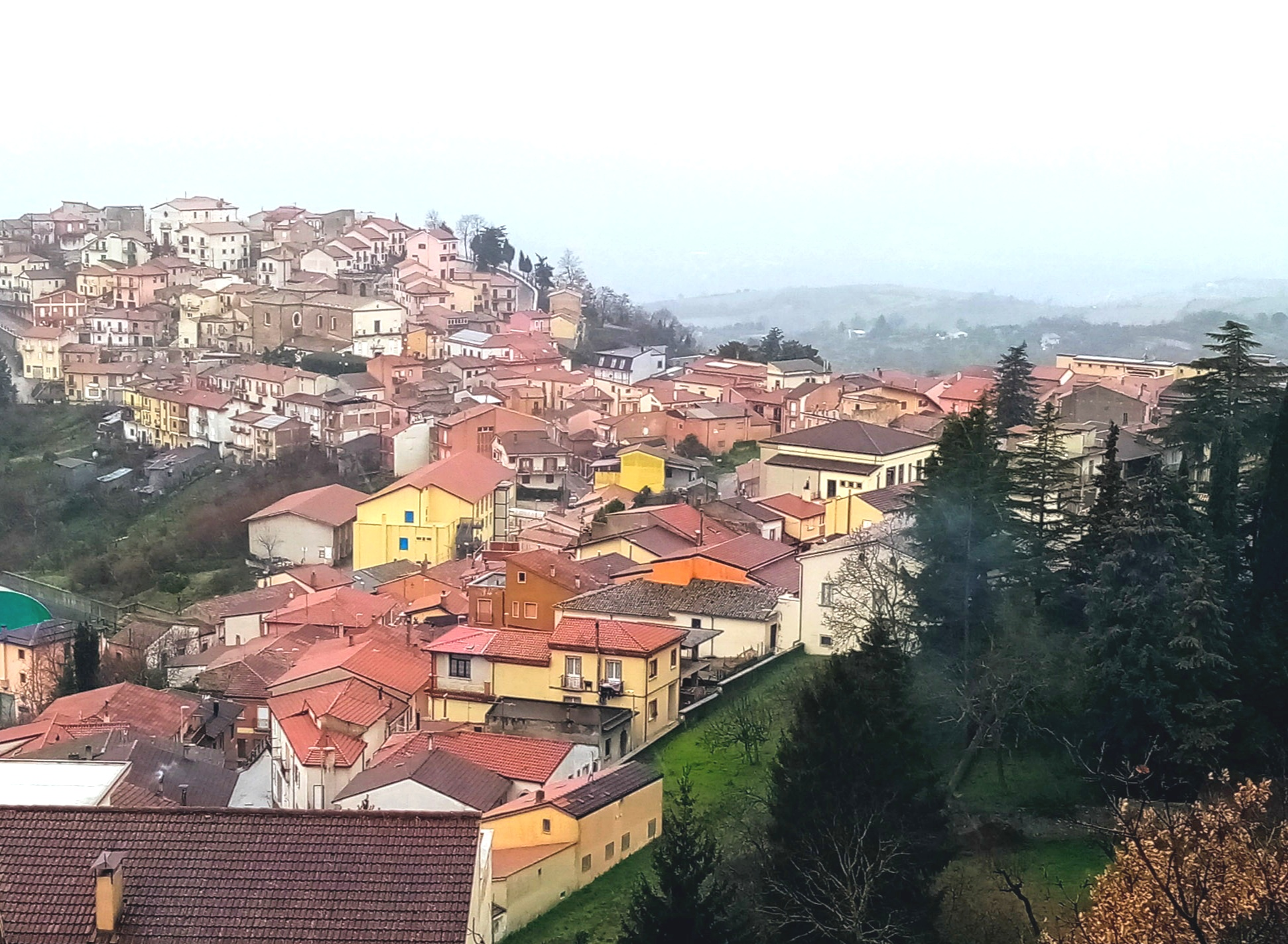

- Coat of arms

- Location within Italy Location within Campania
- Coordinates: 41°1′38″N 15°12′35″E
- Country: Italy
- Region: Campania
- Province: Avellino (AV)
- Frazioni: Ariacchino, Ciaruolo, Piano Lagnetta, San Martino, Santo Leo, Serra Di Fusco, Fiumara

Government
  - Mayor: Carmine Di Giorgio

Area
  - Total: 16.62 km^{2} (6.42 sq mi)
- Elevation: 740 m (2,430 ft)

Population (31 May 2017)
  - Total: 1,396
  - Density: 84.00/km^{2} (217.5/sq mi)
- Demonym: Carifani
- Time zone: UTC+1 (CET)
  - Summer (DST): UTC+2 (CEST)
- Postal code: 83040
- Dialing code: 0827
- ISTAT code: 064019
- Patron saint: San Giovanni Battista
- Saint day: 24 June
- Website: Official website

Carife (Latin: Callifae; Irpino: Carìfë) is a town and comune in the province of Avellino, Campania, Italy. In the year 2001, the population was 1,697.

Located in the Apennines between the Ufita Valley and Daunian Mountains, the town is part of the Roman Catholic Diocese of Ariano Irpino-Lacedonia. Its territory borders the municipalities of Castel Baronia, Frigento, Guardia Lombardi, San Nicola Baronia, Sturno, Trevico and Vallata.
