= Vincent DeMarco =

American public health advocate

Vinny DeMarco
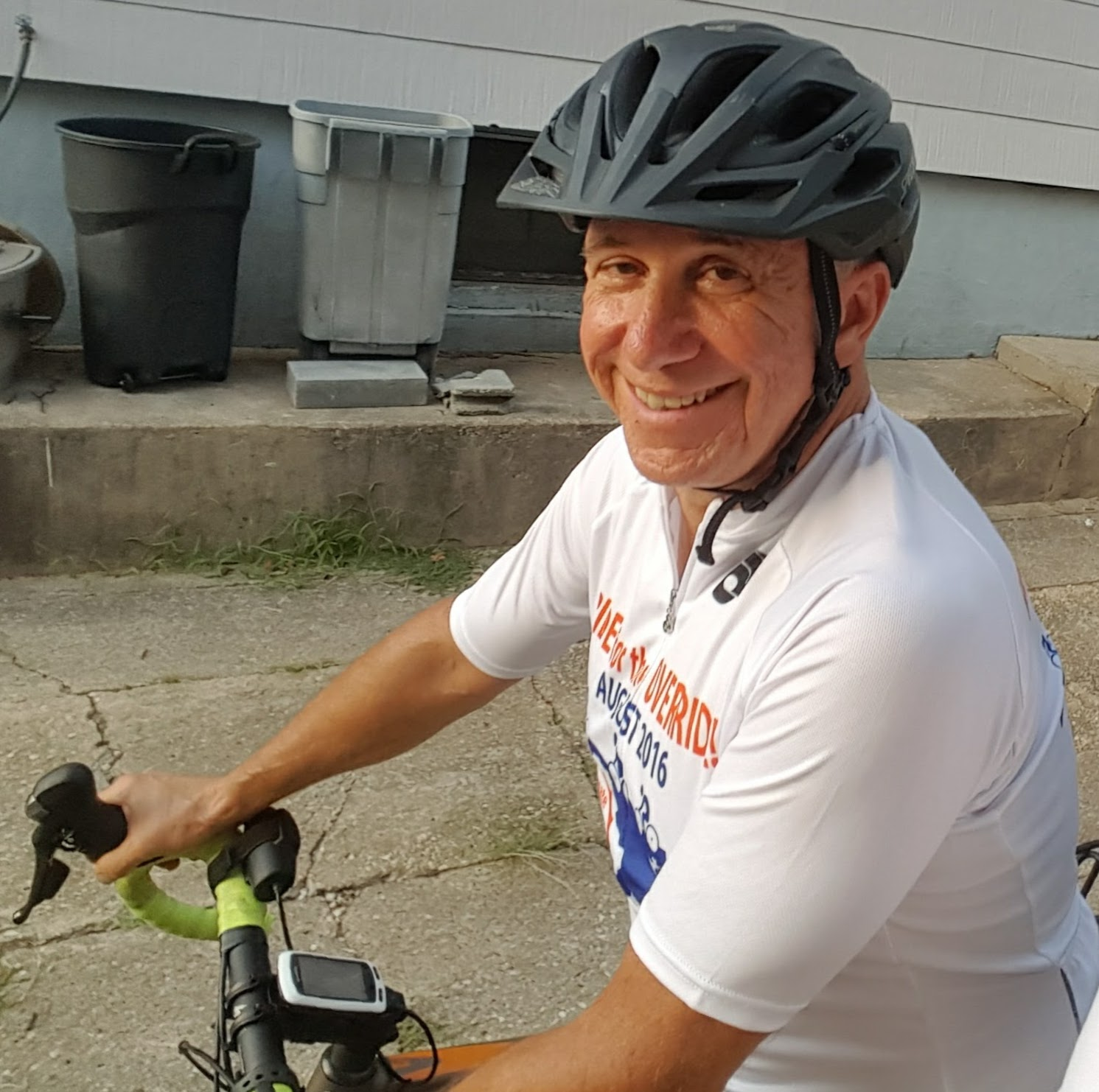
- Vinny DeMarco beginning the 2015 Ride For The Override.
- Born: 1957 (age 67–68); Trevico, Italy
- Education: Johns Hopkins University
- Spouse: Molly Mitchell (m. 1987)
- Children: 2

Vincent DeMarco (born 1957 in Trevico) is an American public health advocate. He is the President of the Maryland Citizens' Health Initiative. He is the subject of a 2010 book by Michael Pertschuk entitled The DeMarco Factor: Transforming Public Will Into Political Power. DeMarco is an adjunct assistant professor at the Johns Hopkins Bloomberg School of Public Health, where he teaches students strategies for advocating public health policies.

== Early life ==
Vincent DeMarco was born in 1957 in Trevico, Italy, to Rosa and Antonio DeMarco. In 1961, they immigrated to New Jersey. He has a brother Nicola and sisters Brunella and Marlana. He graduated from high school in Hazlet, New Jersey, in 1973. Attending Johns Hopkins University for undergraduate and graduate work in American history, he was on the college debate team, volunteered in support of a labor boycott, and successfully lobbied for banning "walking around" money in Maryland political campaigns.

In 1982, he worked with Young Democrats for nuclear freeze. In 1986, he campaigned for Steve Sachs for Governor of Maryland. After earning his Juris Doctor degree, he worked for Lt. Governor Kathleen Kennedy Townsend. In 1987 he married Molly Mitchell in a Quaker service. They have two sons, Tony and Jamie.

== Health initiatives ==
At the end of 1999, DeMarco helped organize the Maryland Citizens' Health Initiative, later renamed to Maryland Health Care for All!. In 2001, this group held town meetings and 2002 allied in support of a further cigarette tax increase to support health care. Rallying through the 2002 defeat of Kathleen Kennedy Townsend by Republican Robert Ehrlich, the group saw their efforts reach fruition in the January 2006 veto override of the Fair Share Bill, which forced Walmart and other employers to increase health care for its workers. In 2005, DeMarco was praised by The Baltimore Sun's C. Fraser Smith, and the Washington Post's Matthew Mosk and John Wagner.

DeMarco's successful advocacy has been attributed to his six-step program for enacting legislation.

On November 19, 2007, Maryland committed $280 million to the expansion of the state's health care system.

In 2011, DeMarco worked with partners to advocate for a sales tax on acoholic beverages in Maryland.

On June 19, 2020, DeMarco was awarded the Andy Hyman Award for Advocacy. The award pays tribute to nonprofit leaders who embody a commitment to principled action, passionate leadership to advance social change, and dedication to making progress in policy and practice despite challenging political environments.

== Handgun initiatives ==
In 1988, DeMarco opposed a voter referendum by the National Rifle Association of America. In 1988, the Saturday night special Ban law that he had drafted was passed by referendum in Maryland. The Baltimore Sun editorialized him as Marylander of the Year on December 31, 1988. Working from 1994 to 1996, DeMarco campaigned for the One Handgun Per Month Law, which passed in 1996. In 1997, DeMarco worked with Handgun Control, Inc. in Washington, DC, which was later renamed The Brady Campaign.

== Tobacco initiatives ==
In 1997, he joined the Smoke Free Maryland campaign and unveiled the Maryland Children's Initiative. Leading up to the state elections on November 3, 1998, they collected pledges of support from candidates, and on March 26, 1999, a $1.00-per-pack tax increase passed the Maryland House. On April 10, 1999, the Senate passed this bill, with the increase scaled back to 30 cents per pack. A year later, on August 26, 2000, The Baltimore Sun reported that 60 million fewer packs had sold that year.

=== Federal tobacco efforts ===
In 2001, DeMarco consulted to the Tobacco-Free Kids organization and formed Faith United Against Tobacco to support efforts to grant the Food and Drug Administration authority over tobacco. On June 22, 2009, President Obama signed the FDA omnibus bill granting them responsibility for the regulation of tobacco.
