= San Nicola Baronia =

- Comune
- Comune di San Nicola Baronia
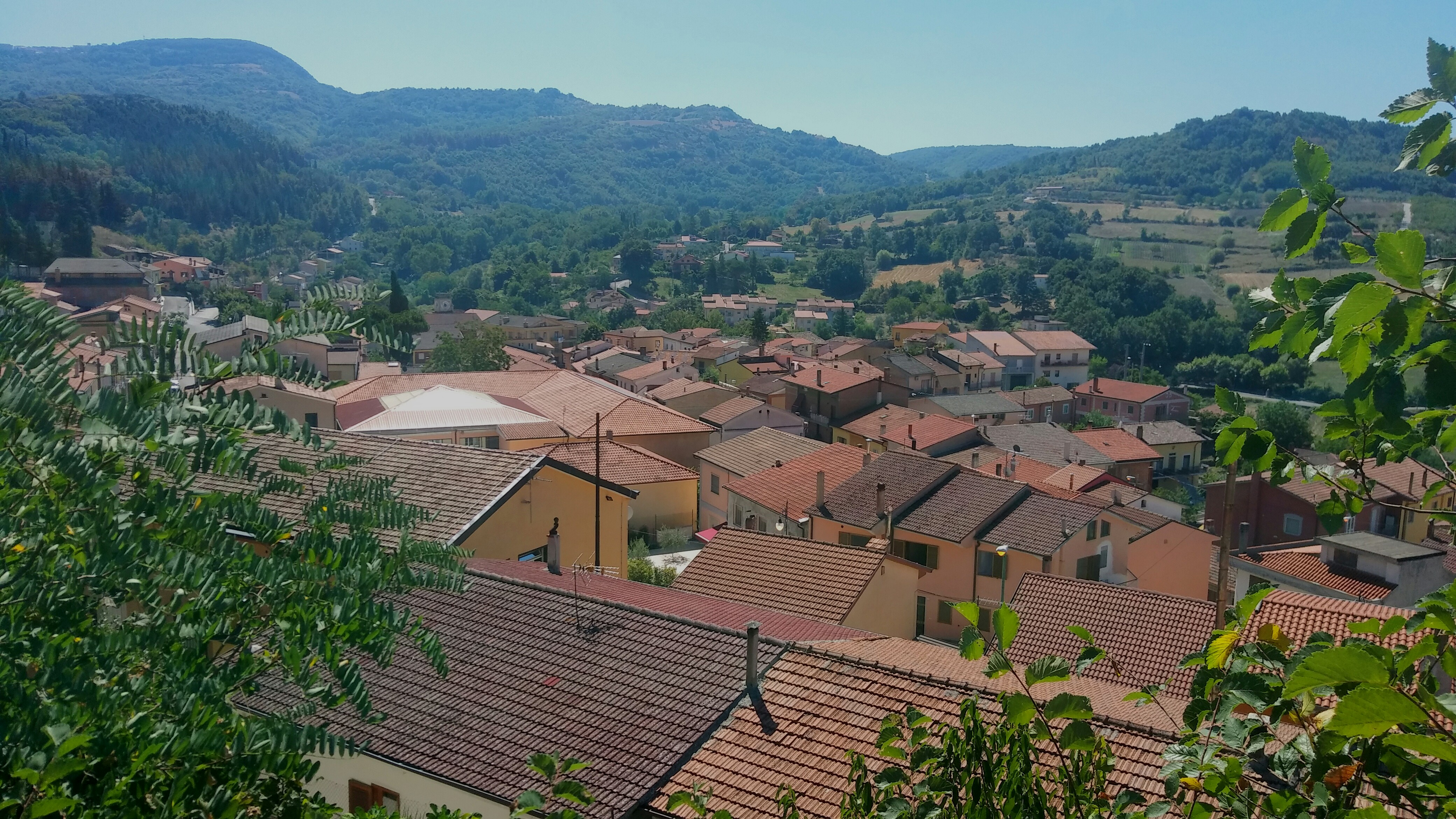

- Location within Italy Location within Campania
- Coordinates: 41°3′N 15°11′E
- Country: Italy
- Region: Campania
- Province: Avellino (AV)
- Frazioni: Ferregne

Government
  - Mayor: Francesco Colella

Area
  - Total: 6.9 km^{2} (2.7 sq mi)
- Elevation: 610 m (2,000 ft)

Population (31 December 2010)
  - Total: 793
  - Density: 110/km^{2} (300/sq mi)
- Demonym: Sannicolesi
- Time zone: UTC+1 (CET)
  - Summer (DST): UTC+2 (CEST)
- Postal code: 83050
- Dialing code: 0827
- Website: Official website

San Nicola Baronia is a town and comune in the province of Avellino, Campania, southern Italy.

Located in the Apennines between the Ufita Valley and Daunian Mountains, the town is part of the Roman Catholic Diocese of Ariano Irpino-Lacedonia. Its territory borders the municipalities of Carife, Castel Baronia, Flumeri, San Sossio Baronia, and Trevico.
