= Walmart (disambiguation) =

Walmart is an American multinational retail corporation.

Wal-Mart or Walmart may also refer to:

- Wal-Mart, a prehistoric Camelops bone found at the construction site of a Wal-Mart store in Mesa, Arizona
- Walmarting, a neologism
- "Walmart", a stand-up comedy sketch by Rodney Carrington from his album Greatest Hits

== See also ==
- Wal-Mart bill, nickname for the Fair Share Health Care Act
- Walmart Canada, the Canadian unit of Walmart
- Walmart Neighborhood Market, a grocery store chain
- Walmartopia, a musical
