= Sturno =

- Comune
- Comune di Sturno
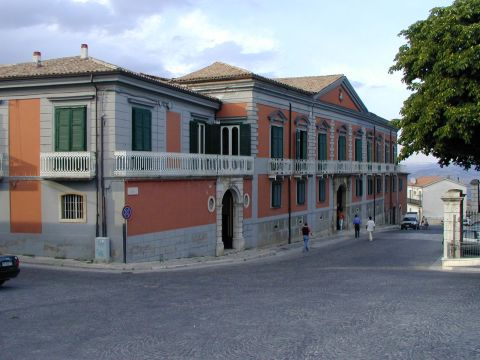

- Location within Italy Location within Campania
- Coordinates: 41°1′N 15°6′E
- Country: Italy
- Region: Campania
- Province: Avellino (AV)

Government
  - Mayor: Vito di Leo

Area
  - Total: 16.67 km^{2} (6.44 sq mi)
- Elevation: 662 m (2,172 ft)

Population (31 December 2017)
  - Total: 3,038
  - Density: 182.2/km^{2} (472.0/sq mi)
- Demonym: Sturnesi
- Time zone: UTC+1 (CET)
  - Summer (DST): UTC+2 (CEST)
- Postal code: 83055
- Dialing code: 0825
- Website: Official website

Sturno is a town and comune in the province of Avellino, in the Campania region of southern Italy.

The town, located in the valley of the Ufita river, is bordered by Carife, Castel Baronia, Flumeri, Frigento and Rocca San Felice.

== History ==
Sturno became an independent township in 1809. Prior to that, Sturno was called Casali di Frigento and was a hamlet of the town of Frigento. As a farming community, it struggled economically in the late 19th and early 20th centuries.

== Economy ==
The surrounding area is farmland under intense cultivation. The local farms are also known for breeding sheep and goats.

== Twin towns ==
- (United States) Glen Cove, New York, USA

== See also ==
- Irpinia
