= Gerolamo Politi =

Most Reverend Gerolamo Politi
- Bishop of Trevico
- Church: Catholic Church
- Diocese: Diocese of Trevico
- In office: 1564–1575
- Predecessor: Agostino Folignatti
- Successor: Benedetto Oliva

Personal details
- Died: 1575 Trevico, Italy

Gerolamo Politi, O.P. (died 1575) was a Roman Catholic prelate who served as Bishop of Trevico (1564–1575).

== Biography ==
Gerolamo Politi was ordained a priest in the Order of Preachers. On 25 October 1564, he was appointed during the papacy of Pope Pius IV as Bishop of Trevico. He served as Bishop of Trevico until his death in 1575.

== External links and additional sources ==
- Cheney, David M. "Diocese of Trevico". Catholic-Hierarchy.org. (for the Chronology of Bishops using non-Latin names) ^{[self-published]}
- Chow, Gabriel. "Titular Episcopal See of Trevico". GCatholic.org. (for the Chronology of Bishops using non-Latin names) ^{[self-published]}

Catholic Church titles
Preceded by Agostino Folignatti	Bishop of Trevico; 1564–1575	Succeeded by Benedetto Oliva
