= Sant'Agata di Puglia =

- Comune
- Comune di Sant'Agata di Puglia
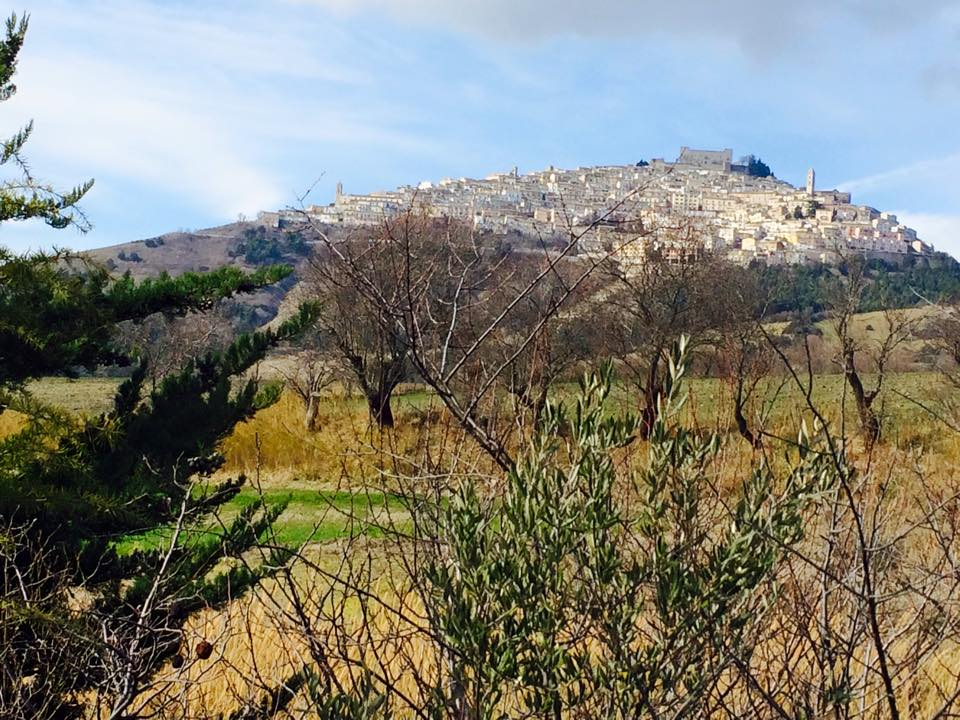
- View of Sant'Agata di Puglia

- Location within Italy Location within Apulia
- Coordinates: 41°9′10″N 15°22′51″E
- Country: Italy
- Region: Apulia
- Province: Foggia (FG)

Government
  - Mayor: Pietro Bove

Area
  - Total: 115.80 km^{2} (44.71 sq mi)
- Elevation: 794 m (2,605 ft)
- Highest elevation: 949 m (3,114 ft)
- Lowest elevation: 235 m (771 ft)

Population (28 February 2017)
  - Total: 2,305
  - Density: 19.91/km^{2} (51.55/sq mi)
- Demonym: Santagatesi
- Time zone: UTC+1 (CET)
  - Summer (DST): UTC+2 (CEST)
- Postal code: 71028
- Dialing code: 0881
- Patron saint: Sant'Agata, San Rocco, and San Lorenzo
- Saint day: 5 February; 16 August and 10 August
- Website: Official website

Sant'Agata di Puglia (Neapolitan: Santaheta) is a town and comune in the province of Foggia in the Apulia region of southeast Italy.

Its territory borders the municipalities of Accadia, Anzano di Puglia, Candela, Deliceto, Lacedonia (AV), Monteleone di Puglia, Rocchetta Sant'Antonio, and Scampitella (AV).
