= Vallesaccarda =

- Comune
- Comune di Vallesaccarda
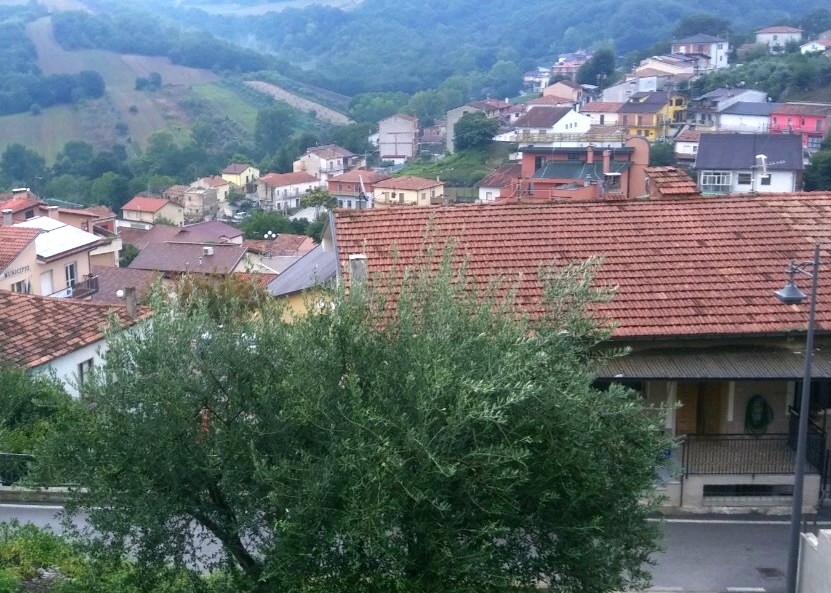

- Coat of arms

- Location within Italy Location within Campania
- Coordinates: 41°4′N 15°15′E
- Country: Italy
- Region: Campania
- Province: Avellino (AV)
- Frazioni: Coccaro, Mattine, San Giuseppe, Serro D'annunzio, Cotugno

Government
  - Mayor: Francesco Pagliarulo

Area
  - Total: 14 km^{2} (5.4 sq mi)
- Elevation: 650 m (2,130 ft)

Population (31 December 2010)
  - Total: 1,357
  - Density: 97/km^{2} (250/sq mi)
- Demonym: Vallesaccardesi
- Time zone: UTC+1 (CET)
  - Summer (DST): UTC+2 (CEST)
- Postal code: 83050
- Dialing code: 0827
- Website: Official website

Vallesaccarda is a town and comune in the province of Avellino, Campania, southern Italy.

Located in the Apennines between the Ufita Valley and Daunian Mountains, the town is part of the Roman Catholic Diocese of Ariano Irpino-Lacedonia. Its territory borders with the municipalities of Anzano di Puglia, San Sossio Baronia, Scampitella, and Trevico.
