= Francesco Alberoni =

Italian journalist and professor of sociology (1929–2023)

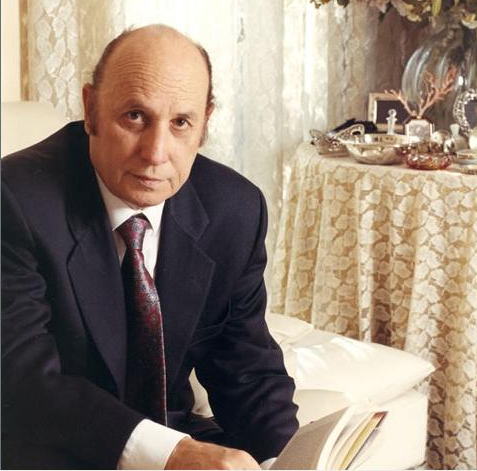
- Alberoni in the 1980s

Chairman of the RAI
- Acting
- In office 5 May 2004 – 31 May 2005
- Preceded by: Lucia Annunziata
- Succeeded by: Sandro Curzi

Chairman of the CSC
- In office 2002 – November 2012
- Preceded by: Office created
- Succeeded by: Stefano Rulli

Personal details
- Born: 31 December 1929 Borgonovo Val Tidone, Italy
- Died: 14 August 2023 (aged 93) Milan, Italy
- Spouses: Vincenza Pugliese (m. 1958; died 1992) Rosa Giannetta (m. 1988; died 2021)
- Education: University of Pavia
- Profession: Sociologist, writer, journalist, manager
- Known for: Notable work on sociology (main political and religious)
- Website: Official website

Francesco Alberoni (31 December 1929 – 14 August 2023) was an Italian journalist and a professor of sociology. He was a board member and senior board member (chairman) of RAI, the Italian state television network, from 2002 to 2005.

Alberoni was among the few regular front page writers of Corriere della Sera, Italy's most popular newspaper, which published his articles from 1973 to 2011. He wrote a four-column editorial titled "Public & Private" (begun in 1982) for the Monday edition. He was the widower of Rosa Giannetta.

== Early days ==
Although Alberoni claimed he was a model student and real perfectionist at school, he admitted he did not like the military-like discipline imposed on schoolchildren by the fascist regime. According to his autobiography he was a born leader, who always invented games and adventures for the group of boys who usually gathered around him. Because there weren't any books in his house, he first read only after the end of the Second World War in 1945. Reading took most of his afternoons at the City Library, his favoured subjects being history and philosophy.

Alberoni studied at the Liceo Scientifico, and then moved to Pavia to study medicine where he graduated. Here he also met the friar Agostino Gemelli, who was intrigued by Alberoni's thinking and bright intelligence, and pushed him to pursue studies in the field of social behavior. During his studies in Pavia, he met Vincenza Pugliese (1929–1992) whom he married in 1958.

From his marriage to Vincenza Pugliese he has three children: Margherita (born in 1959), Francesca (born in 1961) and Paolo Giovanni Agostino (born in 1968), named after friar Agostino Gemelli. Later, Alberoni lived with Laura Bonin, from whom he had a fourth son: Giulio (named after the famous ancestor). In 1998, Alberoni married Rosa Giannetta, the former mistress of Italian architect Roberto Guiducci.

== Academic career ==
His academic career includes the following positions:

- Adjunct professor of Psychology at the Catholic University of Milan in 1960
- Adjunct professor of Sociology in 1961, and then full professor of Sociology (again at the University of Milan) in 1964
- Member of the Bi-national Committee Olivetti Foundation-Ford Foundation Social Science Research Council
- Dean of the University of Trento (Italy) from 1968 to 1970.
- Professor at the University of Lausanne, the University of Catania, and then again back at the University of Milan (1978)
- Former Teacher of IULM University. He was Dean of the School until 2001
- board member of Cinecittà Cinema Holding of Rome (2002–2005)
- Dean of the Experimental Center for Cinematography (2003–current)

== Published works ==
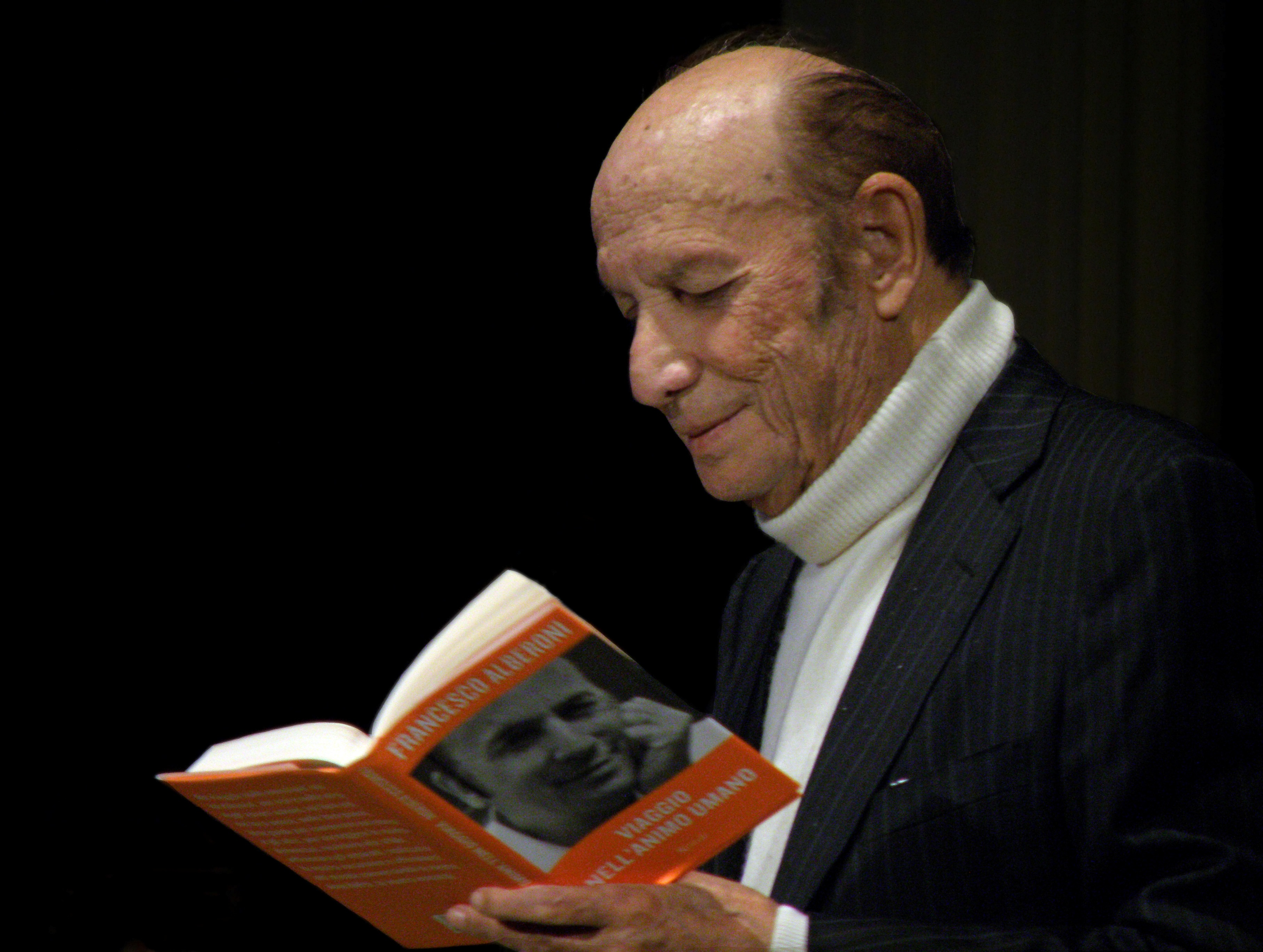
Alberoni reading his book at Teatro San Babila, Milan, 2012

Alberoni has carried out numerous studies on Sociology of Movements and Individuals, and especially on the nature of Love and relationships among individuals and groups.

The building block of Alberoni though is found in Movement and Institution, which is among the first books on the sociological analysis of movements, their start, development and end. This book has been considered a milestone in the analysis of social movements. The concept developed here is the so-called Statu Nascenti, the "nascent state", the moment in which leadership, ideas, and communication, come together and fuel the birth of movements.

This first work was followed by Consumption and Society, which contributed to fuel the growth of marketing schools in Italy.

In 1979, Alberoni published his best-seller Falling in Love. In the book, which further develops and expands the ideas and theoretical models from Movements and Institutions, he maintains that the experience of falling in love is in essence the nascent state (or "ignition state") of a collective movement made up exclusively of two people. This time, however, Alberoni explores the subject in greater detail, using as much as possible the language of love stories rather than the abstract jargon of psychoanalysis or sociology. This book, which was rigorously scientific and at the same time innovative in its linguistic slant, turned into an international best-seller translated into twenty languages. After more than ten editions, it is still in print in Italy.

Alberoni's next works were L'amicizia ("Friendship") of 1984, and Erotismo ("Eroticism") of 1986, in which he compares male and female eroticism. Then followed The Nuptial Flight (Garzanti, Milan, 1992), where he took a closer look at pre-adolescent and adolescent crushes on film stars, and then at the general feminine tendency to seek out superior love objects.

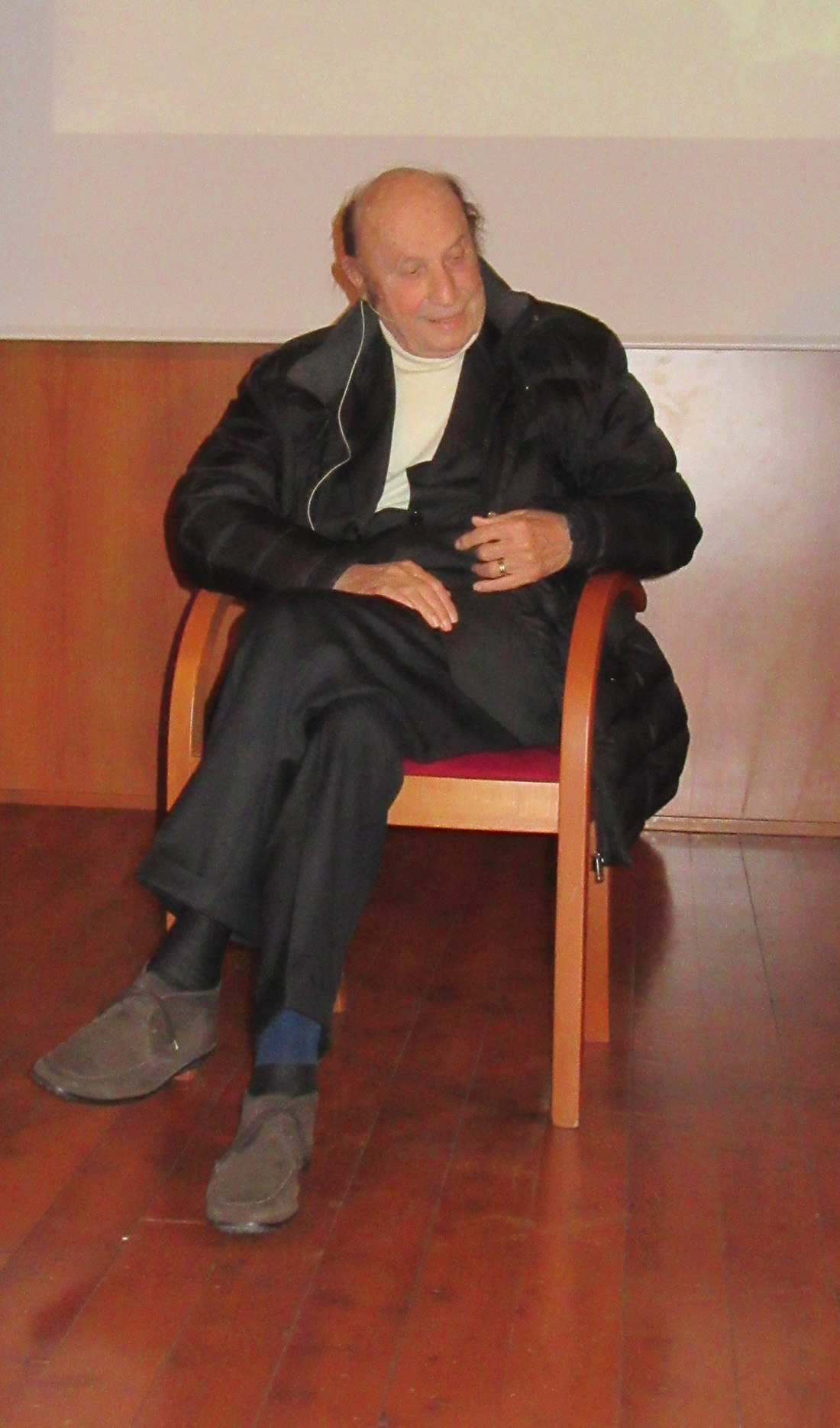
Alberoni in Codogno, 11 December 2016

His sociology books include Genesi (1989), which illustrates his theories about the fundamental experience of the nascent state, the difference between the nascent state and Nirvana, the concept of democracy, and what he termed "Cultural Civilizations".

Collections of brief essays on the subject of collective movements, a number of which were included in The Sources of Dreams (Rizzoli, Milan, 2000), were later published under the more appropriate title of My Theories and My Life. His essays from Corriere della Sera are usually in collected into book editions by Rizzoli.

Alberoni's books have had a great success both in Italy and abroad, having been translated in many countries, including Japan, Spain, France, Denmark, Brazil, Sweden, Turkey and Israel.

His books composed of newspaper articles have been pointed out by some critics as lacking scientific analysis, allegedly reducing to platitudinous advice about today's life and love matters.

The most recent books are considered by critics innovative and notable both for originality of the content as well as writing style. Specifically "Mystery of falling in love" in the second part of the treatise offers an original critique to the most important theories of falling in love, especially with reference to the French social school. "Sex and Love" is the first systematic analysis in the field and is a break-through in its approach to the subject.

== Death ==
Alberoni died of kidney disease in Milan, on 14 August 2023, at the age of 93.

== Bibliography ==
- L'elite senza potere ("Elite without Power", 1963)
- Statu Nascenti (1968)
- Classi e generazioni ("Classes and Generations", 1970)
- Italia in trasformazione ("Italy in Transformation", 1976)
- Movimento e istituzione (Movement and Institution, 1977)
- Innamoramento e amore (Falling in Love, 1979)
- Le ragioni del bene e del male ("The Reasons for Good and Evil", 1981)
- L'albero della vita ("The Tree of Life", 1982)
- L'amicizia ("Friendship", 1984) ("Friendship", Brill, 2016, trans and intro H. Blatterer & S. Magaraggia)
- L'erotismo ("Eroticism", 1986)
- I giovani verso il Duemila (with F. Ferrarotti and C. Calvaruso, 1986)
- Pubblico & privato ("Public and the Private", 1987)
- L'altruismo e la morale ("Altruism and Morality", with Salvatore Veca, 1989)
- Genesi ("Genesis", 1989)
- Gli invidiosi ("The Envious", 1991)
- Il volo nuziale ("The Nuptial Flight", 1992)
- Valori ("Values", 1993)
- L'ottimismo ("Optimism", 1994)
- Ti amo ("I Love You", 1996)
- Il primo amore ("First Love", 1997)
- Abbiate coraggio ("Find the Courage", 1998)
- Le sorgenti dei sogni ("The Sources of Dreams", 2000)
- La speranza ("Hope", 2001)
- L'arte del commando ("The Art of Commanding", 2002)
- Il mistero dell'innamoramento ("The Mystery of Falling in Love", 2003)
- Sesso e amore (Sex and Love, 2005)
