= San Sossio Baronia =

- Comune
- Comune di San Sossio Baronia
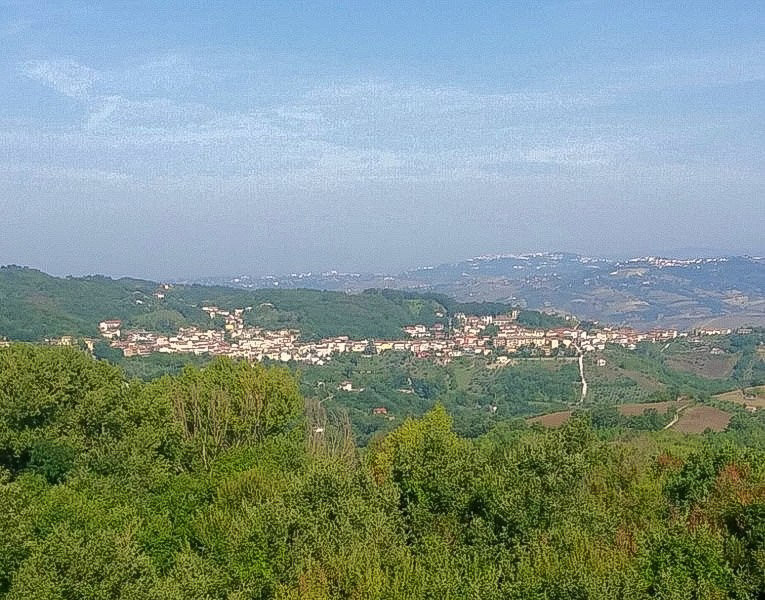

- Location within Italy Location within Campania
- Coordinates: 41°4′N 15°12′E
- Country: Italy
- Region: Campania
- Province: Avellino (AV)
- Frazioni: Civita, Molara, Montuccio, Turro, Montemauro

Government
  - Mayor: Giovanni Contardi

Area
  - Total: 19.19 km^{2} (7.41 sq mi)
- Elevation: 650 m (2,130 ft)

Population (31 December 2017)
  - Total: 1,598
  - Density: 83.27/km^{2} (215.7/sq mi)
- Demonym: Sossiani
- Time zone: UTC+1 (CET)
  - Summer (DST): UTC+2 (CEST)
- Postal code: 83050
- Dialing code: 0827
- Patron saint: St. Sossius
- Website: Official website

San Sossio Baronia is a town and comune in the province of Avellino, Campania, Italy. Its name refers to Saint Sossius, a Roman Catholic martyr.

Located in the Apennines between the Ufita Valley and Daunian Mountains, the town is part of the Roman Catholic Diocese of Ariano Irpino-Lacedonia. Its territory borders the municipalities of Anzano di Puglia (FG), Flumeri, Monteleone di Puglia (FG), San Nicola Baronia, Trevico, Vallesaccarda and Zungoli.
