= Vallata =

- Comune
- Comune di Vallata
- Location within Italy Location within Campania
- Coordinates: 41°2′N 15°15′E
- Country: Italy
- Region: Campania
- Province: Avellino (AV)

Area
  - Total: 47.67 km^{2} (18.41 sq mi)
- Elevation: 870 m (2,850 ft)

Population (1 May 2009)
  - Total: 2,930
  - Density: 61.5/km^{2} (159/sq mi)
- Time zone: UTC+1 (CET)
  - Summer (DST): UTC+2 (CEST)
- Postal code: 83059
- Dialing code: 0827
- ISTAT code: 064114
- Patron saint: San Bartolomeo
- Saint day: 24 August
- Website: Official website

Vallata (Irpino: Vaddàta) is a town and comune in the province of Avellino, Campania, Italy.

Located in the Apennines between the Ufita Valley and Daunian Mountains, the town is part of the Roman Catholic Diocese of Ariano Irpino-Lacedonia. Its territory borders the municipalities of Bisaccia, Carife, Guardia Lombardi, Scampitella, and Trevico.
