= Donato Pascasio =

17th-century Roman Catholic bishop

Most Reverend Donato Pascasio
- Bishop of Trevico
- Church: Catholic Church
- Diocese: Diocese of Trevico
- In office: 1646–1664
- Predecessor: Alessandro Salzilla
- Successor: Marco Vaccina

Orders
- Consecration: 22 Apr 1646 by Pier Luigi Carafa (seniore)

Personal details
- Born: Castel Vecchio, Italy
- Died: 13 February 1664

Donato Pascasio, O.S.B. Cel. (died 1664) was a Roman Catholic prelate who served as Bishop of Trevico (1646–1664).

== Biography ==
Donato Pascasio was born in Castel Vecchio, Italy and ordained a priest in the Celestine Order of Saint Benedict. On 9 April 1646, he was appointed during the papacy of Pope Innocent X as Bishop of Trevico. On 22 April 1646, he was consecrated bishop by Pier Luigi Carafa (seniore), Cardinal-Priest of Santi Silvestro e Martino ai Monti, with Alfonso Sacrati, Bishop Emeritus of Comacchio, and Ranuccio Scotti Douglas, Bishop of Borgo San Donnino, serving as co-consecrators. He served as Bishop of Trevico until his death on 13 February 1664.

While bishop, he was the principal co-consecrator of Pietro Paolo Russo, Bishop of Nusco (1649).

== External links and additional sources ==
- Cheney, David M. "Diocese of Trevico". Catholic-Hierarchy.org. (for the Chronology of Bishops using non-Latin names) ^{[self-published]}
- Chow, Gabriel. "Titular Episcopal See of Trevico". GCatholic.org. (for the Chronology of Bishops using non-Latin names) ^{[self-published]}

Catholic Church titles
Preceded by Alessandro Salzilla	Bishop of Trevico; 1646–1664	Succeeded by Marco Vaccina
