= Benedetto Oliva =

Most Reverend Benedetto Oliva
- Bishop of Trevico
- Church: Catholic Church
- Diocese: Diocese of Trevico
- In office: 1575–1576
- Predecessor: Gerolamo Politi
- Successor: Antonio Balducci

Personal details
- Died: 13 January 1576 Trevico, Italy

Benedetto Oliva (died 1576) was a Roman Catholic prelate who served as Bishop of Trevico (1575–1576).

== Biography ==
On 2 September 1575, Benedetto Oliva was appointed during the papacy of Pope Gregory XIII as Bishop of Trevico. He served as Bishop of Trevico until his death on 13 January 1576.

== External links and additional sources ==
- Cheney, David M. "Diocese of Trevico". Catholic-Hierarchy.org. (for the Chronology of Bishops using non-Latin names) ^{[self-published]}
- Chow, Gabriel. "Titular Episcopal See of Trevico". GCatholic.org. (for the Chronology of Bishops using non-Latin names) ^{[self-published]}

Catholic Church titles
Preceded by Gerolamo Politi	Bishop of Trevico; 1575–1576	Succeeded by Antonio Balducci
