= Zungoli =

- Comune
- Comune di Zungoli
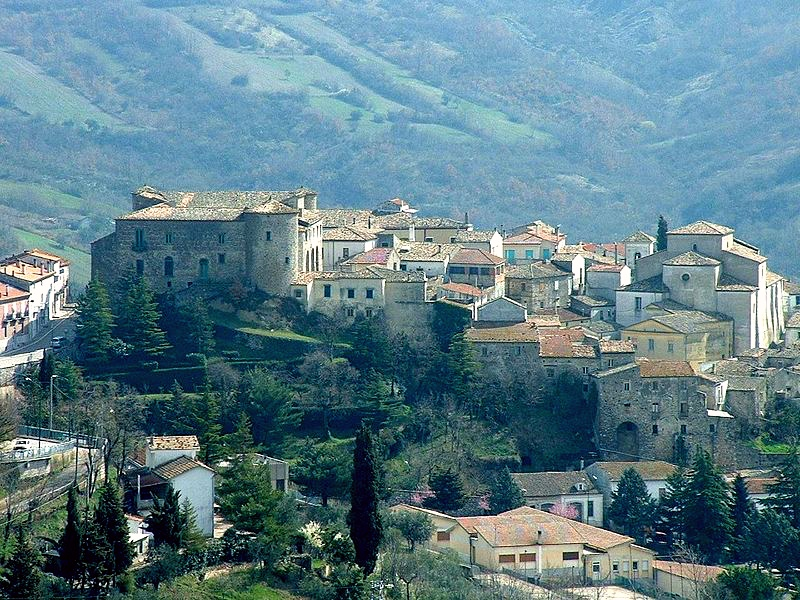

- Location within Italy Location within Campania
- Coordinates: 41°7′N 15°12′E
- Country: Italy
- Region: Campania
- Province: Avellino

Government
  - Mayor: Paolo Caruso

Area
  - Total: 19 km^{2} (7.3 sq mi)
- Elevation: 657 m (2,156 ft)

Population (1 January 2017)
  - Total: 1,088
  - Density: 57/km^{2} (150/sq mi)
- Demonym: Zungolesi
- Time zone: UTC+1 (CET)
  - Summer (DST): UTC+2 (CEST)
- Postal code: 83030
- Dialing code: 0825
- Website: Official website

Zungoli is a town and comune in the province of Avellino, Campania, southern Italy, about 58 kilometres (36 mi) from the town of Avellino.

Located in Irpinia historical district between the Ufita Valley and Daunian Mountains, Zungoli is awarded a quality mark, Bandiera arancione, and it is one of I Borghi più belli d'Italia ("The most beautiful villages of Italy").

Zungoli is believed to have been settled around 900 AD. Many of the Italians in Dobbs Ferry in the U.S. state of New York are descendants of immigrants from Zungoli, as are communities of Italians in Bristol UK.

The town is part of the Roman Catholic Diocese of Ariano Irpino-Lacedonia and its territory borders the municipalities of Anzano di Puglia, Ariano Irpino, Flumeri, Monteleone di Puglia, San Sossio Baronia, and Villanova del Battista.
