= Nascent state =

Transcendental psychological state

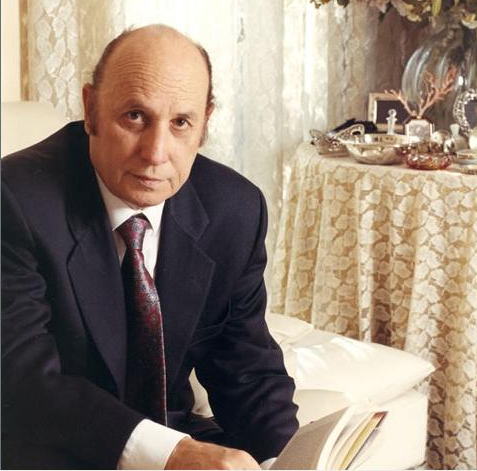
Francesco Alberoni holds that the experience of falling in love originates in an extreme depression.

A nascent state (Latin: statu nascenti) is a psychological process of destruction-reorganization where the individual becomes capable of merging with other persons and creating a new collectivity with a very high degree of solidarity. Philip Wexler summarises the nascent state sociologically as "the moment or rebirth that precedes historical collective, transformative actions".

== Concept ==
This concept was first defined by Francesco Alberoni, a prominent Italian sociologist, journalist, and professor in sociology, in his book Statu nascenti. It is one of the three social states Alberoni identified as traversed by collective movements. He explained that individuals who go through this condition experience a strange episode that causes them to have an alternative view of existence. Such anomaly is said to liberate an individual from prohibitions but is also temporary, existing in reaction to its reception by social institutions. This experience has also been referred to as "depressive overload" in Alberoni's Movement and Institution, and is attributed to the perception of too much contradictions. In the context of social analysis, Alberoni identified fetishism, addiction, and obsession, among other factors that inhibit the subjective realignments as prerequisites to a nascent state.

It is said that individuals who go through the same experience or participated in the same nascent state share an understanding and makes them profoundly similar. This entails the restructuring of the fields of experiences to new ends so that participants share an affinity that also marks their distinction. Alberoni also posited that the individual who reached this state tends to seek others who share the same view, which launches the birth and growth of movements. According to Alberoni, "Up till now, sociologists, psychologists, and philosophers have displayed a sort of repugnance or embarrassment in admitting that there is something in common—or better, something identical—to be found both in great historical processes like Islam, the French Revolution, or the Russian Revolution and in such personal, banal phenomena as the experience of falling in love."

== Applications ==
In his book Falling in Love and Loving, Alberoni defends that there are similarities to be found between massive collective movements and love relationships:

In an analogous way, the falling-in-love process is the simplest form of a collective movement. [...]

The definition given of the falling-in-love process (i.e. the nascent state of a collective movement made up of two people) offers us a theoretical slot in which to position this mysterious phenomenon of collective movements. Not only, but the same definition provides us with an extraordinary tool for investigating the nature of all such movements.

Falling in love is seen as the nascent state of a collective movement formed by only two people. According to Francesco Alberoni, the phenomenology of falling in love is the same for young people and adults, for men and women, and for homosexuals and heterosexuals. This is because the structure of the nascent state is always the same. The feeling of meaning experienced in this relationship is reinforced by a joint effort to overcome obstacles and to escape entropy.

There is also the case of the experience that leads an individual to become a priest. Such experience leaves an indelible mark so that even if he is reduced to the status of the laity, his disposition remains. Nascent state has also been likened to the concept of networked flow, which is said to be an offshoot of the feeling of liminality. This experience is created by the sensation of sharing objectives and ideals such as in the case of organizations that are aiming to introduce change.

Nascent state was also used to describe the existence of the so-called revolutionary sect. The experience that alters the outlook or orientation involves the failure of social solidarity. The revolutionary sect emerges as a form of the social system's reconstructive response where the unique experience prompt individuals to collectively reach an alternative interpretation and attempt to create an alternative whole by opposing the existing order. A variation of this nascent state is the so-called indigenous movement. It is said to have emerged in the 1960s after an increase in awareness of common struggle that takes place within a political-historical context. Local indigenous peoples started the movement after a discontinuity from life. Their critique of the state and their common feeling lead to a solidarity or a mobilization centered around a charismatic individual who is challenging the system. There are scholars who identify this movement among other similar cases of social movements as a precursor to the foundation of new political parties as demonstrated by the Front National and La France Insoumise in France and the Podemos or Ciudadanos in Spain.
