= Scampitella =

- Comune
- Comune di Scampitella
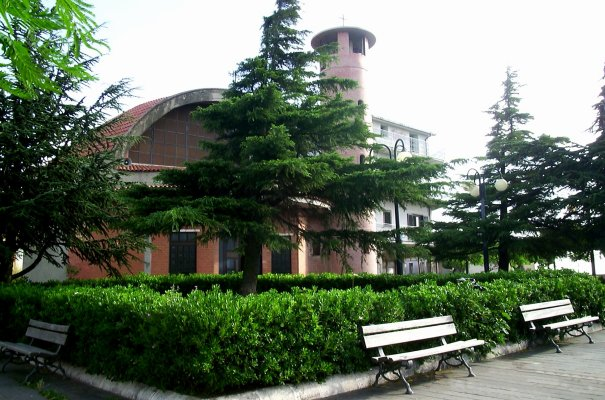

- Location within Italy Location within Campania
- Coordinates: 41°6′N 15°17′E
- Country: Italy
- Region: Campania
- Province: Avellino (AV)

Area
  - Total: 15 km^{2} (5.8 sq mi)
- Elevation: 720 m (2,360 ft)

Population (1 May 2009)
  - Total: 1,319
  - Density: 88/km^{2} (230/sq mi)
- Demonym: Scampitellesi
- Time zone: UTC+1 (CET)
  - Summer (DST): UTC+2 (CEST)
- Postal code: 83050
- Dialing code: 0827
- ISTAT code: 064097
- Patron saint: San Michele Arcangelo
- Saint day: 9 May
- Website: Official website

Scampitella (Irpino: Scampetèdde) is a town and comune in the province of Avellino, Campania, Italy.

Located upon the Apennines watershed between the Ufita Valley and Daunian Mountains, the town is part of the Roman Catholic Diocese of Ariano Irpino-Lacedonia. Its territory borders with the municipalities of Anzano di Puglia (in Apulia), Bisaccia, Lacedonia, Sant'Agata di Puglia (in Apulia), Trevico, Vallata, and Vallesaccarda.

Scampitella is 67 km from Avellino, the province capital, and 120 km from Naples, the regional capital.
