= Monteleone di Puglia =

- Comune
- Comune di Monteleone di Puglia
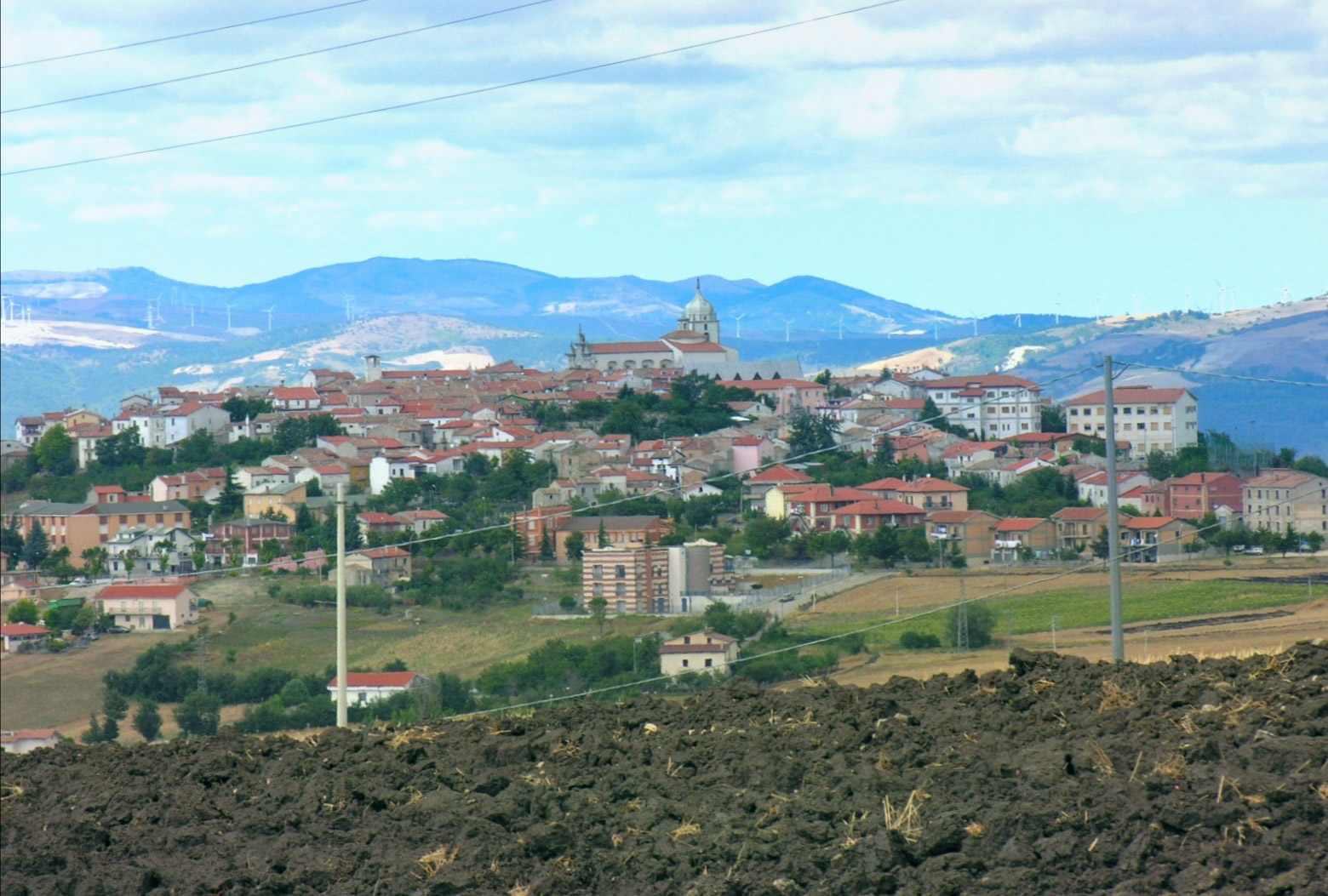
- View of Monteleone

- Coat of arms

- Location within Italy Location within Apulia
- Coordinates: 41°10′N 15°16′E
- Country: Italy
- Region: Apulia
- Province: Foggia (FG)

Government
  - Mayor: Sebastiano Maraschiello

Area
  - Total: 36.42 km^{2} (14.06 sq mi)
- Elevation: 842 m (2,762 ft)

Population (28 February 2026)
  - Total: 908
  - Density: 24.9/km^{2} (64.6/sq mi)
- Demonym: Monteleonesi
- Time zone: UTC+1 (CET)
  - Summer (DST): UTC+2 (CEST)
- Postal code: 71020
- Dialing code: 0881
- Website: Official website

Monteleone di Puglia (Irpinian: Munteleòne) is a hill town and comune of the province of Foggia in the Apulia region of south-eastern Italy.

Its territory borders the municipalities of Accadia, Anzano di Puglia, Ariano Irpino (AV), Panni, San Sossio Baronia (AV), Sant'Agata di Puglia, Savignano Irpino (AV), Zungoli (AV).

== History ==
The town was historically inhabited by Provençal refugees (followers of the Waldensian Protestant rite) and Arbëreshë community, but both have since assimilated. Until 16th century Monteleone did not have its own territory, because it was part of the city of Ariano.

In 1942, during World War II, Monteleone was the seat of a revolt women, sparked by the arrogance of a Carabinieri officer who confiscated a pot of corn flour that was being carried to a local bakery by three women. The women resisted, pleading with the officer. The women were brought by the officer to the Fascist regime-appointed mayor. The mayor sided with the officer, and the women were promptly imprisoned in a warehouse filled with cheese and other foods. The women set the warehouse on fire and escaped. Upon hearing of the hoards of food being stored by the Carabinieri while the people were hungry, an angry mob formed and the Carabinieri office was stormed. Police had trouble controlling the riot and fired warning shots into the air. Soon after, police began firing bullets towards the crowd. Eventually, the citizens of Monteleone - armed with clubs and pitchforks - were subdued when reinforcements were sent by the prefect of Foggia, Giovanni Dolfin. Overall, 180 citizens were arrested and detained. Most rioters arrested had to serve a prison sentence of between a few days and 15 months. This revolt was the first of its kind in Italy during the Second World War.

In the years following the war, a large number of migrants from the town and their descendants established an expatriate community in Toronto, Ontario, Canada. There is a club in Toronto for those who have roots in Monteleone.

== Festivals ==
The patron saints of Monteleone are San Rocco and Saint John the Baptist.

== People ==
Monteleone is the birthplace of the Canadian politician Joe Volpe.
