= Rosa Giannetta =

Italian novelist, journalist, and sociologist (1945–2021)

- Born: 11 April 1945; Trevico, Italy
- Died: 3 January 2021 (aged 75); Forte dei Marmi, Italy
- Education: IULM University of Milan
- Spouse: Francesco Alberoni (m. 1988)
- Writing career
- Years active: 1980–2014
- Website: Official website

Rosa Giannetta Alberoni (née Rosa Giannetta; 11 April 1945 – 3 January 2021) was an Italian novelist, journalist, and professor of sociology.

== Biography ==
Giannetta was born in Trevico, in the province of Avellino, Italy. In 1974 she graduated from the University Institute of Modern Languages (IULM) in Milan with a degree in modern foreign languages and literature.

In her initial research, she focused on a sociological study of young people and their language, and later moved into studying philosophy. In the 1990s, she studied the works of Rousseau, Hegel and Marx and the philosophical issues that led to the development of anti-Christianity in Europe. She later also analysed Michelangelo's Sistine Chapel frescoes, and wrote a critique of Darwinist ideology. She stated that Darwinism produces attitudes such as racism, classism and biological discrimination. Giannetta won the Gianni Brera Award for non-fiction.

As a journalist, Giannetta wrote for newspapers such as La Stampa, Il Giorno and Corriere della Sera and for magazines such as Gioia, Anna and Oggi. She also contributed to radio and television broadcasts.

Giannetta also wrote historical fiction. She wrote a series of novels set between 1786 and 1814 in the Napoleonic era and located between the Kingdoms of Naples and Milan, and a second series centred on four generations of a family that moves between Versilia and Milan. Her novels won two awards: the Gargano Prize for literature and the Romeo Gigli Prize for fiction.

== Personal life ==
She became the second wife to Francesco Alberoni, a sociologist, in 1988, and began using his surname in addition to her own, as marketing tool to promote her books.

Giannetta died on 3 January 2021 at her home in Forte dei Marmi after an illness.

== Published works ==
=== Academic works ===
- Alberoni, R. (1984). L'era dei mass media: Note sociologiche sulla storia delle comunicazioni di massa. Milano: Coop. libraria I.U.L.M.
- Giannetta, A. R., Di, F. G., & ISTUR. (1992). Complicità e competizione. Milano: Harlequin Mondadori.
- Alberoni, R. G. (1993). Gli esploratori del tempo. Le concezioni della storia da Vico a Popper. Milano, Rizzoli.
- Giannetta, A. R. (2000). Hegel, sociologo nostro contemporaneo.
- Giannetta, A. R. (2007). La cacciata di Cristo. Milano: Rizzoli.
- Alberoni, R. G., & Martino, R. R. (2007). Il Dio di Michelangelo e la barba di Darwin. Milano: Rizzoli.

=== Fiction ===
- Alberoni, R. G. (1991). L'orto del paradiso. Milano: A. Mondadori.
- Alberoni, R. G. (1994). Paolo e Francesca. Milano: Rizzoli.
- Alberoni, R. G. (1998). Io voglio. Milano: Biblioteca universale Rizzoli.
- Alberoni, R. G. (1999). Sinfonia. Milano: Rizzoli.
- Giannetta, A. R. (2005). La montagna di luce. Milano: Rizzoli.
- Giannetta, A. R. (2010). Intrigo al Concilio Vaticano II. Verona: Fede & Cultura.
- Alberoni, R. G. (2011). Arianna sfida il destino. Milano: Rizzoli.
