= Anzano di Puglia =

- Comune
- Comune di Anzano di Puglia
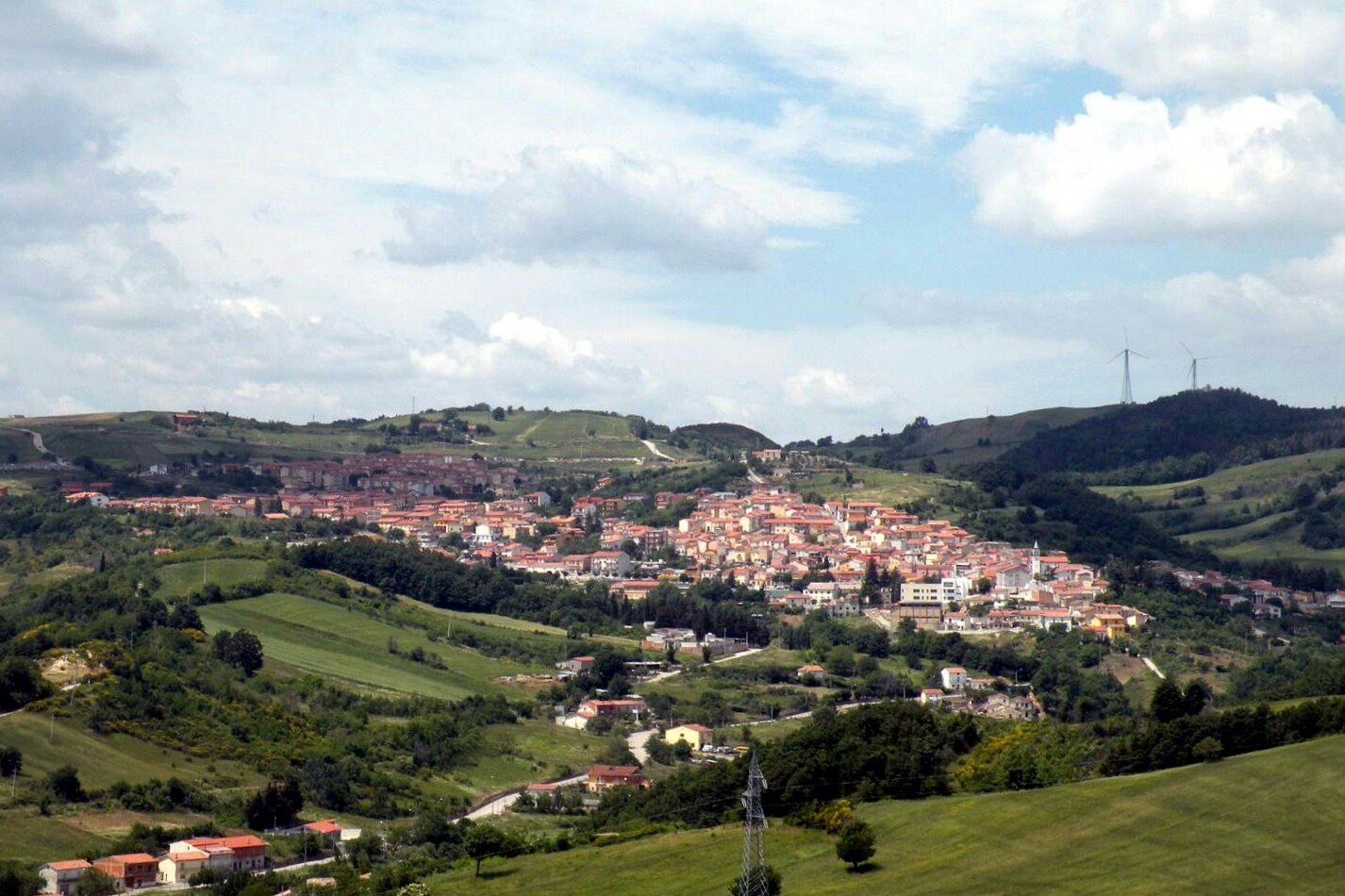
- View of Anzano di Puglia

- Location of Anzano di Puglia in Italy Anzano di Puglia (Apulia)
- Coordinates: 41°07′22″N 15°17′17″E
- Country: Italy
- Region: Apulia
- Province: Foggia (FG)
- Frazioni: Carifano, Lo Russo, Losciarpo, Mastralessio, Morra, Nocelle

Government
  - Mayor: Paolo Lavanga

Area
  - Total: 11.02 km^{2} (4.25 sq mi)
- Elevation: 760 m (2,490 ft)

Population (2026)
  - Total: 1,055
  - Density: 95.74/km^{2} (248.0/sq mi)
- Demonym: Anzanese
- Time zone: UTC+1 (CET)
  - Summer (DST): UTC+2 (CEST)
- Postal code: 71020
- Dialing code: 0881
- ISTAT code: 071003
- Patron saint: Madonna of Anzano
- Saint day: First monday after Pentecost
- Website: Official website

Anzano di Puglia is a town and comune (municipality) in the Province of Foggia in the region of Apulia in Southern Italy. It has 1,055 inhabitants.

At 760 metres (2,490 ft) above sea level, the town lies along the Apennines, astride the Daunian Mountains at the intersection of two ancient Roman roads, namely Via Herculea and Via Aurelia Aeclanensis, which leads to Herdonias. The town is part of the Roman Catholic Diocese of Ariano Irpino-Lacedonia and its territory borders the municipalities of Monteleone di Puglia, San Sossio Baronia, Sant'Agata di Puglia, Scampitella, Vallesaccarda, and Zungoli.

== History ==
Its geographical position has led to its possession changing several times over the centuries. At some times it has been in Apulia, at others in Campania. In 1810, when it belonged to the Kingdom of the Two Sicilies, it was made part of the province of Foggia. In 1862 it was absorbed by the province of Avellino and named "Anzano degli Irpini", but in 1931 it was returned to the province of Foggia.

== Demographics ==
As of 2026, the population is 1,055, of which 48.4% are male, and 51.6% are female. Minors make up 11.5% of the population, and seniors make up 28.2%.

Historical population

Year	Pop.	±%
1861	2,126	—
1871	2,370	+11.5%
1881	2,710	+14.3%
1901	2,734	+0.9%
1911	2,897	+6.0%
1921	2,975	+2.7%
1931	3,110	+4.5%
1936	3,308	+6.4%

Year	Pop.	±%
1951	3,550	+7.3%
1961	3,163	−10.9%
1971	2,631	−16.8%
1981	2,366	−10.1%
1991	2,365	−0.0%
2001	2,239	−5.3%
2011	1,617	−27.8%
2021	1,103	−31.8%

Source: ISTAT

=== Immigration ===
As of 2025, of the known countries of birth of 1,031 residents, the most numerous are: Italy (953 – 92.4%), Germany (22 – 2.1%), Romania (9 – 0.9%), Morocco (8 – 0.8%), Albania (7 – 0.7%).
