= Accadia =

- Comune
- Comune di Accadia
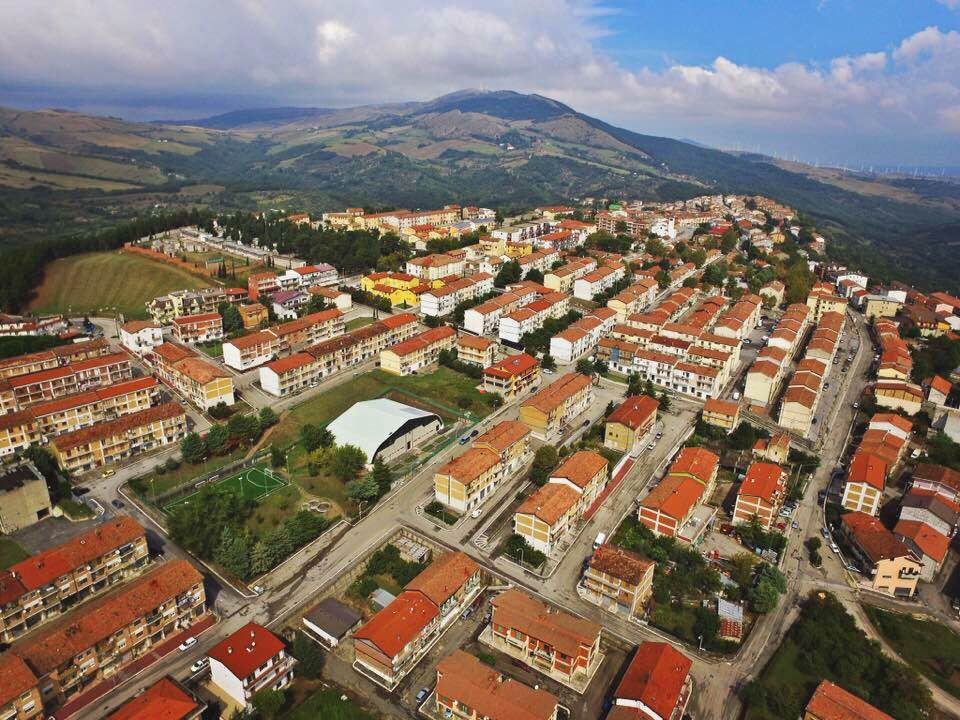
- View of Accadia

- Location of Accadia in Italy Accadia (Apulia)
- Coordinates: 41°10′N 15°20′E
- Country: Italy
- Region: Apulia
- Province: Foggia (FG)
- Frazioni: Agata delle Noci

Government
  - Mayor: Agostino De Paolis

Area
  - Total: 30.48 km^{2} (11.77 sq mi)
- Elevation: 650 m (2,130 ft)

Population (28 February 2017)
  - Total: 2,374
  - Density: 77.89/km^{2} (201.7/sq mi)
- Demonym: Accadiesi
- Time zone: UTC+1 (CET)
  - Summer (DST): UTC+2 (CEST)
- Postal code: 71021
- Dialing code: 0881
- Patron saint: Saint Sebastian
- Saint day: 20 January
- Website: Official website

Accadia (Irpino: Acchedìe) is a town and comune in the province of Foggia in the Apulia region of southeast Italy. Until the mid-20th century it was just within the eastern frontier of the region of Campania in the province of Avellino.

The town occupies a hilltop at 650 metres (2,130 ft) of elevation, in the Daunian Mountains along the Apennines. It is not far from Foggia on the rich agricultural plains of the Tavoliere delle Puglie in the east, nor from Naples to the west. Population increases in summer when many of its migrant labour force return home to take up temporary residence and visit family.

Accadia borders the municipalities of Bovino, Deliceto, Monteleone di Puglia, Panni, and Sant'Agata di Puglia.

== History ==
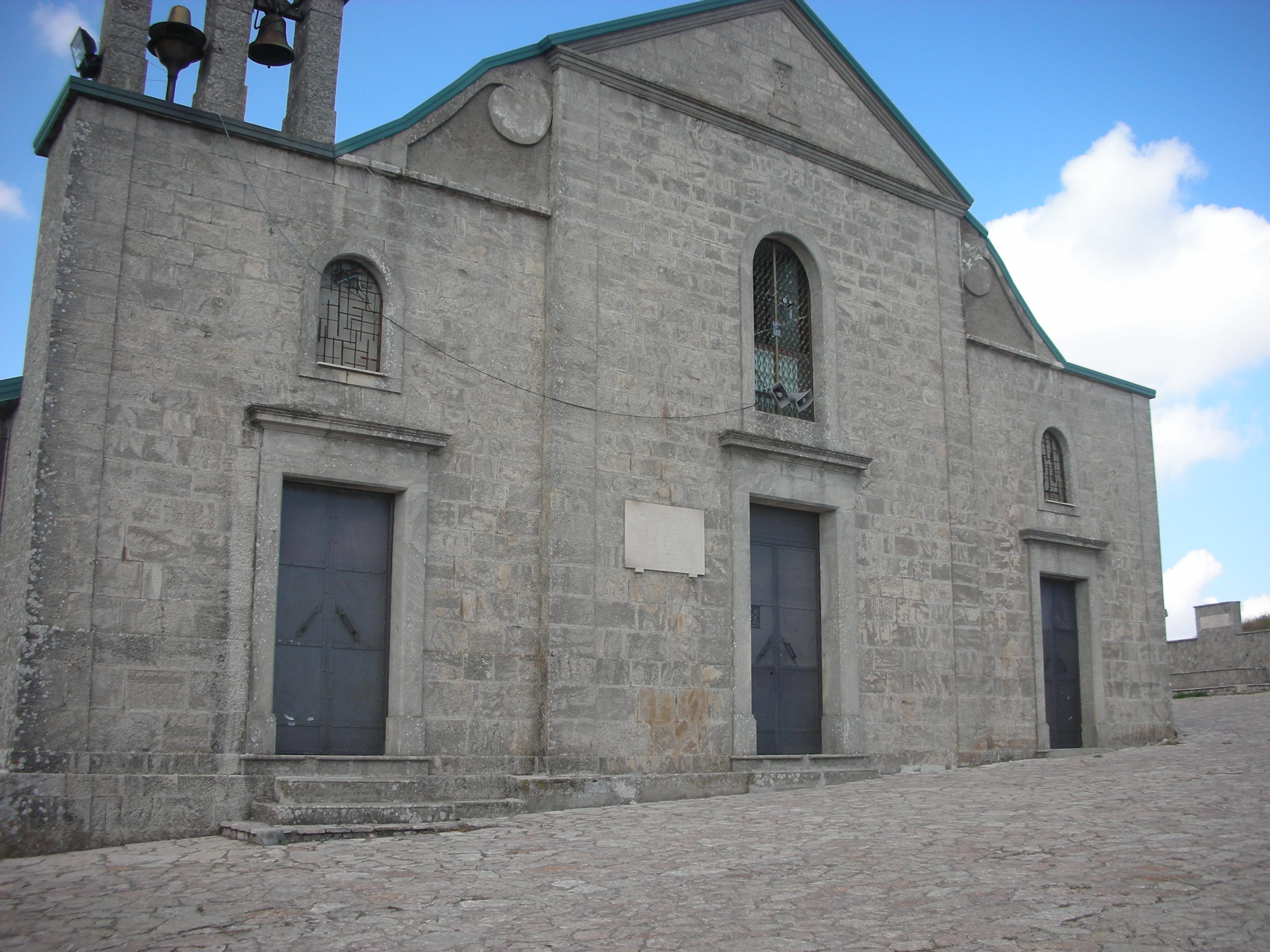
Church of Madonna del Carmine

The town originated as a settlement of Daunians (or maybe Hirpini) during the 1st millennium BC. Later it was part of the Roman Empire. Its name stems from Latin aqua cadiva ("falling water"), which contrasts with nearby Acquatorta village ("channeled water").

In the past it had a much larger population. A Neapolitan army sacked it during the Bourbon period. They took the town gates as booty, and these are still in the civic museum in Naples. These events are recorded on a frieze on the clock tower on the main square in the centre of the town. There is one remaining Roman arch at a former entrance to the town.

There has been extensive redevelopment of the former old quarter of town, which was abandoned after an earthquake in the 1930s. At this time a large portion of the population emigrated and established a colony in Buffalo, New York, in the United States.

== Twin towns ==
- San Marco in Lamis, Italy, since 2008

Accadia has also a friendship agreement with Spello, also in Italy.
