= Giovanni Dolfin (politician) =

Italian politician (1902–1968)

Member of the Chamber of Deputies of the Kingdom of Italy
- In office 28 April 1934 – 10 February 1938
- Prefect of Enna
- In office 10 February 1938 – 5 June 1940
- Prefect of Foggia
- In office 5 June 1940 – 1 February 1943
- Prefect of Ferrara
- In office 1 February 1943 – 1 September 1943

Private Secretary of the Duce
- In office 6 October 1943 – 28 March 1944
- Leader: Benito Mussolini

Personal details
- Born: 26 November 1902 San Pietro Val d'Astico, Kingdom of Italy
- Died: 7 December 1968 (aged 66) Rome, Italy
- Party: National Fascist Party; Republican Fascist Party

Military service
- Allegiance: Kingdom of Italy
- Branch/service: MVSN
- Rank: Major
- Unit: 4th Blackshirt Division 3 Gennaio
- Battles/wars: Second Italo-Ethiopian War
- Awards: Bronze Medal of Military Valor

Giovanni Dolfin (San Pietro Val d'Astico, 26 November 1902 – Rome, 7 December 1968) was an Italian Fascist politician and civil servant, member of the Italian Chamber of Deputies from 1934 to 1938 and private secretary of Benito Mussolini during the first five months of the Italian Social Republic.

== Biography ==
Born in the Venetian province of Vicenza, he was a squadrista in the early 1920s, joining the National Fascist Party (PNF) in 1921 and participating in the march on Rome in 1922. He was later appointed deputy federal secretary of the Vicenza section of the PNF, graduating in law in 1928 and becoming secretary of the local PNF section in 1930. In 1931 he was part of the directorate of the PNF for a year, while also joining the MVSN. In 1935 he volunteered for the war in Ethiopia, where he fought with the rank of centurione (captain) in the 4th Blackshirt Division 3 Gennaio, being awarded a Bronze Medal of Military Valor. He was later promoted to seniore (Major). From 1934 to 1938 he was a member of the metallurgical and mechanical corporation and of the Chamber of Deputies of the Kingdom of Italy, but he resigned from this post when he was appointed prefect of Enna on 10 February 1938. He subsequently became prefect of Foggia (from 5 June 1940 to 1 February 1943) and of Ferrara (from 1 February to 1 September 1943). During his tenure as prefect of Foggia, in August 1942 he led the crackdown on an anti-war protest by the women of Monteleone di Puglia, who had stormed and occupied the village's town hall and Carabinieri barracks in protest against the regime and the war; ninety-six people were arrested during the subsequent repression, of whom two died in prison and ninety-one were only released after the arrival of the Allies in October 1943.

After the armistice of Cassibile he joined the Italian Social Republic, becoming Guido Buffarini Guidi's right-hand man in Rome; it was Buffarini Guidi who chose him as personal secretary of Benito Mussolini on 6 October 1943, a post he held until 28 March 1944. He was among the first to meet Mussolini when he returned to Italy after his liberation in the Gran Sasso raid and his subsequent brief stay in Germany, remarking in his memoirs that he looked "…aged, tired. I am struck by his pallor and by his thinness, his shaved, shiny skull is furrowed with purple, livid veins. He is sloppy, unkempt. I observe a stain of grease on his collar (…). The slack of the black shirt reveals his neck and increases his thinness". As personal secretary of Mussolini, Dolfin soon became one of his main confidants during the early stages of the RSI, receiving the dictator's reflections on his personal and political situation and on matters such as the fate of Galeazzo Ciano during the Verona Trial. Resented by other Fascist leaders and by the Germans for his influence on Mussolini, Dolfin was joined by Vittorio Mussolini as adjunct secretary, and later replaced altogether in March 1944. He then became general director of General Affairs at the Ministry of Foreign Affairs from 5 April to 20 July 1944, and finally commissioner for the postgraduate institutes of Milan from 29 November 1944. In 1949 he published his diary about the period spent as Mussolini's personal secretary. He died in Rome in 1968.
