= Villanova del Battista =

- Comune
- Comune di Villanova del Battista
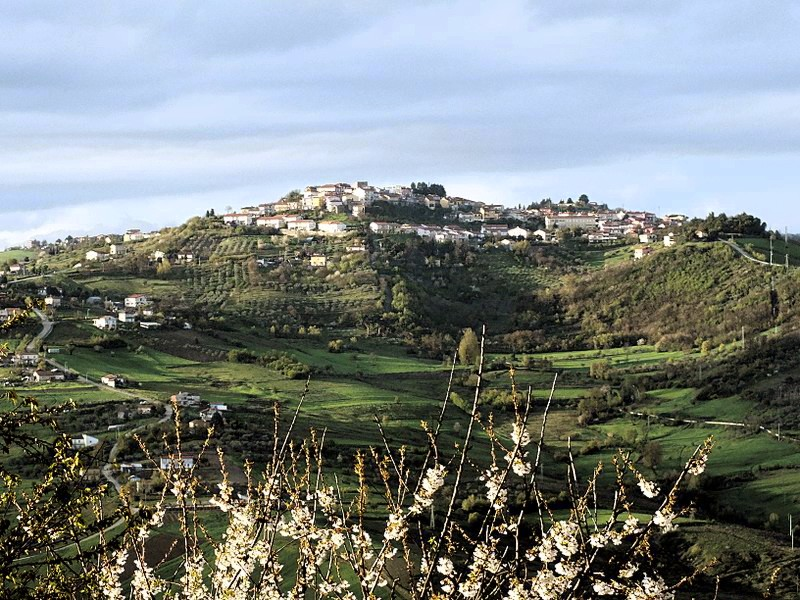

- Location within Italy Location within Campania
- Coordinates: 41°7′N 15°10′E
- Country: Italy
- Region: Campania
- Province: Avellino (AV)

Government
  - Mayor: Ernesto Iorizzo

Area
  - Total: 20 km^{2} (7.7 sq mi)
- Elevation: 742 m (2,434 ft)

Population (31 December 2017)
  - Total: 1,619
  - Density: 81/km^{2} (210/sq mi)
- Demonym: Villanovesi
- Time zone: UTC+1 (CET)
  - Summer (DST): UTC+2 (CEST)
- Postal code: 83030
- Dialing code: 0825
- Patron saint: Saint John the Baptist
- Website: Official website

Villanova del Battista is a town and comune in the province of Avellino, Campania, southern Italy.

Located in Irpinia historical district between the Ufita Valley and Daunian Mountains, the town is part of the Roman Catholic Diocese of Ariano Irpino-Lacedonia. Its territory borders the municipalities of Ariano Irpino, Flumeri, and Zungoli.
