= Frigento =

- Comune
- Comune di Frigento
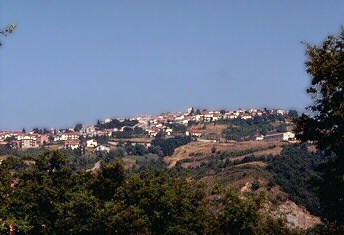

- Location within Italy Location within Campania
- Coordinates: 41°0′44″N 15°6′2″E
- Country: Italy
- Region: Campania
- Province: Avellino (AV)
- Frazioni: Pila ai Piani, Pagliara

Government
  - Mayor: Carmine Ciullo

Area
  - Total: 38.04 km^{2} (14.69 sq mi)
- Elevation: 911 m (2,989 ft)

Population (31 August 2017)
  - Total: 3,682
  - Density: 96.79/km^{2} (250.7/sq mi)
- Demonym: Frigentini
- Time zone: UTC+1 (CET)
  - Summer (DST): UTC+2 (CEST)
- Postal code: 83040
- Dialing code: 0825
- Patron saint: St. Marcian
- Saint day: 14 June
- Website: Official website

Frigento is a town and comune in the province of Avellino, Campania, Italy. It is located in the Ansanto valley and bordered by the municipalities of Carife, Flumeri, Gesualdo, Grottaminarda, Guardia Lombardi, Rocca San Felice, Sturno, and Villamaina. It is one of I Borghi più belli d'Italia ("The most beautiful villages of Italy"). Its name derives from the Latin word frequentia ("frequency").
