= Melito Irpino =

- Comune
- Comune di Melito Irpino
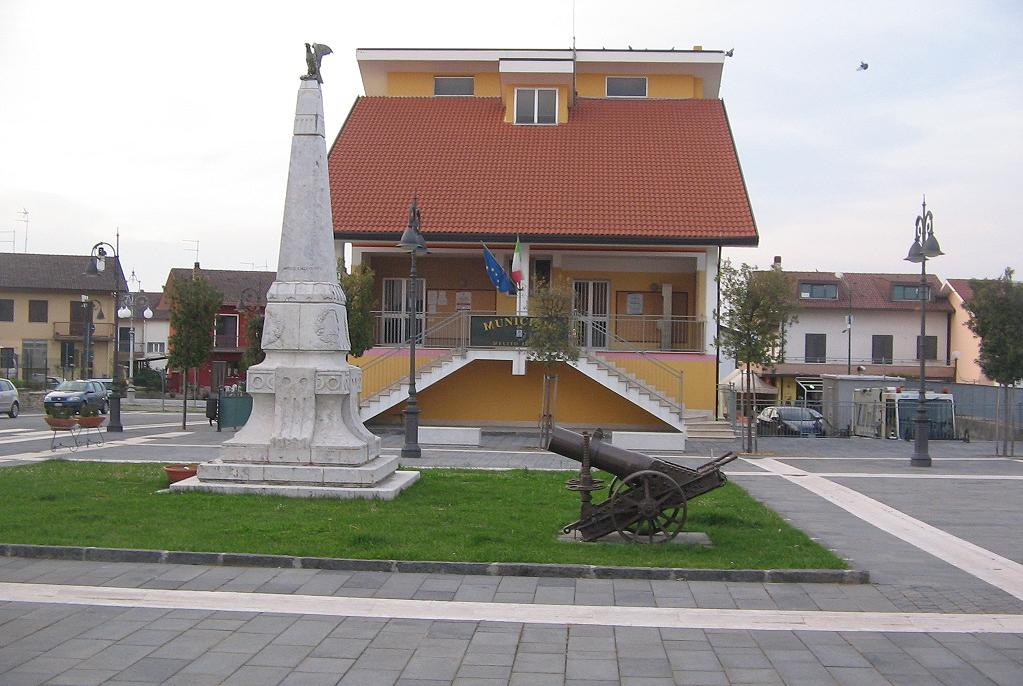
- Melito town hall

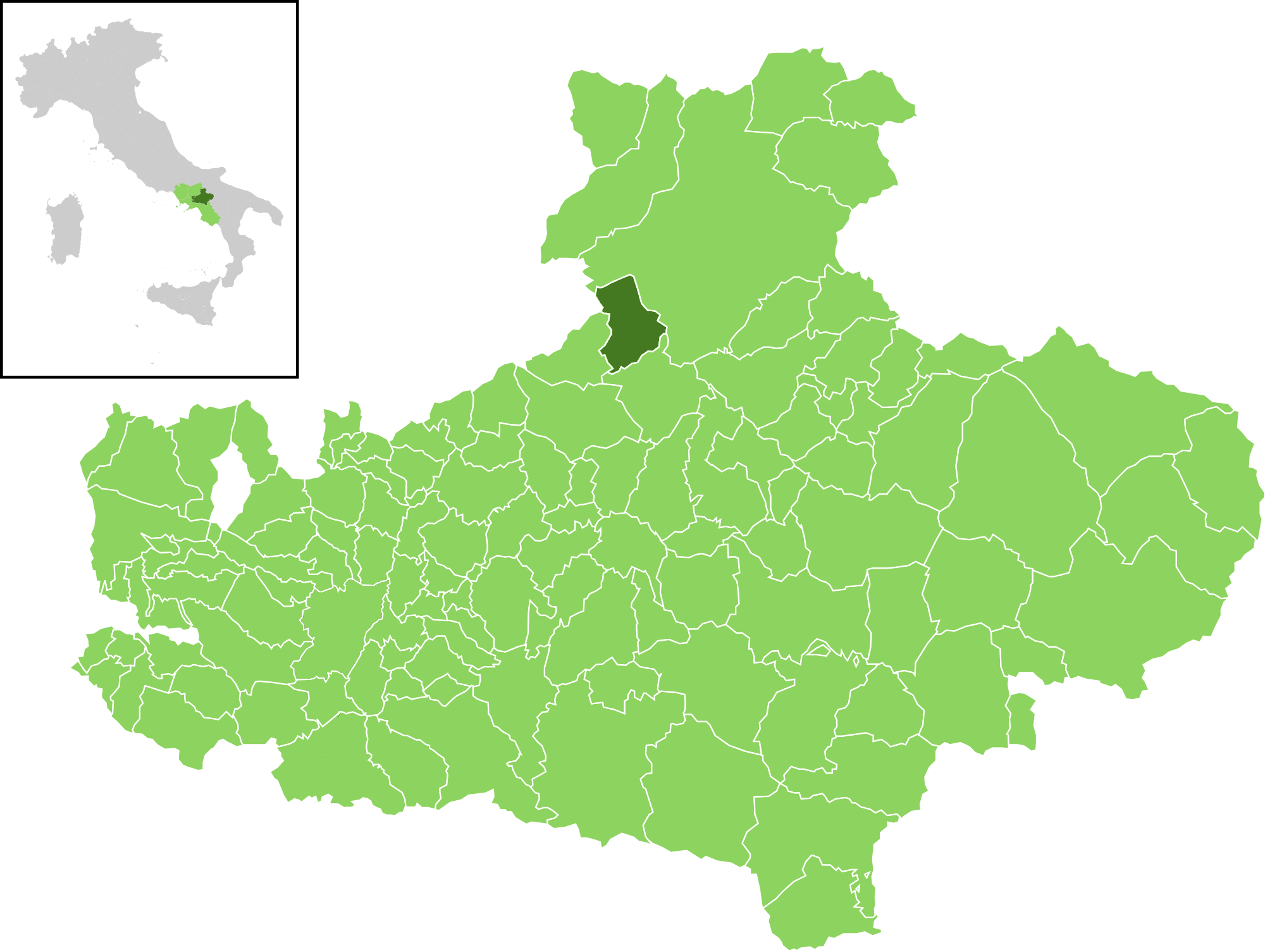
- Melito Irpino within the Province of Avellino

- Location within Italy Location within Campania
- Coordinates: 41°6′15″N 15°3′12″E
- Country: Italy
- Region: Campania
- Province: Avellino (AV)
- Frazioni: Cozza, Fontana del Bosco, Incoronata

Area
  - Total: 20.68 km^{2} (7.98 sq mi)
- Elevation: 461 m (1,512 ft)

Population (31 December 2017)
  - Total: 1,927
  - Density: 93.18/km^{2} (241.3/sq mi)
- Demonym: Melitese
- Time zone: UTC+1 (CET)
  - Summer (DST): UTC+2 (CEST)
- Postal code: 83030
- Dialing code: 0825
- Patron saint: Saint Giles
- Saint day: 1 September
- Website: Official website

Melito Irpino (Irpino: Militë) is a town and comune in the province of Avellino, in the Campania region of south-western Italy.

== History ==
The remains of the ancient Melito were found in 1880. According to some theories, it could be a suburban village belonging to Aeclanum, but the prevailing theory suggests that it was the ancient village of Melae (or Melas). In Ab Urbe Condita (book XXIV, chapter X), Titus Livius wrote that Melae was destroyed in 215 BC by the troops of Claudius Marcellus and Quintus Fabius, during the Second Punic War.

== Geography ==
The municipality is located in the northern area of its province, next to that of Benevento. Crossed by the river Ufita, it borders with Apice, Ariano Irpino, Bonito and Grottaminarda. Its hamlets (frazioni) are the small villages of Cozza, Fontana del Bosco and Incoronata.

The town, included in the Roman Catholic Diocese of Ariano Irpino-Lacedonia, is 5 km far from Grottaminarda, 9 from Ariano Irpino, 30 from Benevento and 48 from Avellino. Nearest motorway exit is located in Grottaminarda, on the A16 Naples-Bari.

== Main sights ==
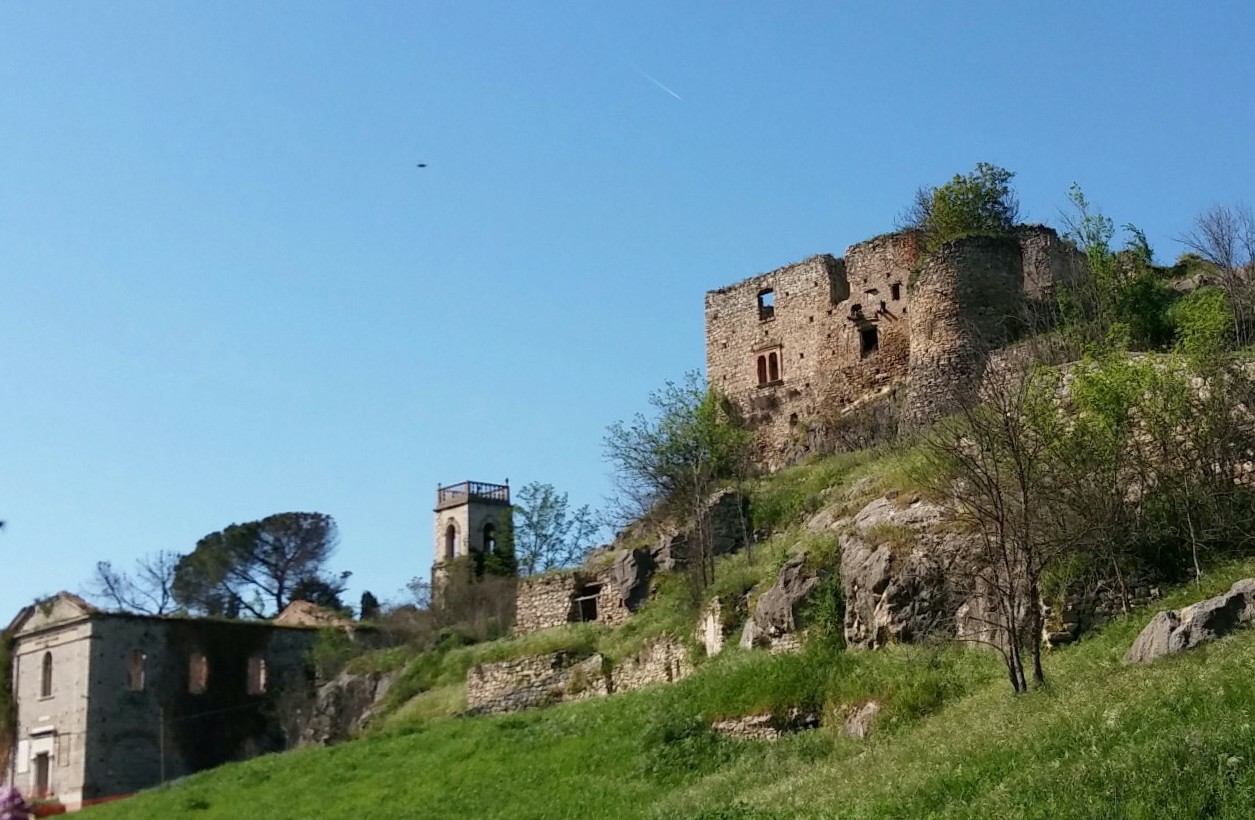
The medieval town

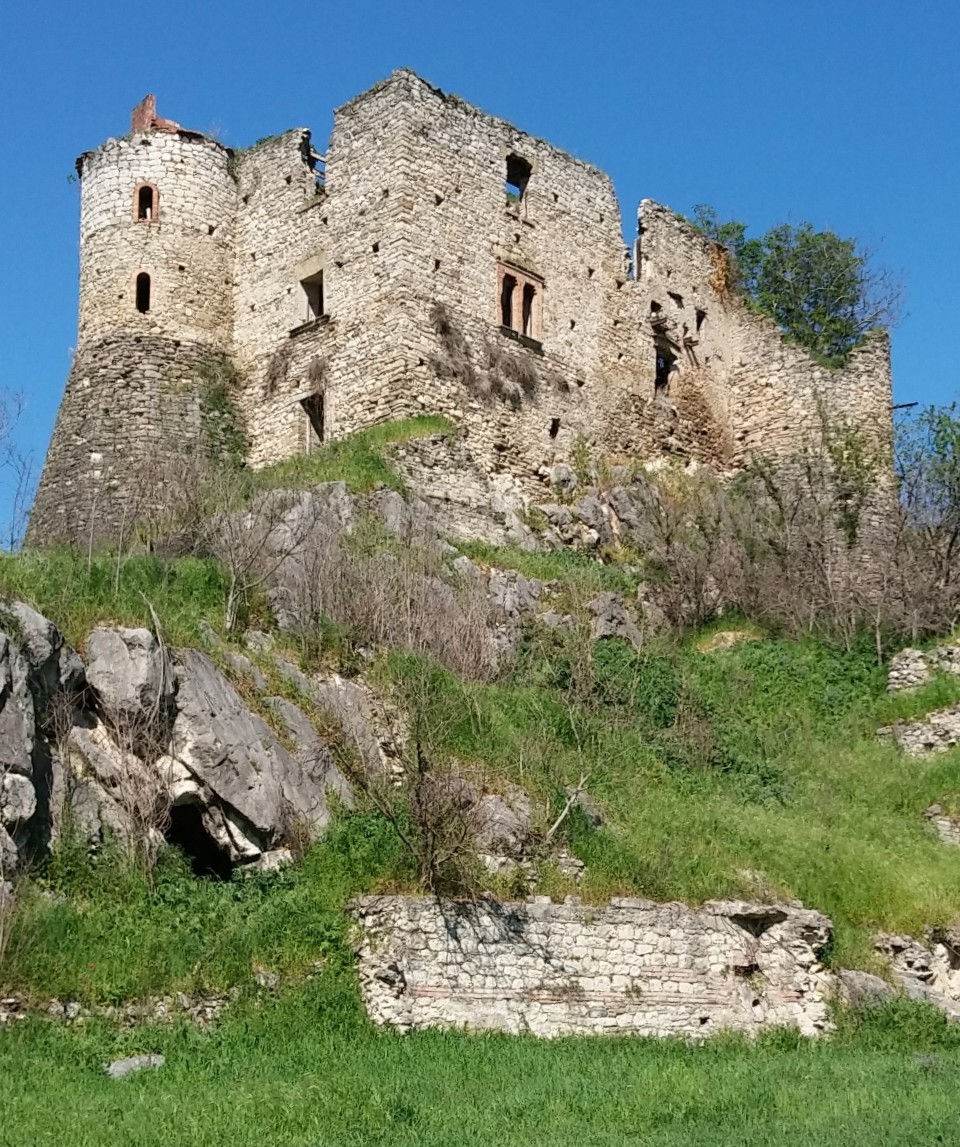
The castle

- The medieval old town, damaged by the 1962 Irpinia earthquake and then abandoned.
- The medieval castle in the old town.

== People ==
- Raffaele Minichiello (b. 1949), the first transatlantic hijacker
- Tonino Sorrentino (b. 1985), footballer
