= Fair Share Health Care Act =

Maryland state legislative act

Maryland Senate Bill 790, known as the Fair Share Health Care Act, also nicknamed the "Wal-Mart Bill", was a legislative act passed in the state of Maryland in 2005. The act would have required for-profit employers with more than 10,000 workers in the state of Maryland to spend at least 8% of their payroll on employee health benefits or make a contribution to the state's insurance program for the poor. Non-profit employers were required to do the same, but with a lower, 6% benchmark.

The Maryland legislature initially passed the bill on April 5, 2005. Though its supporters contended that it did not single out Wal-Mart, Wal-Mart was the only private, for-profit employer in the state that would have been affected.

The bill was vetoed by then-Governor Robert L. Ehrlich On January 12, 2006, the Senate decided to override Ehrlich's veto, thereby passing the act into law.

On July 18, 2006, federal judge J. Frederick Motz struck down the law as preempted by ERISA. On January 17, 2007, the United States Court of Appeals for the Fourth Circuit upheld the decision.

== Similar measures ==
While the Maryland bill drew the most national media attention, similar measures were considered in other states but also failed.

In February 2006, a version of the bill that would have required companies with 5,000 or more employees to spend 9% of their payroll on health care benefits was defeated in Washington.

In June of the same year, a similar bill was vetoed by the governor of Colorado.
