= Castel Baronia =

Town in Avellino, Campania, Italy

Coordinates: 41°03′N 15°11′E

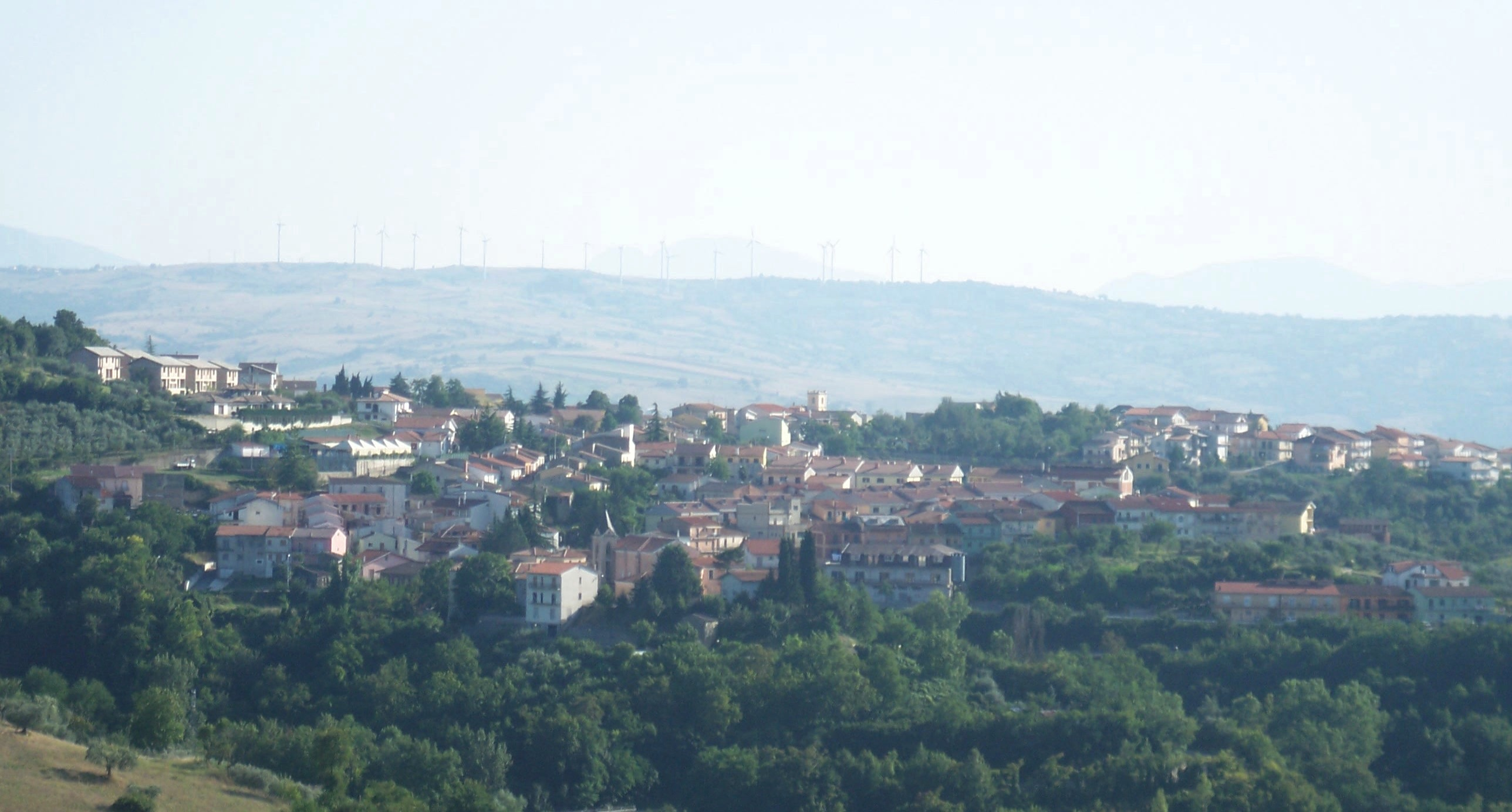
Castel Baronia

Castel Baronia is a town (comune) in the province of Avellino, Campania, Italy.

Castel Baronia has a population of 1,233 inhabitants (Castellesi) and a surface of 15.3 square kilometers thus showing a population density of 80.59 inhabitants per square kilometer. It rises 639 metres above the sea level. Castel Baronia is situated in the green area that extends from the Ufita valley to the province of Foggia, a gracious area, forming part of the Comunita' Montana of the Ufita Valley.

The name of the town comes from the word Castello (from the latin Castellum) due to the existence from the norman era, of an impenetrable fort in the highest part of the area, from which the town and surrounding areas were dominated. The word Baronia was added when the district entered under the jurisdiction of the Baronia di Vico. Hence, Castel Baronia. The first mention of this town dates back to the second half of the 11th century when a certain Gradilione, nephew of the norman, Roberto di Guiscardo, owned the lands of Vico. In 1122 the owner of this Castle was Riccardo de Formari, killed during the battle of Flumeri.

Castel Baronia has touristic importance formed by its history and archaeological neolithic finds which date back to the 3rd century B.C. in part these have been discovered in the Isca del Pero area, where huts, tombs and industrial clay items with characteristics of the Laterza culture. The second half of the 5th century B.C. other very important finds also include tombs that were discovered in the Serra San Marco region, where 130 tombs were discovered. Studies have demonstrated that the contents of these tombs proved the presence of inhabitants whose economy was based on agriculture and craftsmanship, influenced by the progressed civilizations of the central Adriatic coastal areas. In the Medieval period evidence has shown that the primitive inhabitants occupied the "Acquara" area due to the presence of springs.

This little jewel has endured over the centuries many catastrophic episodes. In 1350, it was destroyed by the bandit Mariotto, ordered by the feudal of Sant'Angelo dei Lombardi and the new Castel Baronia was rebuilt in the area of the sanctuary of S.Maria delle Fratte, where according to tradition a shepherd discovered a byzantine painting representing the Madonna, still today fervently venerated. This small feudal area constituted one of the important defensive points of the Baronia di Vico. It was the property of the Del Balzo Orsini, D'Acquino, De Ponte and Caracciolo Families. Affected also by the numerous earthquakes to which the Irpinia area is particularly subject, many architectural buildings have been destroyed. However, the church of Santo Spirito of the Baroque period with its annexed Franciscan convent within which there is a stunning 16th century cloister surrounded by porticos with rare and precious parietal wall paintings, to be seen for their beauty. Also to be found are lined 17th century sculptures representing Saint Peter, Saint Teresa and Saint Francis and Paintings by the artist Lanfranco together with two gold wood alters dated 1740.

Also, miraculously conserved is the house of the famous 18th-century poet and jurist Pasquale Stanislao Mancini. Still to be admired are the remains of the Benedictine church of Saint Giovanni. The church of Saint Francis dates back to 1630 and conserves 17th-century statues, whilst the Sanctuary of Santa Maria delle Fratte dates back to the 12th century and has been rebuilt numerous times due to the destruction by earthquake phenomena. The patron Saint Maria is celebrated on 2 February, and other dates to remember are Saint Anne 26 July and Saint Anthony 13 June.

Few people know that Castel Baronia invented its own conventional language called "Ciaschino", created by the craftsmen and merchants of buttons and combs made from horns, a craft to which Castellesi were famous. This language it is said, was used during the war to pass information from one family to another without being understood by any one except Castellesi. This town has over the years been emptied by immigration, but in occasion of the summer festivities, there returns a great presence of Castellesi from around the world who return here for their holidays. Typical cuisine of this town includes but is not limited to home made salami of various types, cheese for grating on pasta, ricotta, cured lard and more. For cooked dishes all ingredients fresh and strictly home made "Cravaiuoli" Ravioli with ricotta, "La'ine" tagliatelli with tomato salsa, "Mmenesta Mmaretata" greens marinated and cooked with pork bones and rind, Cakes or sweets like "Castagnaccio" pastry stuffed with chestnut puree sugar cacao and liquor and "Pizza cu la ricotta" Flan of ricotta sugar and cinnamon.

The region produces extra virgin olive oil from local olive plantations alongside a variety of vine grapes. Additionally, Castel Baronia has a local tradition of crochet work practiced by resident artisans.
