= Trevico =

- Comune
- Comune di Trevico
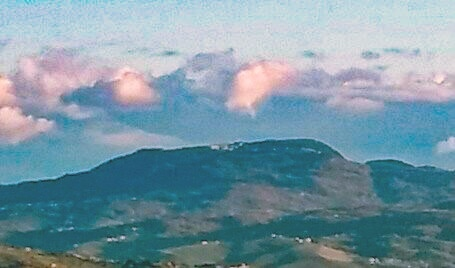
- Trevico viewed from Ariano Irpino

- Location within Italy Location within Campania
- Coordinates: 41°02′55″N 15°14′01″E
- Country: Italy
- Region: Campania
- Province: Avellino (AV)
- Frazioni: Caprareccia, Farullo, Molini, Santa Lucia, Santa Marena, San Vito, Vecito

Government
  - Mayor: Nicolino Rossi

Area
  - Total: 11 km^{2} (4.2 sq mi)
- Elevation: 1,090 m (3,580 ft)

Population (31 December 2017)
  - Total: 932
  - Density: 85/km^{2} (220/sq mi)
- Demonym: Trevicani
- Time zone: UTC+1 (CET)
  - Summer (DST): UTC+2 (CEST)
- Postal code: 83058
- Dialing code: 0827
- Patron saint: St. Euplius
- Saint day: 12 August
- Website: Official website

Trevico is a town and comune in the province of Avellino, Campania, southern Italy.

Located in the Apennines upon a steep hill at 3,576 feet (1,090 m) altitude, Trevico is the highest inhabited place in Campania. Its main produce are hams, chestnuts and potatoes, each of them is awarded PAT quality mark.

The town is part of the Roman Catholic Diocese of Ariano Irpino-Lacedonia and its territory borders with the municipalities of Carife, Castel Baronia, San Nicola Baronia, San Sossio Baronia, Scampitella, Vallata, and Vallesaccarda.

== Climate ==
Trevico has an oceanic climate (Köppen: Cfb) with cold winters, mild summers, and evenly spread precipitation throughout the year.

Climate data for Trevico (1991–2020)
Month	Jan	Feb	Mar	Apr	May	Jun	Jul	Aug	Sep	Oct	Nov	Dec	Year
Record high °C (°F)	17.0 (62.6)	17.2 (63.0)	20.6 (69.1)	26.0 (78.8)	30.6 (87.1)	33.0 (91.4)	32.4 (90.3)	35.4 (95.7)	29.2 (84.6)	25.4 (77.7)	24.2 (75.6)	16.0 (60.8)	35.4 (95.7)
Mean daily maximum °C (°F)	4.3 (39.7)	4.6 (40.3)	7.7 (45.9)	11.1 (52.0)	15.9 (60.6)	20.7 (69.3)	23.5 (74.3)	24.1 (75.4)	18.5 (65.3)	14.4 (57.9)	9.5 (49.1)	5.3 (41.5)	13.3 (55.9)
Daily mean °C (°F)	2.3 (36.1)	2.2 (36.0)	4.7 (40.5)	7.8 (46.0)	12.3 (54.1)	16.8 (62.2)	19.4 (66.9)	20.0 (68.0)	15.2 (59.4)	11.7 (53.1)	7.2 (45.0)	3.4 (38.1)	10.3 (50.5)
Mean daily minimum °C (°F)	0.3 (32.5)	0.0 (32.0)	2.1 (35.8)	4.9 (40.8)	8.9 (48.0)	13.2 (55.8)	15.6 (60.1)	16.4 (61.5)	12.2 (54.0)	9.2 (48.6)	5.2 (41.4)	1.5 (34.7)	7.5 (45.5)
Record low °C (°F)	−11.0 (12.2)	−10.0 (14.0)	−10.2 (13.6)	−8.2 (17.2)	0.6 (33.1)	0.0 (32.0)	0.0 (32.0)	8.4 (47.1)	0.8 (33.4)	−2.0 (28.4)	−6.0 (21.2)	−9.4 (15.1)	−11.0 (12.2)
Average precipitation mm (inches)	50.12 (1.97)	43.38 (1.71)	46.76 (1.84)	50.29 (1.98)	55.24 (2.17)	39.44 (1.55)	44.86 (1.77)	36.30 (1.43)	61.43 (2.42)	49.17 (1.94)	65.33 (2.57)	55.31 (2.18)	597.63 (23.53)
Average precipitation days (≥ 1.0 mm)	8.18	7.46	7.29	8.75	7.25	4.93	4.68	4.32	6.64	6.63	8.56	8.04	82.73
Average snowy days	6.61	5.30	3.87	0.87	0.04	0	0	0	0	0.17	1.04	3.92	21.82
Average relative humidity (%)	81.20	79.58	75.91	72.19	71.50	66.14	63.23	62.77	71.93	76.34	79.93	81.39	73.51
Average dew point °C (°F)	−0.54 (31.03)	−1.09 (30.04)	0.61 (33.10)	2.58 (36.64)	6.76 (44.17)	9.42 (48.96)	10.71 (51.28)	11.06 (51.91)	9.57 (49.23)	7.31 (45.16)	4.01 (39.22)	0.60 (33.08)	5.08 (41.14)
Source: NOAA

== People ==
- Rosa Giannetta, journalist and a professor of sociology
- Vincent DeMarco, President of the Maryland Citizens' Health Initiative

== See also ==
- Trivicum
