= Ufita =

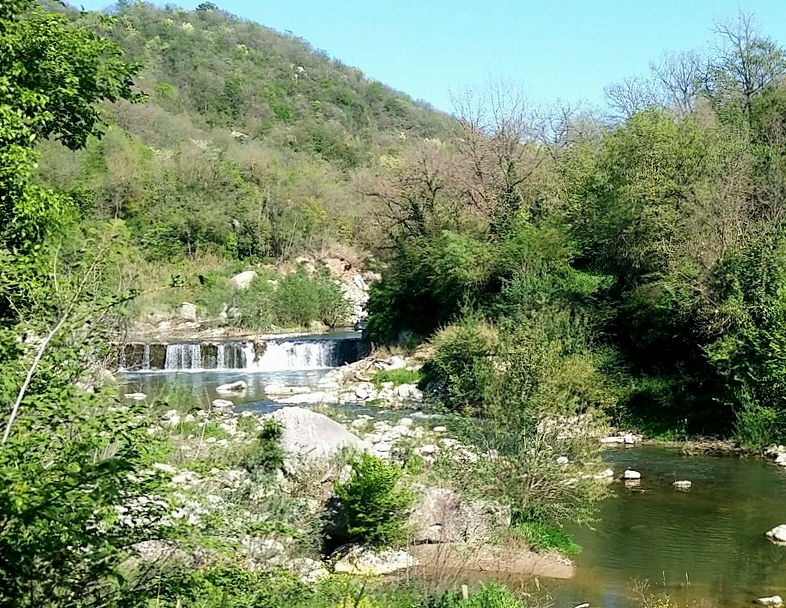
- The Ufita near Melito Irpino.

Location
- Country: Italy

Physical characteristics
- Source
  - elevation: 900 m
- Mouth: Calore Irpino
  - coordinates: 41°08′12″N 14°55′26″E
- Length: 49 km (30 mi)
- Basin size: 479 km^{2} (185 sq mi)

Basin features
- Progression: Calore Irpino→ Volturno→ Tyrrhenian Sea

The Ufita is a river of Campania, in southern Italy. The source is in the Baronia traditional sub-region of Irpinia, in the province of Avellino, after which the river flows generally north-westwards, entering the province of Benevento before entering the Calore Irpino in the territory of Sant'Arcangelo Trimonte.
