= List of earthquakes in Irpinia =

This is a list of earthquakes that have occurred in the Italian seismic district of Irpinia since the 15th century. It comprises all of the significant earthquakes whose epicenter was located in Irpinia, not those whose epicenter was outside the area, but may have still have an effect on it. The death toll includes the total number of deaths as a result of the earthquake, not only those that occurred in Irpinia.

== Earthquakes ==
Date	Name	Epicenter	Magnitude	Deaths	Ref.
December 5, 1456	1456 Central Italy earthquakes	Unknown	7.4 M_{w}	30,000–40,000	
January 15, 1466	1466 Irpinia earthquake	South of the Sella di Conza pass in Monti Eremita – Marzano in the southern Apennines	6.5 M_{w}	Hundreds	
March 29, 1517	1517 Irpinia earthquake	Between the Formicoso plateau and Baronia	5.4 M_{L}	26+	
September 8, 1694	1694 Irpinia–Basilicata earthquake	Head of the Ofanto River	6.87 M_{L}	6,000	
March 14, 1702	1702 Irpinia–Benevento earthquake	Middle of the Calore valley, east of Benevento	4.9 M_{L}	400	
November 29, 1732	1732 Irpinia earthquake	Grottaminarda	6.6 M_{w}	Thousands	
April 9, 1853	1853 Irpinia earthquake	Near the Sele in southern Irpinia	5.6 M_{L}	Around 12	
June 7, 1910	1910 Irpinia earthquake	Calitri	5.7 M_{L}	50	
July 23, 1930	1930 Irpinia earthquake	Between Lacedonia and Bisaccia	6.7 M_{w}	1404	
August 21, 1962	1962 Irpinia earthquake	Between Valle del Miscano and the Ufita River in northern Irpinia	6.1 M_{L}	17	
November 23, 1980	1980 Irpinia earthquake	Upper Sele Valley	6.9 M_{w}	2,914	

== See also ==
- List of earthquakes in Italy
- List of historical earthquakes
