= Carpignano, Grottaminarda =

Carpignano
- Frazione
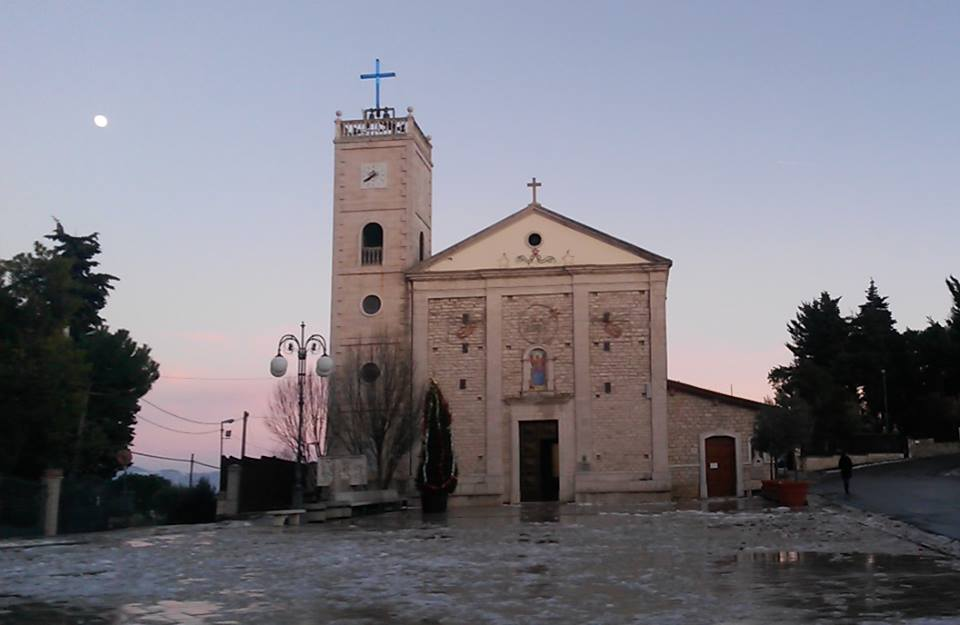
- The Sanctuary of Carpignano

- Location of Carpignano in Italy
- Coordinates: 41°02′16.3″N 15°03′11.4″E
- Country: Italy
- Region: Campania
- Province: Avellino (AV)
- Comune: Grottaminarda
- Elevation: 612 m (2,008 ft)

Population (2011)
  - Total: 219
- Demonym: Carpignanesi
- Time zone: UTC+1 (CET)
  - Summer (DST): UTC+2 (CEST)
- Postal code: 83035
- Dialing code: (+39) 0825
- Patron saint: Holy Mary of Carpignano
- Website: Official website

Carpignano is a southern Italian village and hamlet (frazione) of Grottaminarda, a municipality in the province of Avellino, Campania. In 2011 it had a population of 219.

== History ==
Village's original name is actually Crispignanus, which refers to native trees called "crisp" or "carp" (Hornbeam in local dialect) which have now gone extinct in the area. Some village elders still use this term; however, it is now becoming obsolete.

Legend holds that Carpignano was once a thick forest where a portrait of a Black Madonna hung on a tree. Neighboring farmers, who had stumbled across the portrait, tried to take the portrait back to their town several times, yet during the night, somehow, the portrait returned to the tree. Thus, the portrait was kept in that spot, upon which a grand sanctuary was built, called the Santuario di Carpignano. The portrait is adorned on the main wall in the church to this day.

== Geography ==
Carpignano is a hill village located in the Ufita Valley, north of Irpinia. It spans on a provincial road linking Grottaminarda (4.5 km north) and Gesualdo (5 km south). It is 6 km from Fontanarosa and the ancient Samnite town of Aeclanum, 6.5 from Frigento, 7 from Sturno, 8 from Mirabella Eclano, 33 from Benevento and 46 from Avellino.

== Main sights ==
The main landmark is a sanctuary ("Santuario di Carpignano"), built in 1910 and located in the central village square, within the diocese of Ariano Irpino-Lacedonia. Other sights are represented by the natural environment that surrounds the village.

== Events ==
Like all other towns in the area, Carpignano has a 3-4 day feast, usually in the first week of September. The feast usually culminates with the performance of a singer or talented artist on the last day of the feast.

== Transport ==
Located between the state highways SS90 and SS303, the village is 4 km far from the motorway exit "Grottaminarda", on the A16 motorway Naples-Bari.
