= 1456 Central Italy earthquakes =

Earthquakes in Italy

- Location within Italy
- Magnitude: M_{w} 7.19–7.4 (December 5) M_{w} 7.0 (December 30)
- Depth: 12–25 km (7.5–15.5 mi)
- Epicenter: 41.302°N 14.711°E
- Areas affected: Kingdom of Naples
- Max. intensity: MMI XI (Extreme)
- Tsunami: Yes
- Casualties: 27,000–70,000 dead

On December 5, 1456, the largest earthquake to occur on the Italian Peninsula in historical times struck the Kingdom of Naples. The earthquake had an estimated moment magnitude of M_{w} 7.19–7.4, and was centred near the town of Pontelandolfo in the present-day Province of Benevento, southern Italy. Earning a level of XI (Extreme) on the Modified Mercalli intensity scale, the earthquake caused widespread destruction in central and southern Italy. Estimates of the death toll range greatly with up to 70,000 deaths reported. It was followed by two strong M_{w} 7.0 and 6.0 earthquakes to the north on December 30. The earthquake sequence is considered the largest in Italian history, and one of the most studied.

== Tectonic setting ==
The central Italian Peninsula is dominated by active extensional tectonics, forming the Apennine Mountains. The mountain range formed during the Miocene and Pliocene due to the subduction of the Adriatic plate beneath the Eurasian plate. The resulting subduction formed a fold and thrust belt. During the Quaternary, thrust tectonics gave way to extensional tectonics, with the development of a zone of normal faulting running along the crest of the mountain range. One explanation is that slab rollback is occurring within the Adriatic plate as it subducts beneath the Tyrrhenian Sea. Another explanation is because the back-arc basin in the Tyrrhenian Sea is opening at a faster rate than the African plate is colliding with the Eurasian plate. Extensional tectonics in the region have been active since the Pliocene epoch, mainly accommodated by northwest–southeast striking normal faults. The faults associated with large earthquakes on the peninsula are geologically young in age, and rarely rupture the surface. Occasionally, strike-slip events like the 1456 sequence, as well as the 1971 (M_{w} 5.0) and 2012 (M_{w} 4.6) moderate earthquakes in the southern Apennine region suggest the dominant style of faulting is not limited to normal dip-slip.

== Earthquakes ==
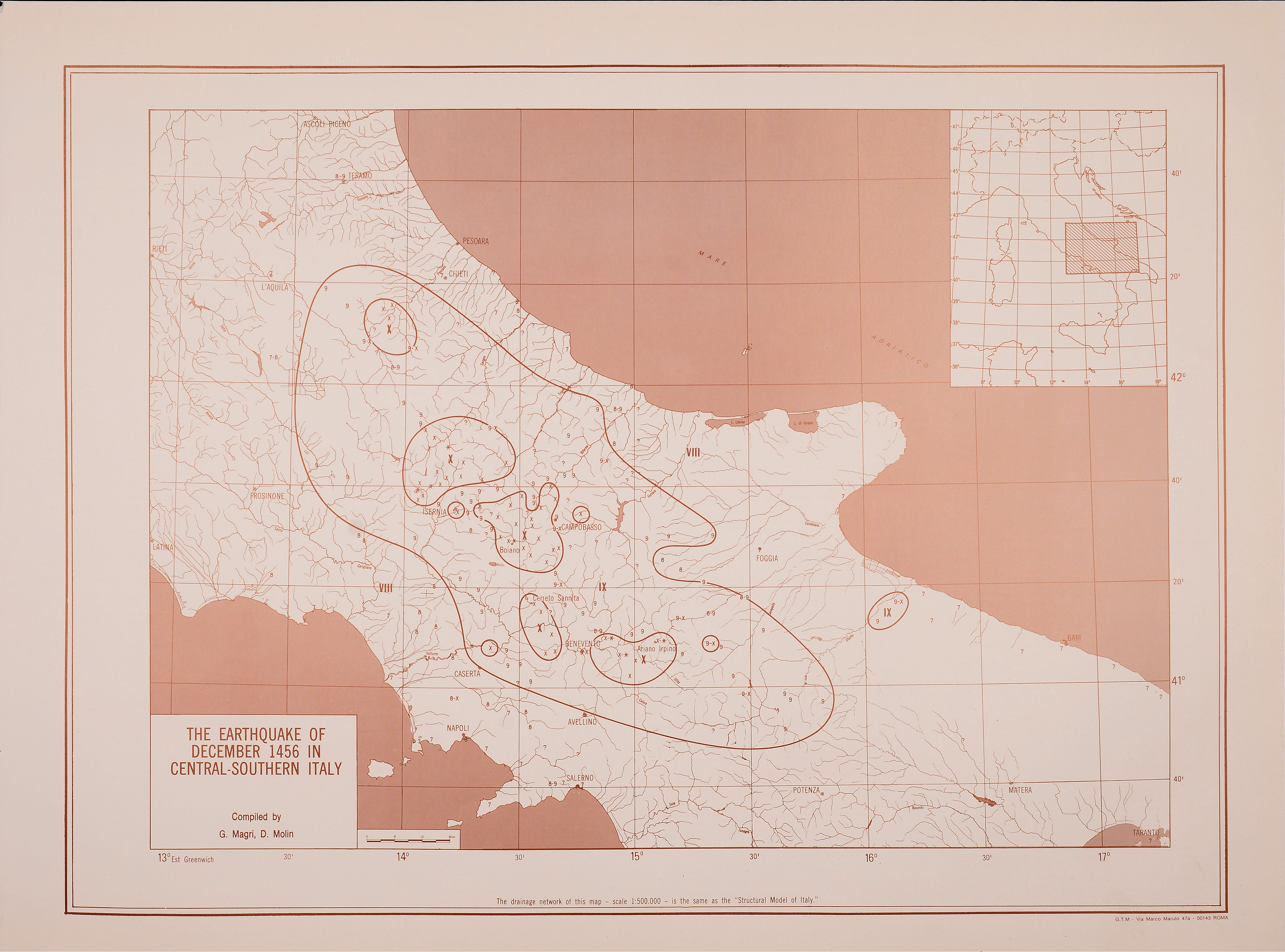
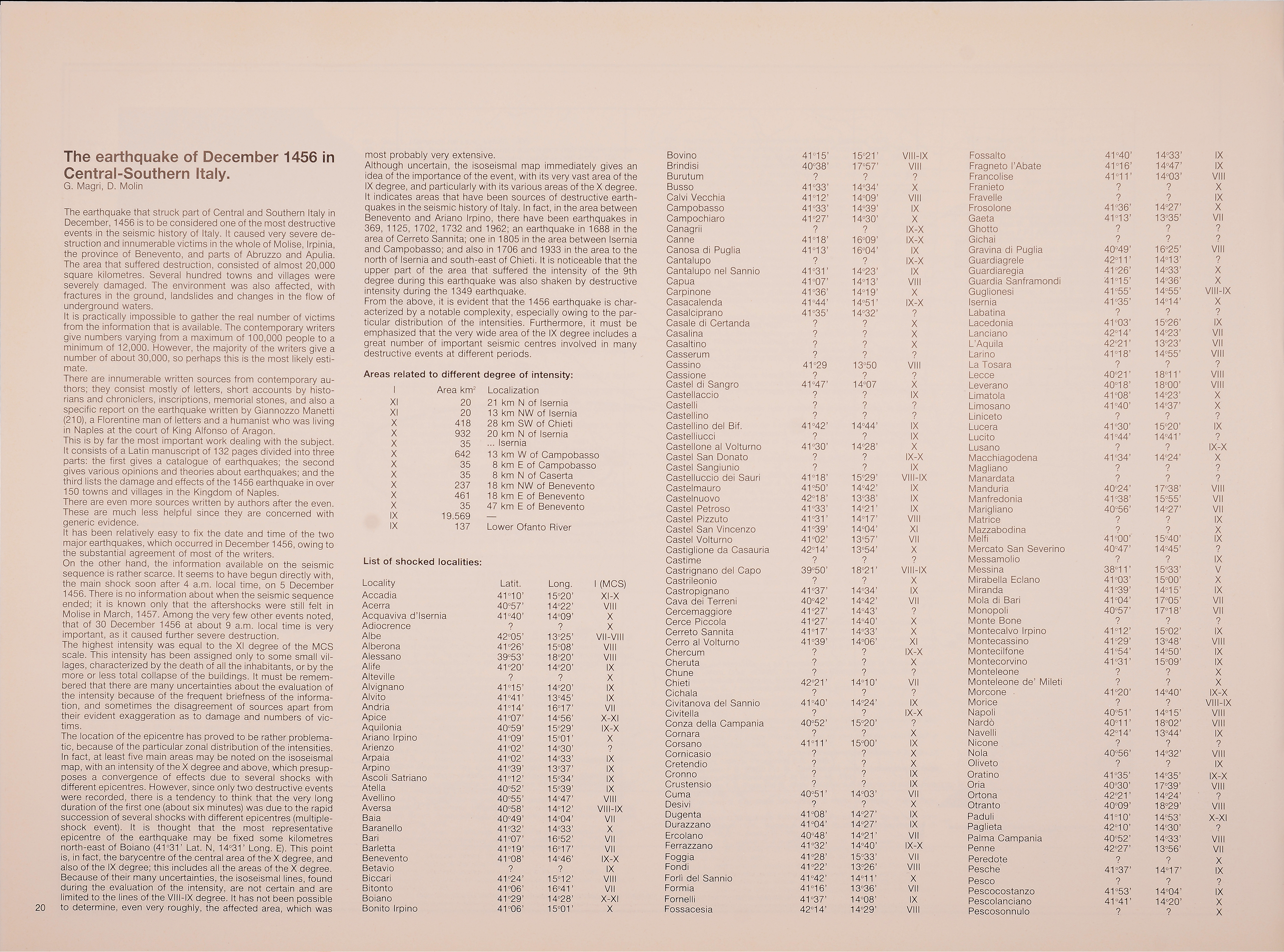
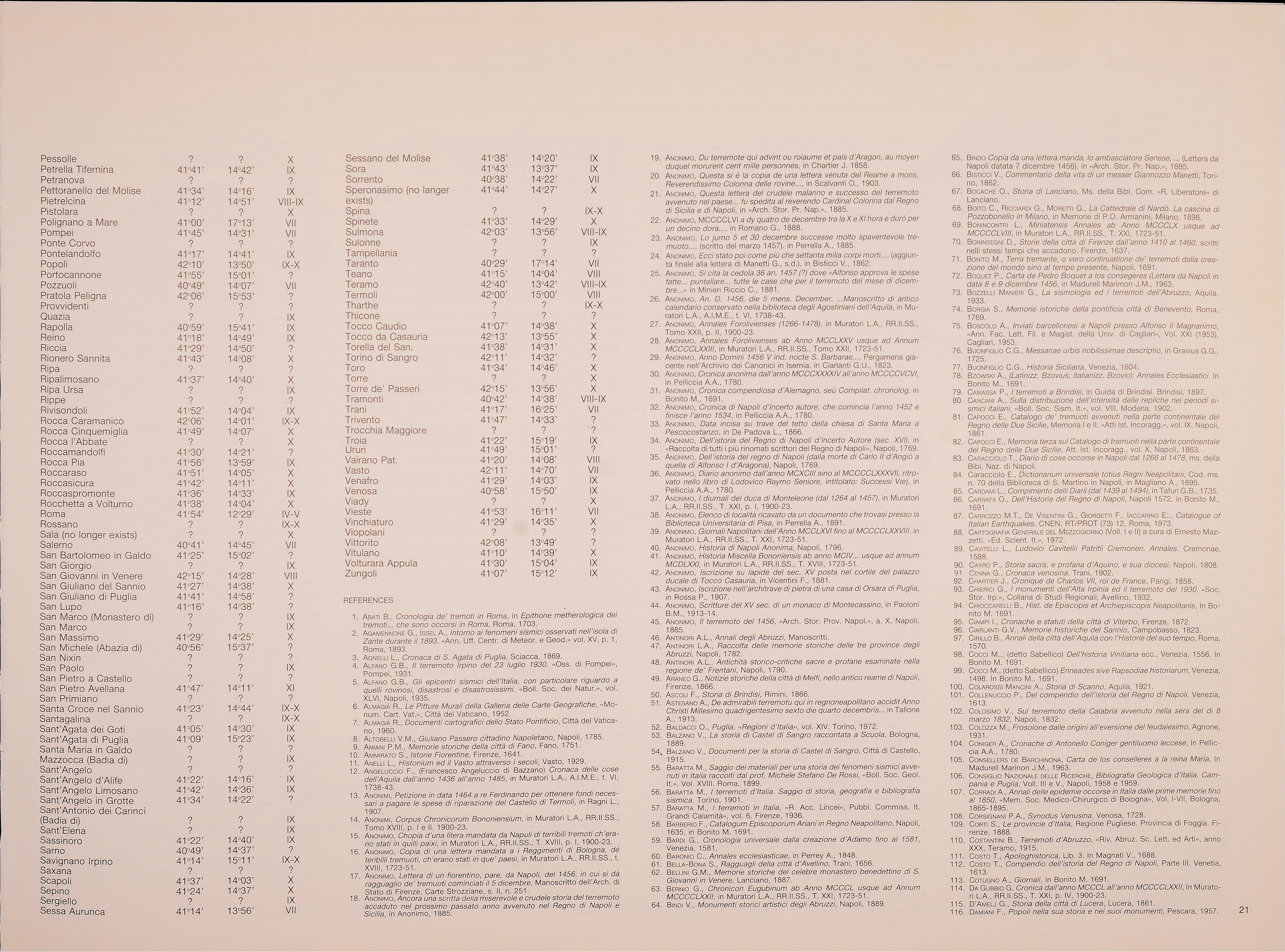
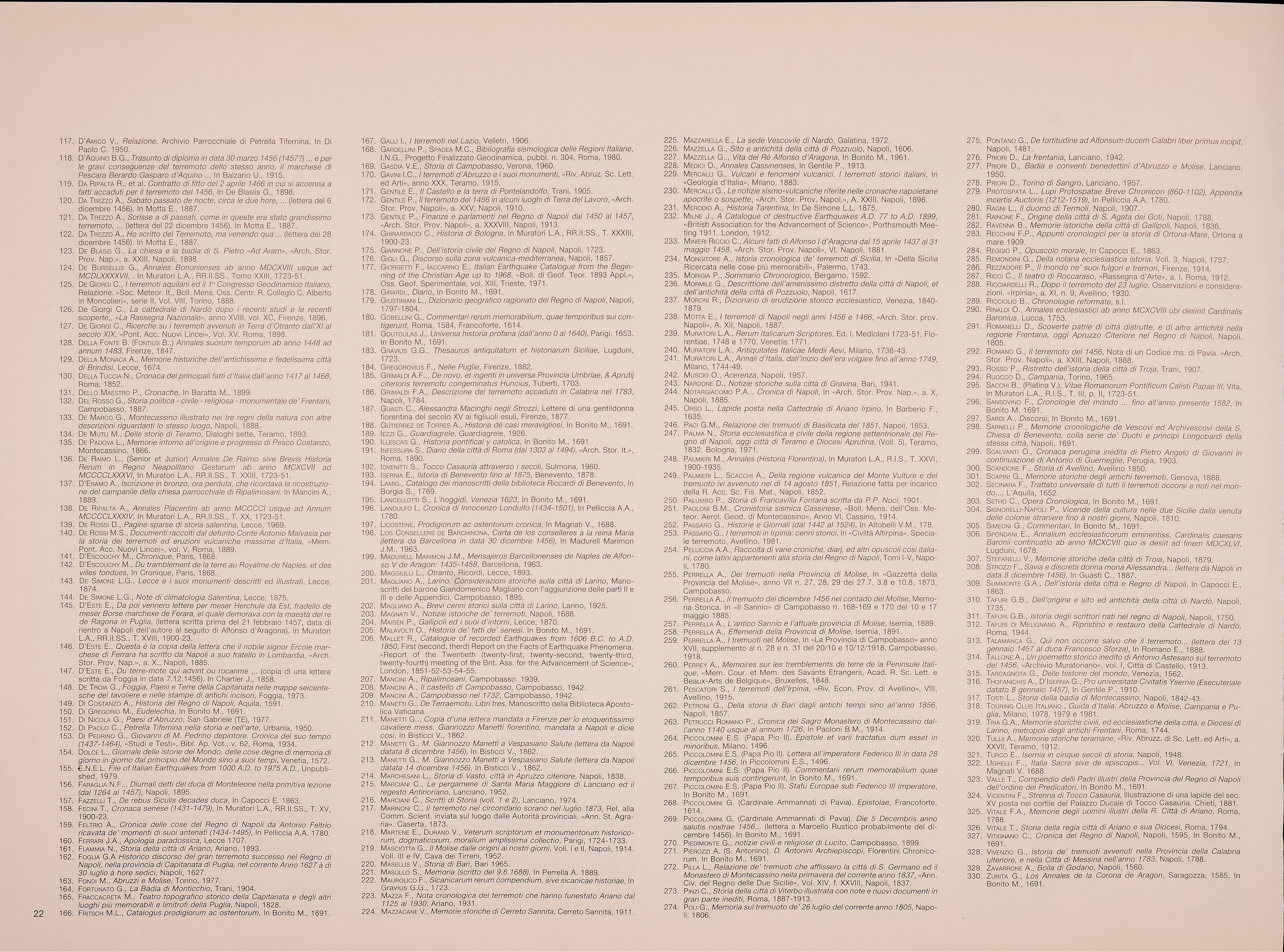
Map and description of the event

The earthquake of December 5 was estimated at M_{w} 7.19 ± 0.1 by the 2014 version of the National Institute of Geophysics and Volcanology earthquake catalog. Its magnitude has been estimated to be as high as M_{w} 7.4. This earthquake occurred in a region of active crustal movement along east–west striking strike-slip faults.

Based on studying the macroseismic effects two hypotheses were postulated; the occurrence of one large mainshock, or three distinct shocks closely-spaced in time. The single-mainshock hypothesis could only be rationalized by a deep event occurring at ~30 km (19 mi) depth. This hypothetical depth would be greater than the average in the Apennines (10–15 km (6.2–9.3 mi)). Northwest-southeast trending normal faults are thought to be the source. Unlike most earthquakes in the area with rupture occurring in the shallow 12 km (7.5 mi) of the crust, the source of the 1456 earthquake was at between 12 km (7.5 mi) and 25 km (16 mi) depth. The 1456 earthquake subsequently triggered future earthquakes nearby due to the behavior of faults in the area.

The second hypothesis suggest three distinct mainshocks with depths of 15.5 km (9.6 mi), 14 km (8.7 mi), and 17.5 km (10.9 mi), respectively. These depths are consistent with the average focal depths of earthquakes in the Apennines. The rupture process involved a complex cascade of independent faults rupturing subsequently; as many as five subevents constituted the mainshock. The earthquake rupture extended from Abruzzo to Irpinia. Another hypothesis suggest the earthquakes were strike-slip events that occurred at a depth of 10–25 km (6.2–15.5 mi). The December 5 event occurred along a west-northwest-east-southeast striking oblique right-lateral fault. It ruptured east of the fault that caused the 1688 Sannio earthquake.

A similar fault located further north, in Matese generated the shock of December 30. In this earthquake, intensity X–XI was felt in a northwest–southeast trending configuration from Macchiagodena to Castelluccio Acquaborrana. It was also felt in an east–west area from Boiano to Cercemaggiore. The widespread distribution of great intensity and its similarities with the December 5 event suggest the December 30 event occurred at a greater depth (>10 km (6.2 mi)). Based on evaluating the reported intensities of the December 30 event, its magnitude is estimated to be no greater than M_{w} 7.2. A third shock was recorded in the area affected by the December 30 event, estimated at M_{w} 6.0. This earthquake was felt VIII–IX over a wide area as well, suggesting a deep focal origin.

== Effects ==
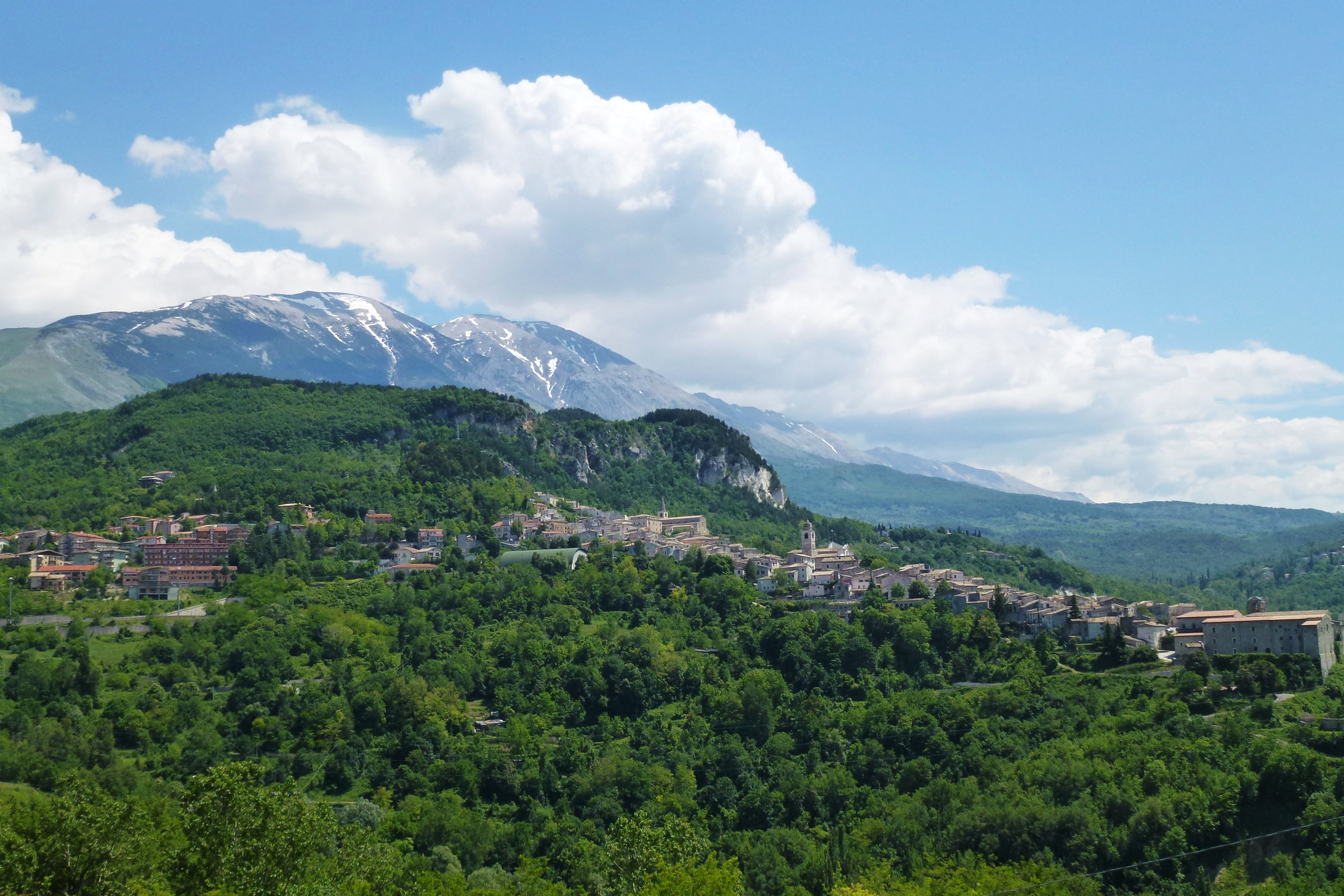
Caramanico Terme experienced a maximum Mercalli intensity of XI

The December 5 shock struck at 23:00 local time, lasting approximately 150 seconds. Devastation was reported in five of the twenty regions of Italy; Abruzzo, Molise, Campania, Apulia, and Basilicata; while some damage occurred in Lazio and Calabria. Weak aftershocks were documented following the December 5 earthquake. Contemporary sources made no distinction between effects of the December 5 and 30 earthquakes. Complete destruction occurred in a zone measuring 6,000 km^{2} (2,300 sq mi). The total area affected was 18,000 km^{2} (6,900 sq mi). The area of devastation was unusually large compared to most earthquakes in Italy; thought to be caused by the occurrence of multiple ruptures.

The meizoseismal area stretched for nearly 180 km (110 mi), assigned X–XI (Extreme), where destruction of structures occurred. The unusually large area of the meizoseismal area is caused by multiple faults, separated by significant distances rupturing. The commune of Caramanico Terme experienced a maximum intensity of XI. Intensity IX–X was felt in the towns of Tocco da Casauria, Torre de' Passeri and Castiglione a Casauria. From the lower Aterno Valley (in the north), to Sulmona, and Navelli (in the southeast), the intensity was VIII–IX. Intensity VIII–IX was felt over an area that was 40 km (25 mi) wide. About 20 km (12 mi) away, the intensity gradually decreased to V.

The earthquake of December 30 (which measured ~M_{w} 7.0) struck at 21:30. It was not as severe in Naples. Regions closer to the epicenter reported serious damage. Documentation of heavy destruction in Samnium and the Campania Plain might be due to conflicting reports of the previous event. Major damage occurred in Isernia. There was no damage in the areas between Castel di Sangro and Sulmona. Additional damage also occurred due to the aftershocks, which persisted until May 1457. Constant aftershocks occurred up till January 1457, and one caused significant damage in Naples between the night of January 8 and 9. Weak but frequent aftershocks continued to February. Three homes in Capua collapsed during an aftershock on 10 February.

Four areas of extreme damage were identified by scientists at the National Institute of Geophysics and Volcanology; in the upper Pescara river valley (Tocco da Casauria, Popoli and Torre de' Passeri); northern Matese (Bojano and Isernia); Samnium and Irpinia; and the Monte Vulture region.

A series of anomalous waves in the Bay of Naples also caused boats to crash. One small boat was completely destroyed though there was no casualty. There were also reports of a tsunami in the Gulf of Taranto, where it struck the Ionian coastline.

== Casualties ==
In the town of Isernia, catastrophic damage occurred; 1,500 residents of the total 2,035 perished. Between 100 and 150 people died in Naples due to many homes and churches collapsing. Another 100 people died in Pozzuoli. There were between 600 and 2,200 fatalities in Apice; 2,000 in Barberio; over 1,000 in Lafino; 1,200 in Isernia; 400 in Cerreto Sannita; and 1,200 in Acerenza. The city of Ariano was razed—between 600 and 2,200 residents perished. A metrical inscription by Bishop Orso Leone placed in the Ariano Cathedral numbered the dead at a thousand. The town was rebuilt by 1470. The towns of Acquaviva, Apice, Biccari, Campobasso and Casalduni suffered massive destruction or were totally destroyed.

Letters written between December 6 and 20 only reported local casualty numbers. In Naples, the death toll ranged between 100 and 150. In some areas, the reported death toll varied greatly, such as in Ariano, where it ranged from 2,000 to 8,000. A mail dated December 18 reported a total death toll of 70,000. Antonio da Trezzo estimated 30,000 deaths while a figure of 60,000 was reported by Jacopo Piccolomini-Ammannati. Far smaller figures were reported by Matteo Dell'Aquila and Giannozzo Manetti at 7,000 and 27,000, respectively. More than 50 percent of residents in Apice, Ariano Irpino, Bojano, Isernia, and Paduli perished.

== Aftermath ==
Several villages in the affected area were abandoned. Alfonso V of Aragon, the King of Aragon, received news of the disaster while he was residing in Apulia. He would only return to Naples in early February 1457, where he declined tax exemption requests by survivors in the affected towns. Alfonso V stated that the survivors were able to pay taxes as they inherited the fortune of those who were killed. Reconstructions by the authorities were limited; only military fortresses, roads and bridges were supported in the interests of the military.

== See also ==
- List of earthquakes in Italy
- List of earthquakes in Irpinia
- List of historical earthquakes
