= Diana de Feo =

Italian journalist and politician (1937–2021)

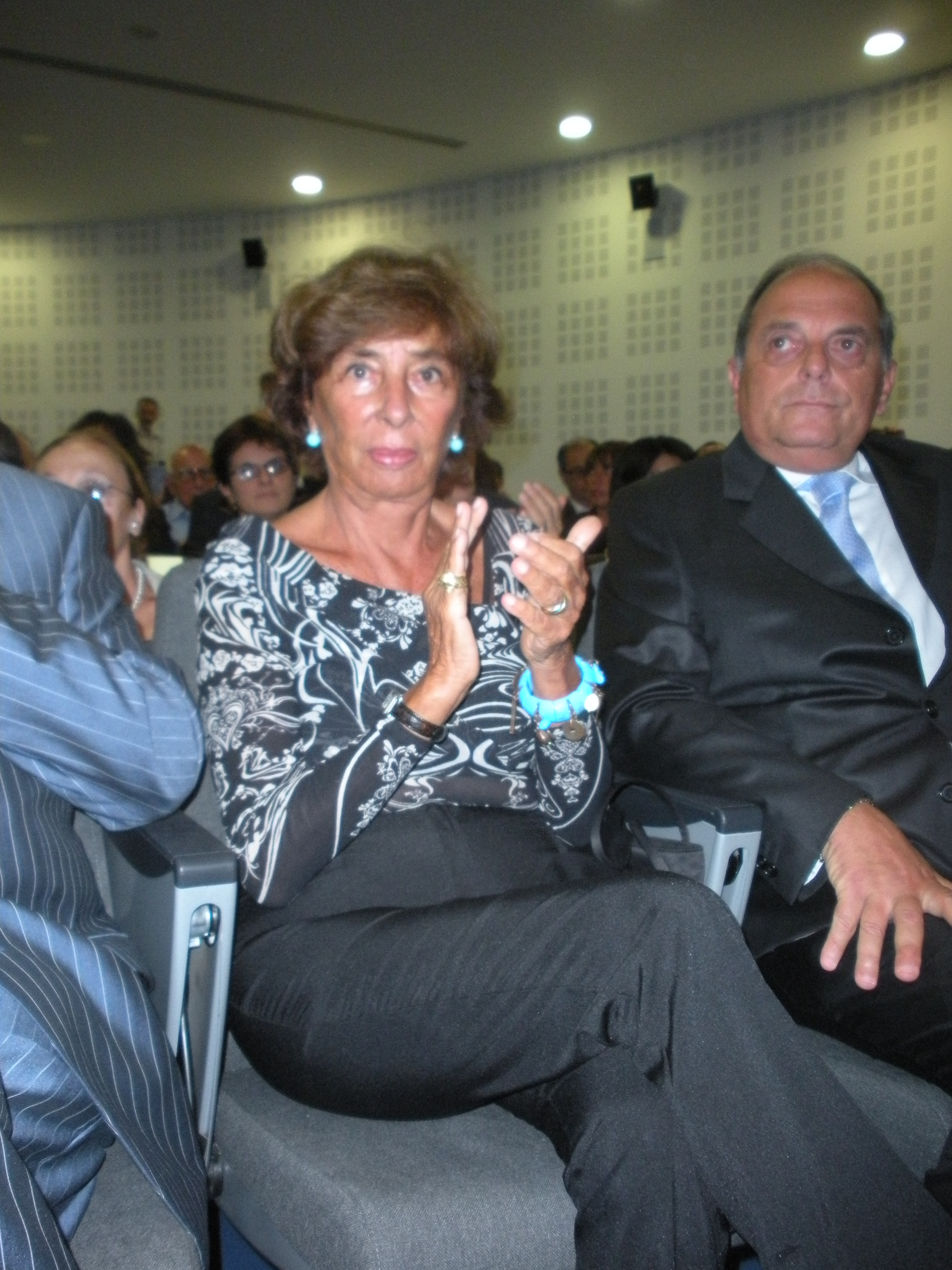
Diana de Feo

Diana de Feo (9 March 1937 – 23 June 2021) was an Italian journalist and politician who served as a Senator.

== Biography ==
Born in Turin, she was the daughter of Italo de Feo, journalist, historian, politician, director of the RAI, and head of the press office of the National Liberation Committee. She lived in Naples and, from 1965, was married to her colleague Emilio Fede, with whom she had two daughters, Sveva and Simona. She was a professional journalist, registered since 1966 with the Order of Journalists of Lazio.

Both King Constantine II of Greece and King Juan Carlos I of Spain expressed the intention of marrying her.

She died on 23 June 2021 at her home in Naples, at the age of 84, after a long illness. The funeral was held in the church of San Gennaro, in via Bernini, in the Vomero district. Her ashes rest in the family chapel at the cemetery of Mirabella Eclano.

=== Journalistic career ===
From 1976 to 1996 she collaborated, together with Flora Favilla, on the daily TG1 column curated by Giorgio Ponti Almanacco del giorno dopo. Previously, she had worked for seven years for the same news program in the editorial office “Cronache del Lavoro e dell’Economia”. She was also a special correspondent for TG1 covering art and culture.

=== Political activity ===
At the 2008 Italian general election, at the invitation of Silvio Berlusconi, she ran for the Senate of the Republic on the lists of The People of Freedom in the Campania constituency, placed tenth on the list, and was elected senator. During the 16th Legislature of the Italian Republic she was a member of the 7th Commission on Public Education and Cultural Heritage, the extraordinary parliamentary commission for price control, and the parliamentary committee on Schengen, Europol and immigration.

At the 2013 Italian general election she announced that she would not seek re-election to the Italian Parliament.
