= 1732 Irpinia earthquake =

Earthquake in Southern Italy

- Location within Italy
- Local date: 29 November 1732
- Local time: 08:40 UTC+1
- Magnitude: 6.6 M_{w}
- Epicenter: 41°04′48.0″N 15°09′00.0″E
- Areas affected: Southern Italy
- Max. intensity: MMI X (Extreme)
- Casualties: 1,940 deaths

The 1732 Irpinia earthquake was a seismic event with a magnitude of 6.6 that affected Irpinia and part of Sannio. It occurred on 29 November 1732 at 8:40 a.m. local time (UTC+1). The epicenter was located in the Campanian Apennines, in the area of the Ufita Valley, which is part of the modern-day Province of Avellino. Around twenty populated areas were destroyed entirely or in part and tens of others were significantly damaged. The number of deaths was estimated to be 1,940. Damage from the earthquake was classified as "severe" (indicating damage between $5 and US$24 million), and the number of homes destroyed as classified as "many" (indicating between 101 and 1,000 homes). The earthquake had a rating on the modified Mercalli intensity scale of X (extreme).

Among the most devastated communities were Mirabella Eclano (which was razed to the ground), Carife, Grottaminarda, and Ariano Irpino. Damage was serious in the provincial capital of Avellino, while in Benevento, there were mainly partial collapses of buildings.

== See also ==
- List of historical earthquakes
- List of earthquakes in Italy
