= Silver Museum (Ariano Irpino) =

Art museum in Ariano Irpino, Italy

- Museo degli argenti
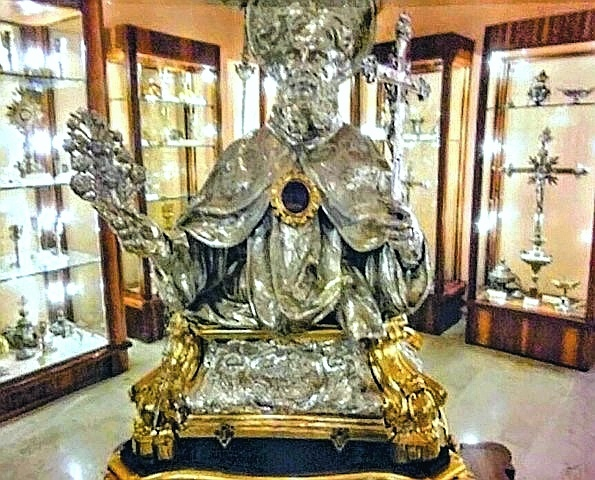
- Location: Ariano Irpino Cathedral, Ariano Irpino, Province of Avellino, Campania, Italy
- Coordinates: 41.152782°N 15.088333°E

The Silver Museum of Ariano Irpino (Italian: museo degli argenti) is located in the former treasury of the Ariano Irpino Cathedral, in Italy.

== Description ==
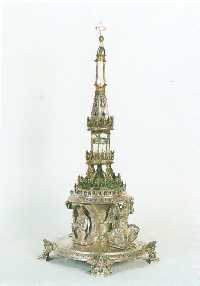
Reliquary of the Holy Thorns

In the adjacent former church of Santa Lucia Annunziata, there is the diocesan museum which houses paintings from the Neapolitan 17th and 18th centuries, other textile, wooden and marble works as well as a large number of sacred objects and furnishings.
