= Sant'Angelo all'Esca =

- Comune
- Comune di Sant'Angelo all'Esca
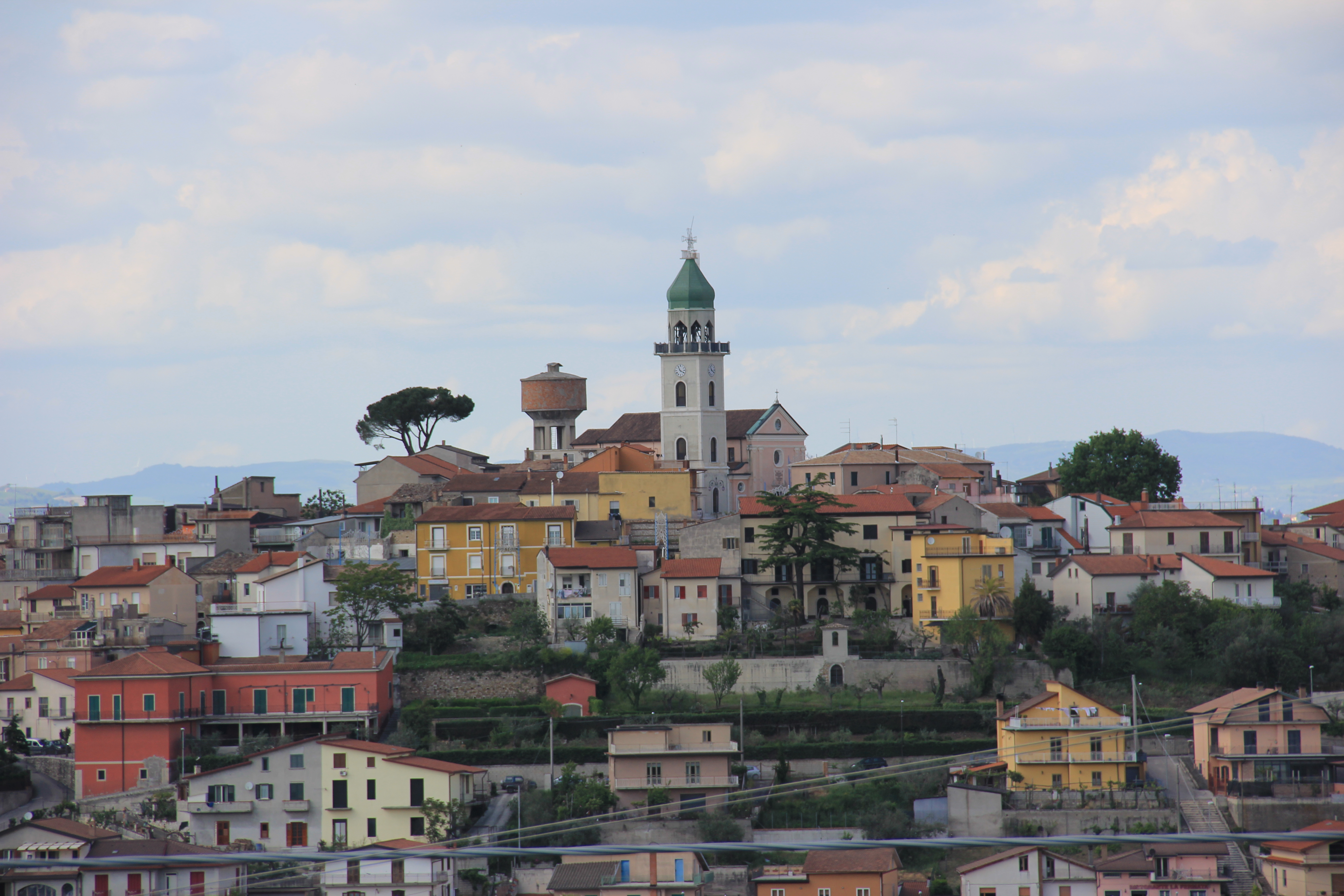
- A view of Sant'Angelo all'Esca

- Coat of arms

- Location within Italy Location within Campania
- Coordinates: 41°1′N 15°1′E
- Country: Italy
- Region: Campania
- Province: Avellino (AV)
- Frazioni: Fontanarosa, Luogosano, Mirabella Eclano, Taurasi

Government
  - Mayor: Carletto Tommaselli

Area
  - Total: 5 km^{2} (1.9 sq mi)
- Elevation: 460 m (1,510 ft)

Population (31 August 2018)
  - Total: 782
  - Density: 160/km^{2} (410/sq mi)
- Demonym: Santangiolesi
- Time zone: UTC+1 (CET)
  - Summer (DST): UTC+2 (CEST)
- Postal code: 83050
- Dialing code: 0827
- ISTAT code: 064090
- Patron saint: San Michele Arcangelo
- Saint day: 8 May and 29 September
- Website: Official website

Sant'Angelo all'Esca is a town and comune in the province of Avellino, Campania, southern Italy.
