= Leopoldo Faretra =

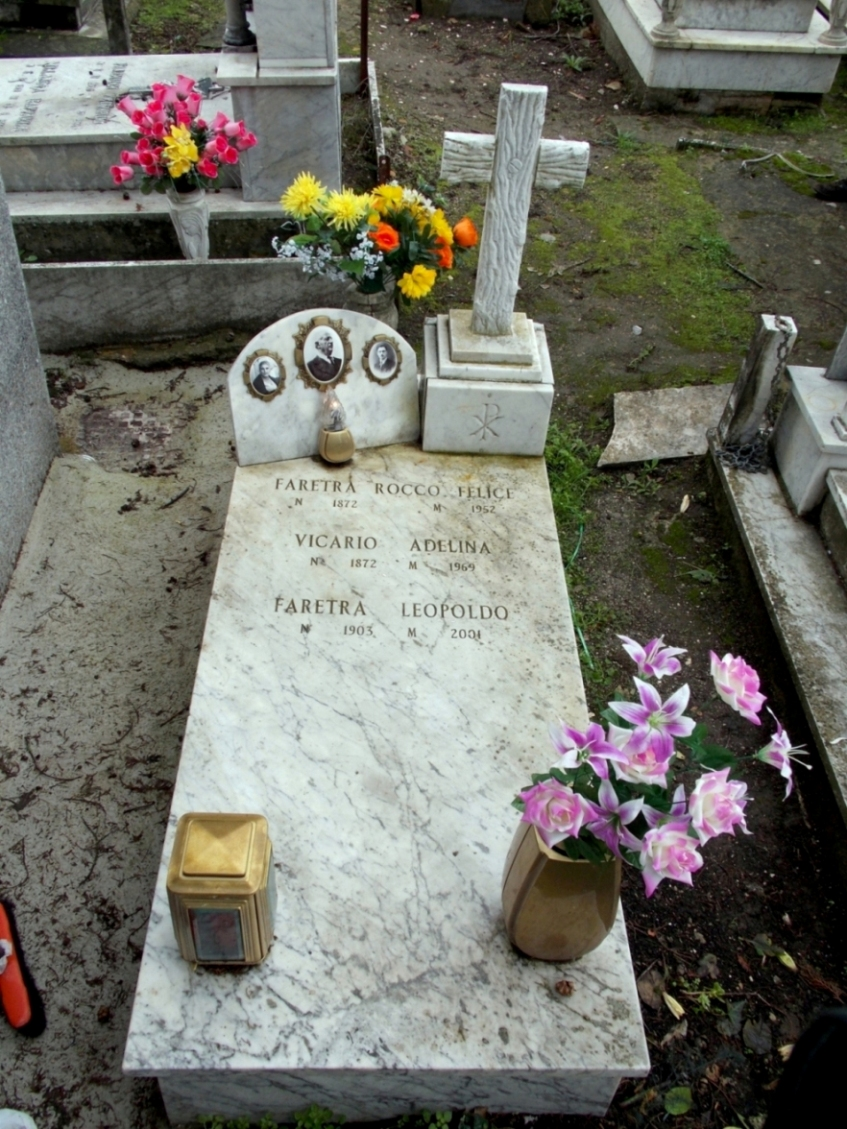

Leopoldo Faretra (Grottaminarda, 1 February 1908 – Passo Eclano, 25 May 2001) was an Italian physician. He devoted his life to those in need of care and was strongly attached to his political ideals. After his death, on 16 March 2010 he was awarded the Medal of Honor as an Italian citizen deported to a Nazi concentration camp.

== Early life ==
Leopoldo Faretra was born in Grottaminarda. He devoted his life to poor and needy people and fought infant mortality.

== Career ==
From 2 November 1943 to 13 April 1945 he directed the Infirmary in the Italian concentration camp in Hemer, in northwest Germany. He created many false medical certificates in an attempt to allow hundreds of Italians to avoid work in German factories.

On 3 September 1944, Faretra was reported to the Gestapo for propagating anti-German propaganda and causing the failure of the request for voluntary cooperation by the Germans.

Post-war, he worked as health officer in Rocchetta Sant'Antonio. He migrated to Venezuela because of his socialist ideals. Faretra notably gave immediate help to survivors of an air crash at risk to his own life.

In 1957 he specialized in gynaecology and he saved unborn babies and mothers in childbirth through surgical operations
