= Luogosano =

- Comune
- Comune di Luogosano
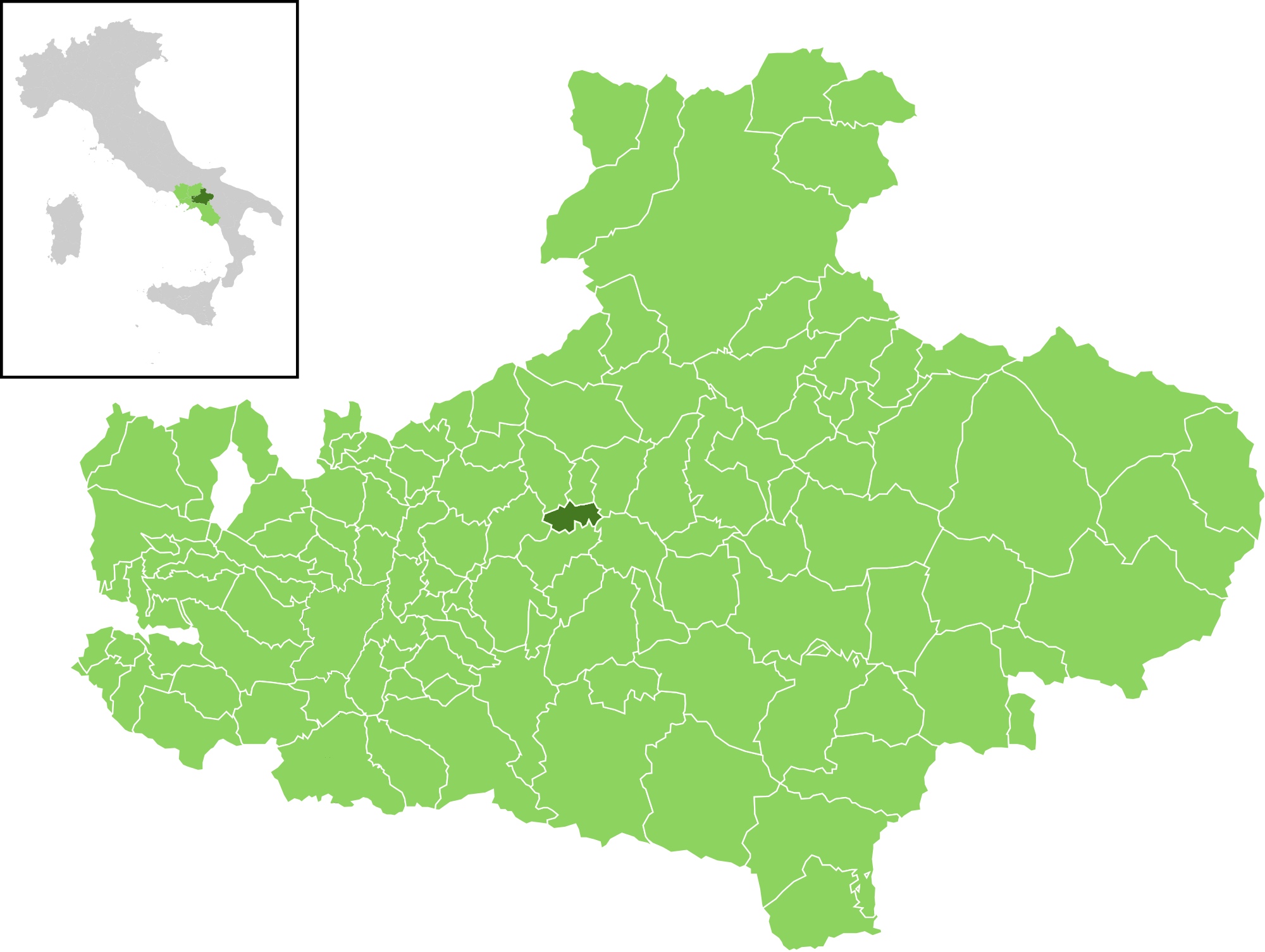
- Location of Luogosano in Avellino

- Location within Italy Location within Campania
- Coordinates: 40°59′18″N 14°59′30″E
- Country: Italy
- Region: Campania
- Province: Avellino (AV)
- Frazioni: Fontanarosa, Lapio, Paternopoli, San Mango sul Calore, Sant'Angelo all'Esca, Taurasi

Area
  - Total: 6.03 km^{2} (2.33 sq mi)
- Elevation: 390 m (1,280 ft)

Population (1 May 2009)
  - Total: 1,228
  - Density: 204/km^{2} (527/sq mi)
- Demonym: Luogosanesi
- Time zone: UTC+1 (CET)
  - Summer (DST): UTC+2 (CEST)
- Postal code: 83040
- Dialing code: 0827
- ISTAT code: 064045
- Patron saint: San Marcellino
- Saint day: 2 June
- Website: Official website

Luogosano is a town and comune in the province of Avellino, Campania, Italy.
