= Angelo Maffucci =

Italian pathologist

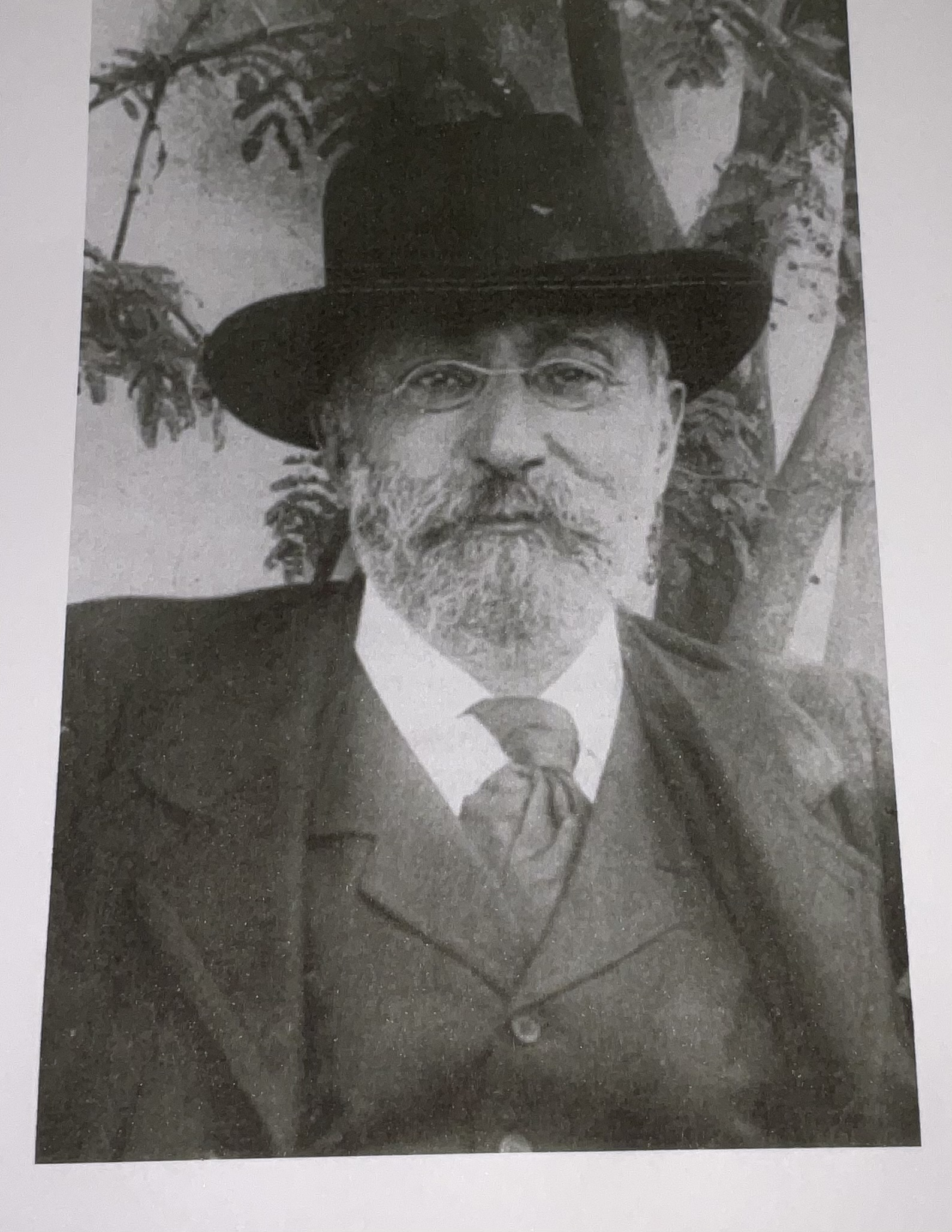
- Angelo Maffucci
- Born: October 27, 1847; Calitri
- Died: November 24, 1903 (aged 56); Pisa
- Occupation: Pathologist

Angelo Maria Maffucci (October 27, 1847 – November 24, 1903) was an Italian pathologist of the nineteenth century. His most important scientific contribution is related to the description of the disease known as Maffucci's Syndrome. Maffucci was a pioneer in the field of embryonal infective pathology. His settlement in Pisa, as the chairman of Pathology, represents a very significant moment for the Pisan academic environment and for the University of Pisa.

== Biography ==
=== Early life and education ===
Angelo Maria Maffucci was an Italian pathologist born in the town of Calitri in the province of Avellino on October 27, 1847, from a family of farmers, son of Michele and Benedetta Nicolais. His parents, who at first wanted him to continue the traditional family business, to then embrace the ecclesiastical career, were disappointed when after completing his secondary studies, Maffucci enrolled in the degree course in Medicine and Surgery at the University of Naples from which he graduated in 1872.

After graduating, Maffucci was active in the campaign against cholera as medical officer and as surgeon at the Hospital of Santa Maria del Popolo (Ospedale degli Incurabili). His commitment in the cause earned him a medal in 1873.

His first approaches with pathological anatomy were realized in the renowned Neapolitan School of Otto von Schrön(1837-1917), he worked as a surgeon at the Ospedale degli Incurabili in Naples and as a vaccinating physician at the Town Hall of the same city.

=== Professional career ===
In 1880, he won a competition for the chair of General Pathology at the University of Messina, however the university didn't allow funding for his research due to the skepticality on his project, which led him to renounce his position. In 1884 he occupied the Chair of Pathological Anatomy at the University of Catania, he abandoned his position briefly after when he was offered a position at the University of Pisa where he remained until his death.

Of his prolific activity remain numerous manuscripts, prints, drawings and watercolours illustrations, with meticulous precision, the observations made in many years of medical practice, today conserved in the library of History of Medicine of the university La Sapienza of Rome. Maffucci was a member of numerous academies and scientific societies, including the Accademia Nazionale dei Lincei, and he received from the Venetian Institute of Sciences, Letters and Arts a prize for the progress in Medical Sciences.

=== Later life ===
He retired to Vallombrosa, near Florence, from where he wrote to the Minister of Education:

"[...] From the last December to today, I've been under the influence of a malarial fever, with seven relapses and because of the advice of illustrious clinicians, among which Pietro Grocco, I took myself to this mountain where a modest benefit begins to be seen..."

The desired improvement did not occur and Maffucci died in Pisa on November 24, 1903, at the age of 56.

== Research and discoveries ==
=== Maffucci's Syndrome ===
In the Pisan period, Maffucci had the opportunity to conclude his studies on the disease he had discovered and since 1941, has been internationally known as "Maffucci's Syndrome".

It is a pathology that affects bones and skin at the same time and in which a benign cartilaginous tumor, called enchondroma, is associated with the appearance of cutaneous angiomas.

Maffucci had described in 1881 the diseases for the first time, in a 40-year-old woman, hospitalized for a vascular tumor prone to severe and frequent bleeding, which died from complications resulting from amputation of the limb (site of the tumor).

==== Signs and symptoms ====
The signs and symptoms may be detected at birth, however they are more commonly seen at around 5 years of age. Enchondromas develop near the ends of bones, where normal growth occurs. Due to these bone malformations, people affected by Maffucci's Syndrome usually are short in stature and have underdeveloped muscles.

Even though Maffucci's Syndrome starts out as benign, the tumors can become cancerous especially affecting the bones therefore the enchondromas may become chondrosarcomas.

==== Causes ====
Maffucci's Syndrome is generally caused by mutations in the IDH1 or IDH2 gene. These genes encode for enzymes called isocitrate dehydrogenase 1 and isocitrate dehydrogenase 2, respectively. These enzymes convert a compound called isocitrate to another compound called 2-ketoglutarate a reaction necessary to produce a molecule of the electron transport chain, NADPH, present in cellular respiration.

Maffucci's Syndrome is not inherited as the mutations which cause it are somatic. The mutation is thought to occur in a cell during early development before birth; cells that arise from that abnormal cell have the mutation, while the body's other cells do not. This situation is called mosaicism.

=== Tuberculosis ===
The frequency and cruelty of tuberculosis disease at the end of the 800 will lead him to carry out the same experiments, his work goes so far that, in 1890 he communicates the discovery of two different tuberculous mycobacteria and, according to him, one exclusively responsible for the disease in birds and the other precisely for human and bovine tuberculosis.

Maffucci was the first to isolate the pathogen of avian tuberculosis and described its peculiarities compared to the pathogens of the human and bovine variant. Even before the discovery of the German scientist Koch of tuberculin, Maffucci managed to induce a marantic state in experimental animals, by inoculation of sterile tuberculous products.

Through his scientific work Maffucci contributes to realizing the dream of serotherapy based on the production of a vaccine obtained from the attenuated living bacilli and a sero-prophylaxis aimed at combating and eradicating tuberculosis disease.

=== Further discoveries ===
Maffucci always carried with him a small album in which he illustrated the histological profiles of the pathologies of the system nervous, especially of cauda equina, and the effects of congenital syphilis in the liver, lungs and bones. It also illustrates in finer detail the cellular lesions caused by cirrhosis from annular and insular cirrhosis of the liver and, finally, the skeletal angiomatosis.

Maffucci continued his anatomical and experimental studies on liver pathology, making the important pathogenetic distinction between atrophic cirrhosis resulting from stagnation of bile by occlusion of the bile ducts, and hypertrophic cirrhosis ichthyic result of chronic inflammation of the biliary tract. He described unusual anatomical pathological pictures and conducted experimental observations on the pathophysiology of the peritoneum, describing the mechanism of resorption of corpuscular substances capable of determining structural modifications. On the pathology of the peritoneum: experiments and observations and of the joints, clarifying some structural and functional aspects of articular cartilage at the time still almost ignored.

Maffucci worked on the full development on the infectious etiology of neoplasms, he conducted numerous observations aimed at identifying a possible pathogen responsible for tumor growth: the isolation in some cases of streptococci and blastomycetes, however, did not seem significant enough to attribute to these microorganisms a certain etiopathogenetic role in the appearance of tumors.

== School of Pisa ==
In 1884, Pathological Anatomy was instituted as a course, the realization of this project was strongly supported by the Municipality of Pisa.

The School of Medicine was completed in 1874 and on November 17, during the inauguration ceremony, Professor Pietro Durante, Ordinary of Normal Human Anatomy, communicated the complete theoretical aspect of the teachings, among which appeared that of the Anatomy and Pathological Histology.

The actual realization of a chair of Pathological Anatomy, however, will be held only in 1884. The left wing of the School was inaugurated as the Institute of Pathological Anatomy, its direction as well as the chair was handed to Angelo Maria Maffucci.

=== Maffucci's contribution to the University of Pisa ===
Florence was the first University to establish the teaching of Pathological Anatomy (in 1840), while Pisa wasn't a relevant structure (physical nor administrative) in supporting the research and the study in this field. Maffucci had a revolutionary role in the position of Pisa in the field of Pathological Anatomy, since he founded the institute and also the museum, both annexed to the medical school. Antonio Costa defined him "a very worthy master among the most worthy", since he correctly identified the need of teaching and scientific research.

Maffucci divided the teaching into theoretical (Institutions of Pathological Anatomy) and practical (autopsies, histopathological technique and diagnostics), and his contribution was so important that it is possible to state that Pisa, thanks to Maffucci, was the first Italian university in which students had the opportunity, in the course of their studies, to associate the practical activity with the theoretical teaching.

He showed the same commitment in setting up and then enriching the Museum of Pathological Anatomy: to the important collection of collected preparations by Filippo Civinini in 1839, Maffucci added many other finds of various kinds, concerning, in particular, bone pathologies. At the same time he started to assemble what over time will become a collection, varied and rich, of histological preparations.

== Publications ==
- Contribuzione all'anatomia patologica del sarcoma dell'intestino, «Il Movimento medico-chirurgico», XI, 1879.
- Nota preventiva sul cancro primaria del fegato, in Studii anatomici e sperimentali, ibidem, XIII, 1881.
- Cancro dello stomaco e sarcoma dell'ovaio nello stesso individuo, in «Il Movimento medicochirurgico», XIV, 1882.
- Studii anatomici e sperimentali sulla cirrosi ipertrofica ed atrofia biliare del fegato, in «Giornale internazionale delle Scienze Mediche», IV, 1882.
- Sulla patologia del peritoneo. Esperimenti ed osservazioni, Ibidem, XV, 1883.
- Ricerche sperimentali sull'azione dei bacilli della tubercolosi dei gallinacei e dei màmmiferi nella vita embrianale ed adulta del pollo, in «Riforma Medica», 1889.
- Sull'azione tossica dei prodotti del bacillo della tubercolosi, in Atti dell'VIII Adunanza della Soc. Ital. di Chirurgia, 1891.
- Sulla tubercolosi ereditaria paterna, in Atti della X Adunanza della Soc. Ital. di Chir., 1895.
- Contribuzione alle malattie del midollo spinale. Emorragia delle meningi con la sindrome delle lesioni della cauda equina, Pisa, Mariotti, 1897.

== Honours and awards ==
Despite his shy and reserved character, Angelo Maffucci had some important honours related to his work.

- He was dean of the Faculty of Medicine and Surgery of the University of Pisa;
- In 1900 he was elected Member Ordinary of the Accademia dei Lincei as international of Italian Pathology;
- King Umberto I himself wanted to show him his esteem by giving him, for his experiments, horses and calves of the Roval Estates of Coltano and San Rossore.

== Bibliography ==
- Arieti Stefano, Dizionario Biografico degli Italiani, 2006, Volume 67.
- Rosalba Ciranni, Valentina Giuffra, Silvia Marinozzi, Gino Fornaciari, Medicina dei Secoli, 2004; pp. 31–41.
- National Library of Medicine (US), Maffucci Syndrome, 2022.
- Verma, Gopalkrishna G., Jain, Vijay Kumar, Iyengar, Karthikeyan, Monomelic Maffucci syndrome.
- Annuario della R. Università di Pisa per l'a.a. 1904-1905, 1904–1905, pp. 4–8.
