= 1694 Irpinia–Basilicata earthquake =

Earthquake in Italy

- Local date: 8 September 1694
- Magnitude: 6.9 M_{w}
- Epicenter: 40.90°N 15.43°E
- Areas affected: Kingdom of Naples
- Casualties: 6,000+

1694 Irpinia–Basilicata earthquake
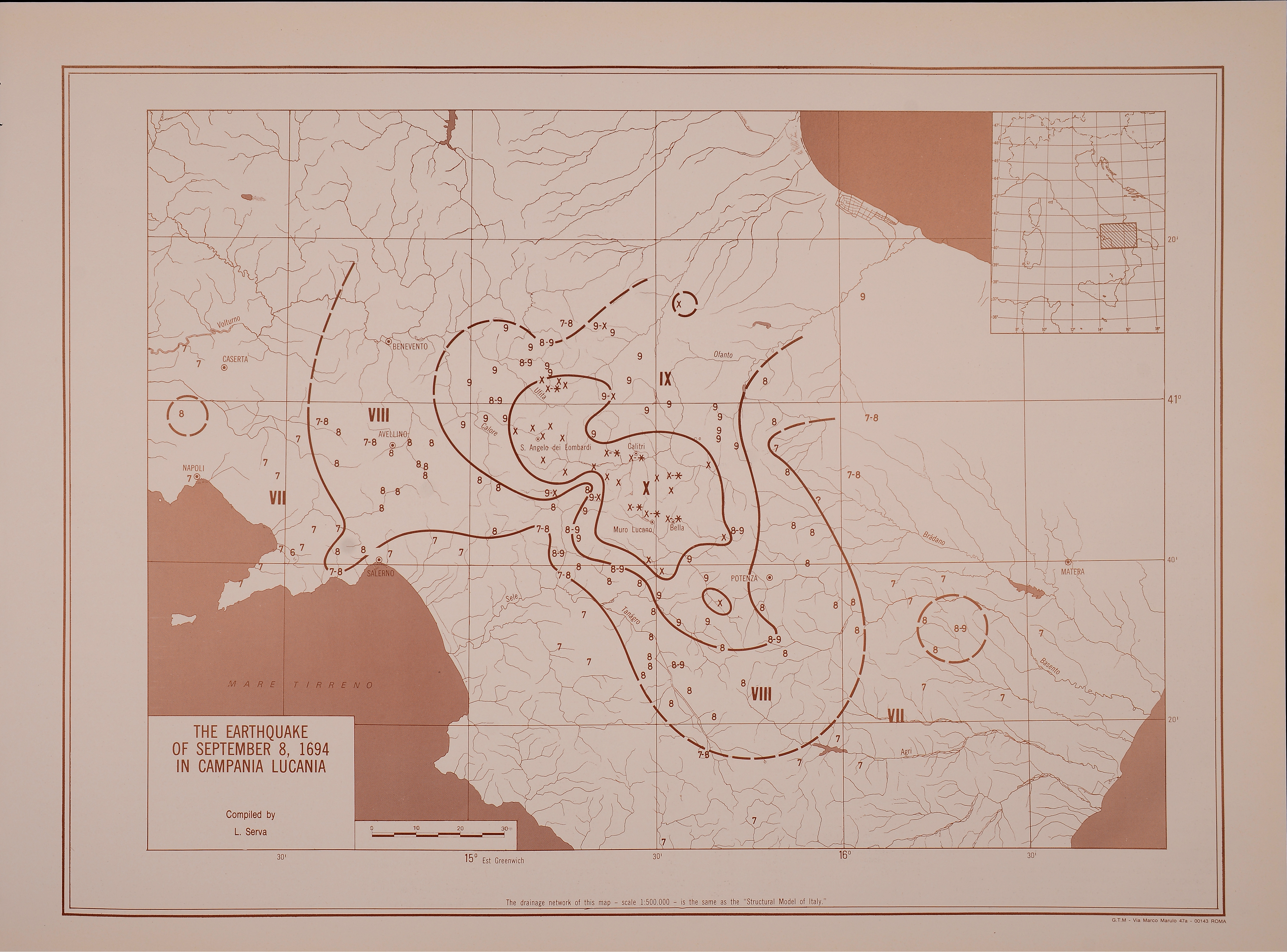
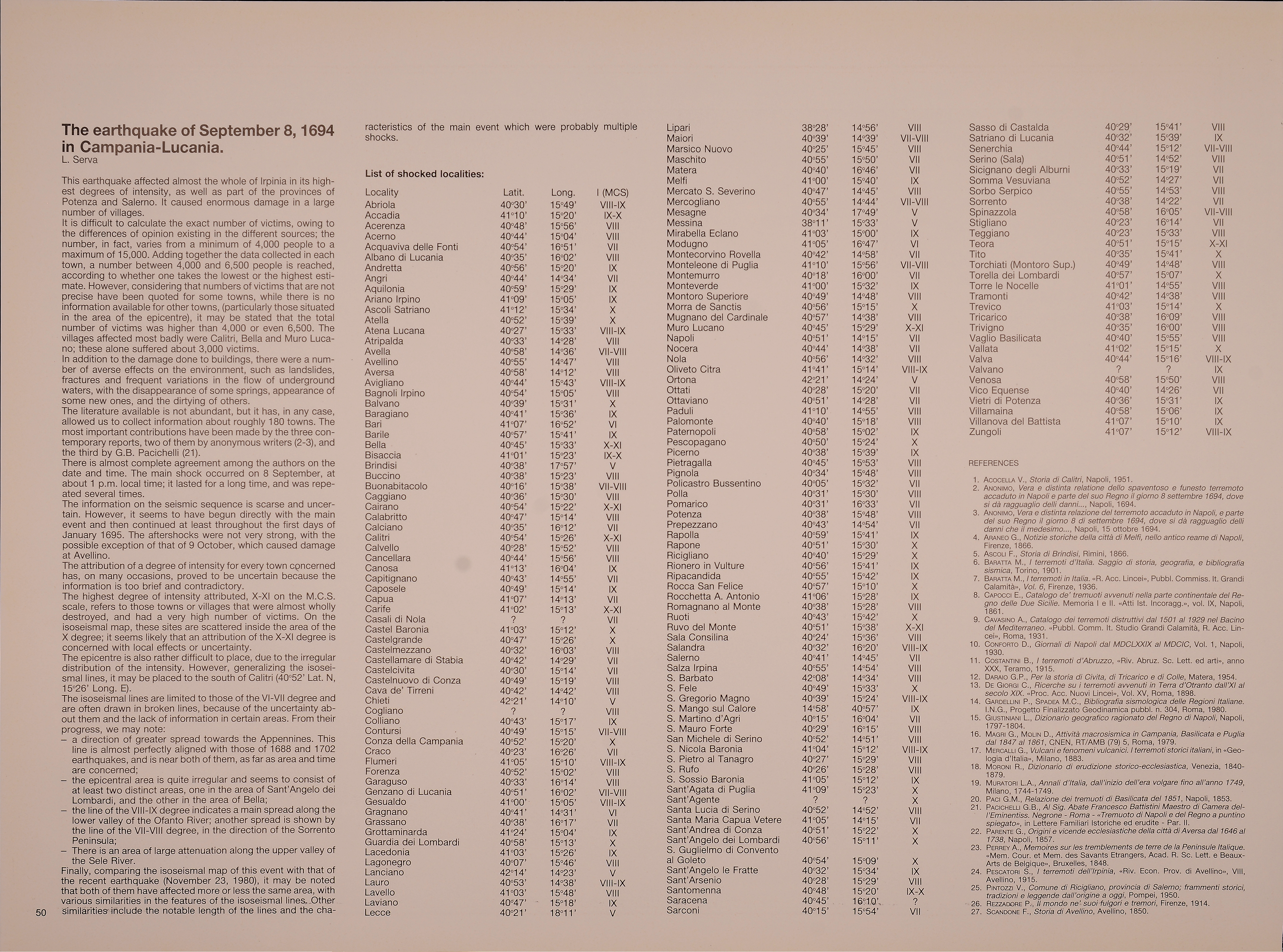
Maps and notes on the earthquake

The 1694 Irpinia–Basilicata earthquake occurred on 8 September. It caused widespread damage in the Basilicata and Apulia regions of what was then the Kingdom of Naples, resulting in more than 6,000 casualties. The earthquake occurred at 11:40 UTC and lasted between 30 and 60 seconds.

== Tectonic setting ==
The central and southern part of the Apennines has been characterised by extensional tectonics since the Pliocene epoch (i.e. about the last 5 million years), with most of the active faults being normal in type and NW-SE trending. The extension is due to the back-arc basin in the Tyrrhenian Sea opening faster than the continental collision of the African plate and the Eurasian plate.

== Damage ==
There was serious damage to the area between Campania and Basilicata, with more than 30 municipalities being almost completely destroyed. These included Bisaccia. Sant'Angelo dei Lombardi, Bella and Muro Lucano In Melfi, fifty buildings collapsed and the castle, cathedral, five monasteries and many churches were severely damaged. In Potenza, several buildings, the church and the Trinità Tower collapsed.

The following number of casualties were reported, 700 at Calitri, 700 at Sant'Angelo dei Lombardi, 600 at Muro Lucano, 400 at Ruvo del Monte, 300 at Teora, 280 at Guardia Lombardi, 250 at Bella, 230 at Pescopagano, 190 at Cairano, 160 at Atella, 120 at Sant'Andrea di Conza and 100 at Tito.

== Characteristics ==
The earthquake was preceded by a small foreshock on the evening of 7 September. The mainshock was followed immediately by an aftershock, the first of a series that lasted until June of the following year.

The earthquake occurred on a NW-SE trending normal fault. The area of damage for the 1694 earthquake is similar to that for the 1980 Irpinia earthquake, but involved movement on a different fault.

== See also ==
- List of earthquakes in Italy
- List of earthquakes in Irpinia
- List of historical earthquakes
