= Carpignano =

Carpignano may refer to some places in Italy:

- Carpignano (Grottaminarda), a hamlet of Grottaminarda (AV), Campania
- Carpignano (San Severino Marche), a hamlet of San Severino Marche (MC), Marche
- Carpignano Salentino, a municipality of the Province of Lecce, Apulia
- Carpignano Sesia, a municipality of the Province of Novara, Piedmont
- Cura Carpignano, a municipality of the Province of Pavia, Lombardy
