= Irpinia =

Geographical and cultural region of Southern Italy

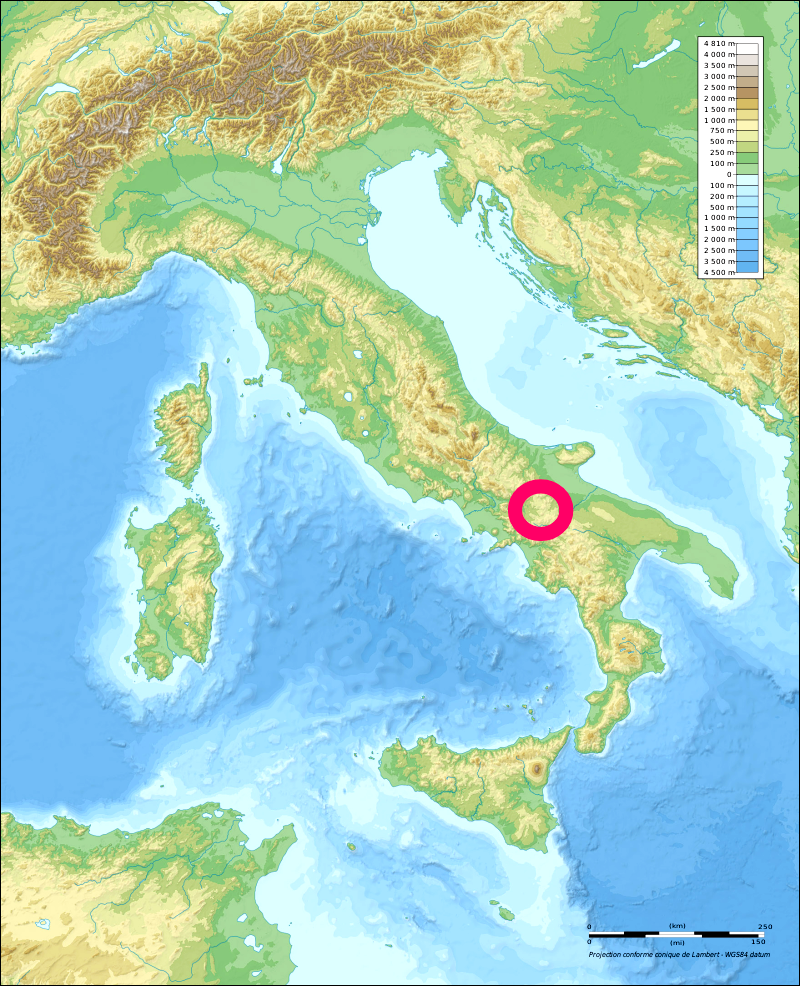
Map indicating Irpinia

Irpinia (Modern Latin Hirpinia) is a geographical and cultural region of Southern Italy. It was the inland territory of the ancient Hirpini tribe, and its extent matches approximately today's province of Avellino.

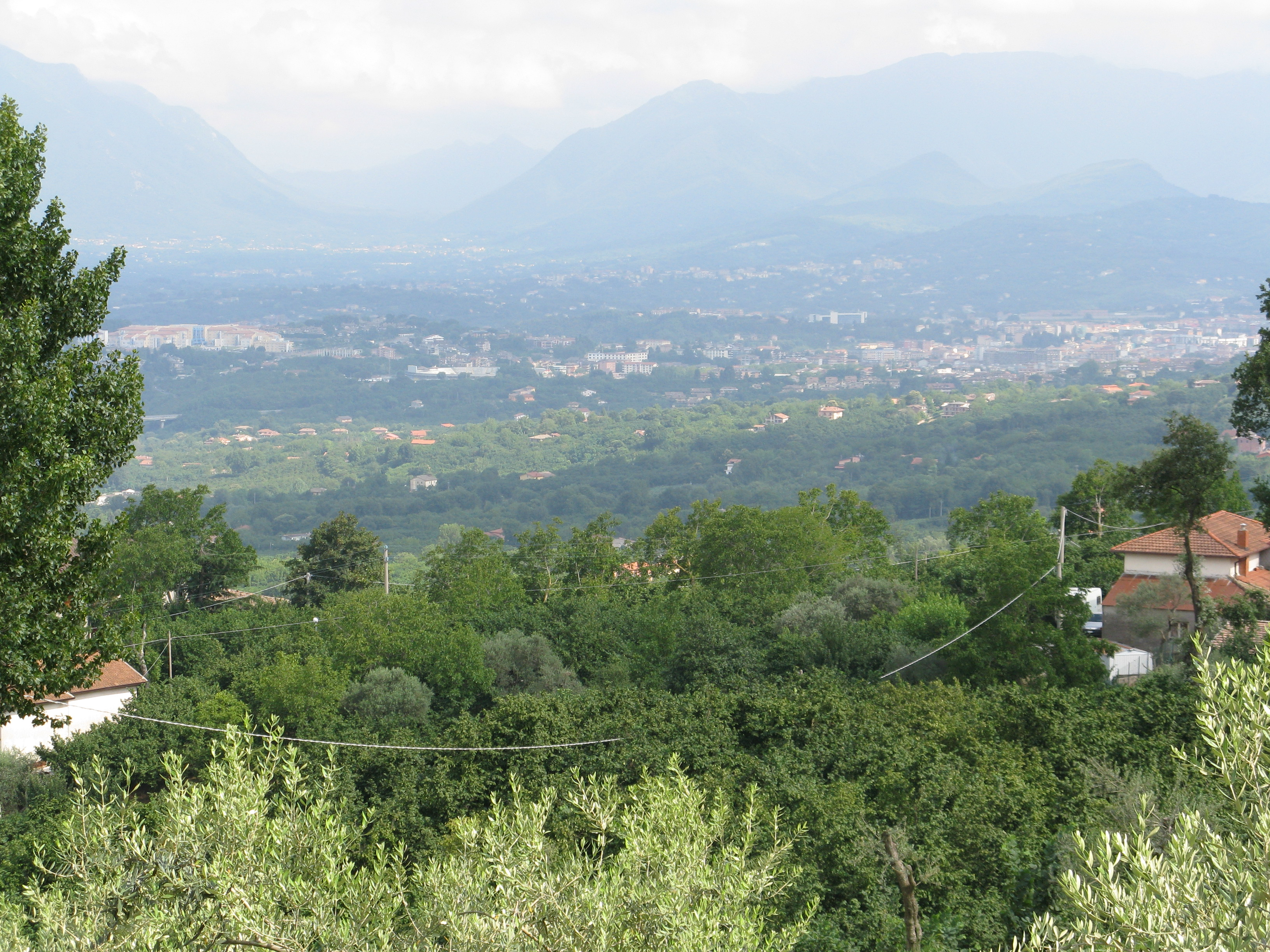
A typical landscape of Irpinia

== Geography ==
The territory is largely mountainous, with an intricate network of hills and valleys and a predominantly limestone Karst topography. To the north-east, however, the rocks are mostly sandstone, and the land's elevation is relatively lower. Irpinia is centred on the section of the Apennines which spans from the northern Sella di Ariano to the springs of the Sele River; the highest peak is Mount Avella (1,591 m). To the south are the Picentini Mountains, which include the highest peak of the region, Mount Cervialto (1,809 m). Irpinia is bordered on the east by the Ofanto valley, while to the north it merges with Sannio and Daunia.

== History ==
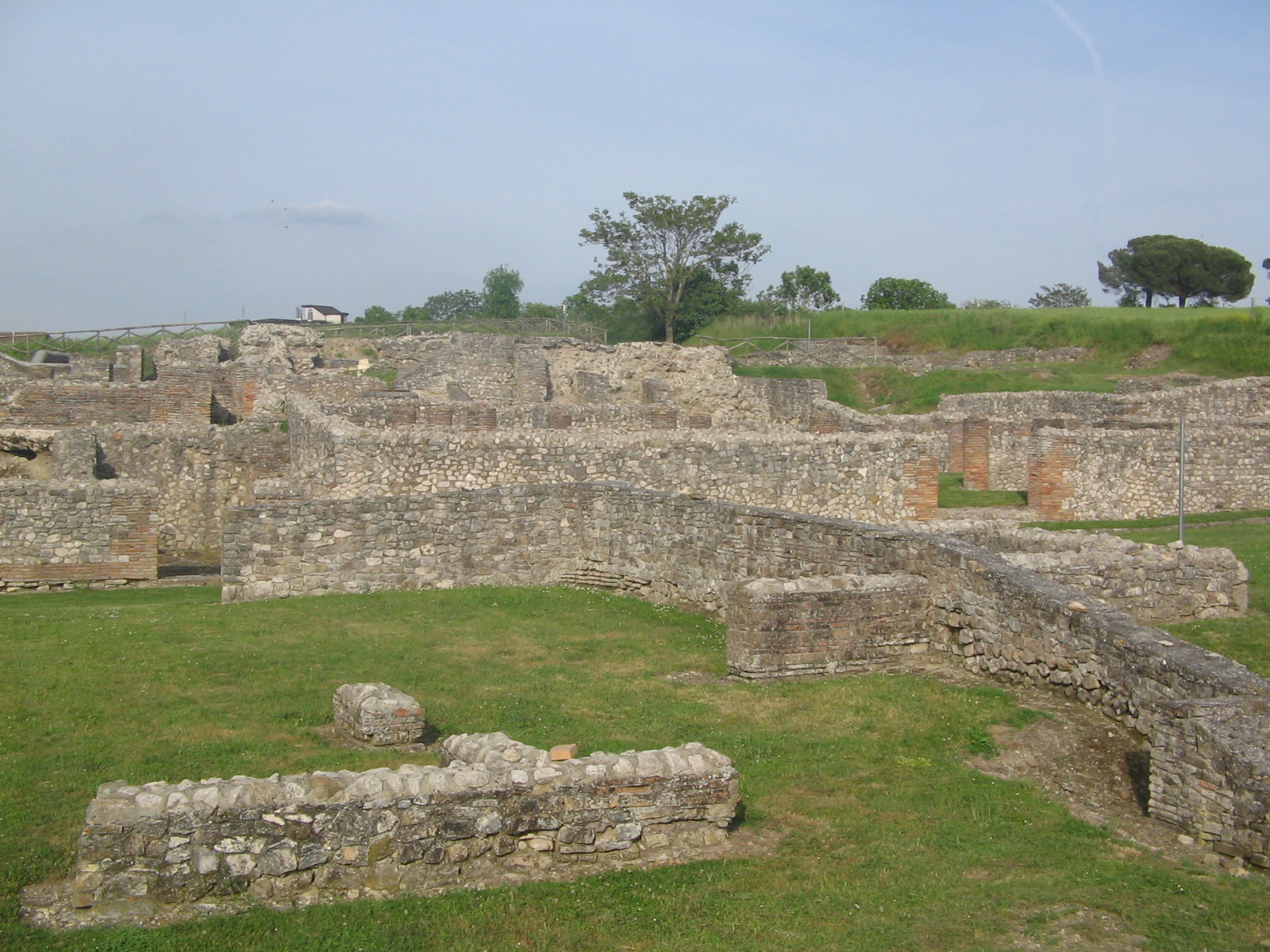
Ruins of the town Aeclanum.

The name "Irpinia" derives from the Oscan word "hirpus", which means wolf, and the wolf remains Irpinia's symbol to this day. Oscan tribes of the Sabines, under demographic pressure, migrated towards this area in the 6th century BC from what is now Umbria. The Hirpini occupied the region Sabato, Calore, Cervaro and Ofanto, becoming differentiated with time from the Samnites who settled the area from Molise and Matese. The main centres of the Hirpini were Maloenton (modern Benevento), Aeclanum (Mirabella Eclano), Aequum Tuticum (Ariano Irpino), Vescellium (near Roseto Valfortore), Trivicum (Trevico), Compsa (Conza), Aquilonia (Lacedonia), and Abellinum (Atripalda).

No certain date for the arrival of the Hiripini in the region can be given. They were already settled here at the time of the First Samnite War (342 BC). Their name is found in sources from 280 BC, when the Greek general Pyrrhus of Epirus made his expedition into Italy. A bronze medal reveals that they signed an alliance with the Samnites in 275 BC. Maloenton was early conquered by the Romans, which renamed it Beneventum and transformed it into a colony in 268 BC. The Hirpini suffered internal divisions at the time of the Second Punic War. Caius Marius gave them Roman citizenship in 87 BC, but they were deprived of any privilege under the former's victor, Sulla (80 BC).

Some Roman roads passed through Hirpini's territory: Via Appia, Via Aemilia, Via Traiana, Via Herculia and few other ones.

After the fall of the Western Roman Empire, Irpinia came successively under Byzantine, Lombard, Hohenstaufen, Anjou, Aragonese and finally Spanish domination. As part of the Kingdom of Naples it was included in the Principato Ultra or Ulterior, one of the few land-locked province of the kingdom. Feudalism was abolished in 1806, the same year in which Avellino was declared capital of the province.

Irpinia became part of the newly united Kingdom of Italy in 1861.

The district has been subject to a number of strong earthquakes. On November 23, 1980, the 6.9 M_{w} earthquake affected the area with a maximum Mercalli intensity of X (Extreme), killing 2,483–4,900, and injuring 7,700–8,934.

== Traditional produce and tourist sites ==
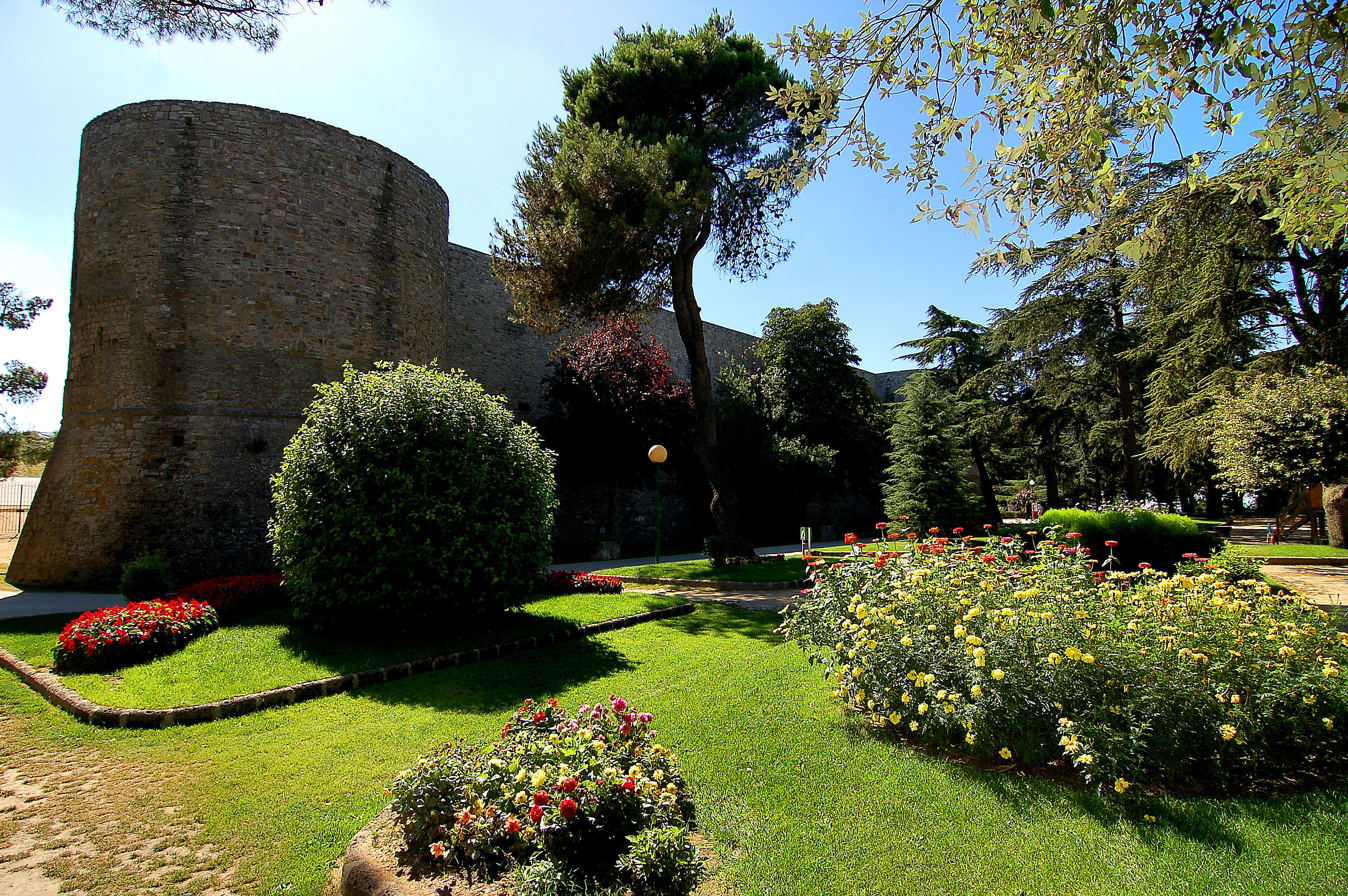
The medieval Castle and the surrounding public park of Ariano Irpino

Irpinia has a proud tradition of producing wines such as Fiano di Avellino, Greco di Tufo and Taurasi, all of which are classified as DOCG. Its cheeses, including scamorza and caciocavallo, have a high reputation. Irpinia's salami (Sopressata) and sausages are popular, as are its chestnuts, its hazelnuts and the black truffles of Bagnoli Irpino.

Tourist amenities are the ski resort Laceno, with a lake near Mount Terminio, and some villages. The most popular Irpinia's town is Ariano Irpino, which lies on the top of three steep hills and is provided with ancient sights (a medieval castle and a romanic cathedral), some museums, majolica shops and traditional restaurants. Other noteworthy centers are Mirabella Eclano (with the ancient town Aeclanum), Gesualdo (with the castle which was the home of the "prince of musicians" Carlo Gesualdo), Rocca San Felice (Mefitis'site), Calitri (Castle village) and Zungoli (a well-preserved medieval town).

Among the religious sanctuaries there are Montevergine (Mercogliano), the Shrine of St. Gerard (Caposele), the Sanctuary of Carpignano (Grottaminarda), and the Sanctuary of Valleluogo (Ariano Irpino); the latter is located near an ancient mill in a green valley, where in the Middle Age the Madonna showed up.

== See also ==
- Ariano Irpino
- Avellino
- Campania
- Duchy of Benevento
- Hirpini
- Irpinian dialect
- List of earthquakes in Irpinia
- Oscan language
- Province of Avellino
- Samnites
