= Gesualdo, Campania =

Gesualdo
- Comune
- Comune di Gesualdo
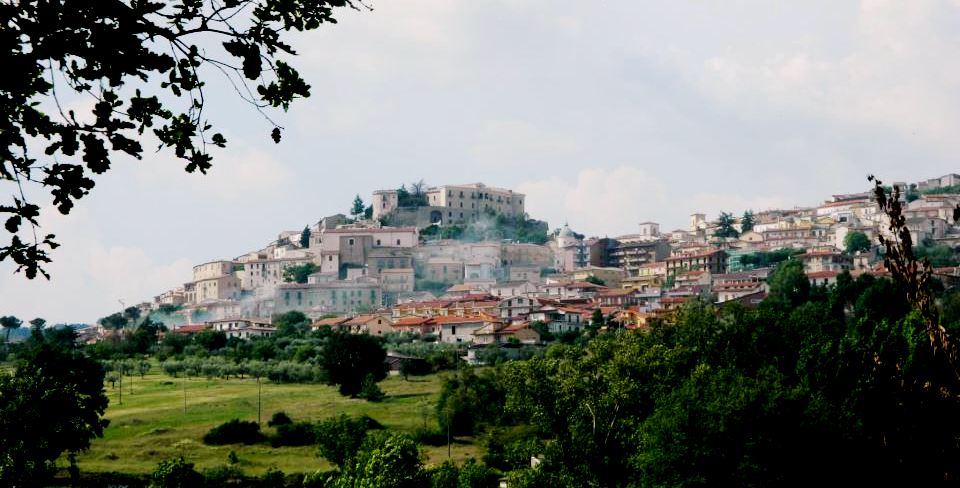

- Location within Italy Location within Campania
- Coordinates: 41°00′N 15°04′E
- Country: Italy
- Region: Campania
- Province: Avellino (AV)
- Frazioni: Piano della Croce, Torre dei Monaci

Government
  - Mayor: Edgardo Pesiri

Area
  - Total: 27.34 km^{2} (10.56 sq mi)
- Elevation: 640 m (2,100 ft)

Population (31 December 2017)
  - Total: 3,446
  - Density: 126.0/km^{2} (326.4/sq mi)
- Demonym: Gesualdini
- Time zone: UTC+1 (CET)
  - Summer (DST): UTC+2 (CEST)
- Postal code: 83040
- Dialing code: 0825
- Patron saint: Saint Nicholas
- Saint day: December 6th
- Website: Official website

Gesualdo is an Italian town in the province of Avellino, itself in the region of Campania. It is called "The city of the Prince of Musicians" in honour of Carlo Gesualdo. It has many palaces, fountains, belvederes, and a historical center, which was partially restored after the Irpinia earthquake in 1980.

The town is located in the center of Irpinia, between the valleys of the rivers Fredane and Ufita. It is about 90 kilometres (56 mi) from Naples and 290 kilometres (180 mi) from Rome. Surrounding municipalities are Fontanarosa, Frigento, Grottaminarda, Paternopoli, Villamaina. It is one of I Borghi più belli d'Italia ("The most beautiful villages of Italy").

== Castle ==
The first records of the Castle of Gesualdo date to Norman rule in the 12th century.

The castle was severely damaged in the 1980 Irpinia earthquake. Restoration work has not been completed yet, but the castle has been partially open to the public since 2015.

== Main sights ==
- Castle of Gesualdo, founded by Lombards in the 7th century, enlarged in the 15th. It was transformed by Carlo Gesualdo in the 16th and by the Cacceses in the 19th.
- Chiesa Madre di San Nicola (Saint Nicholas Mother Church, 12th century)
- Chiesa del Santissimo Sacramento (Blessed Sacrament Church) (Great Chapel).
- Chiesa del Santissimo Rosario (Most Holy Rosary Church, 17th century)
- Chiesa di Maria Santissima Addolorata (Our Lady of Sorrows Church, 17th century)
- Capuchin convent of Santa Maria delle Grazie, founded in the 16th century and enlarged in the 17th
- Church of Santa Maria della Pietà (17th century)

== Culture ==
Events in the village include:

- Carnevale Gesualdino (Gesualdo Carnival), a parade of paperboard wagons and masked groups, held in the Carnival period
- Volo dell'Angelo (Flight of the Angel), the secular tradition that sees a child, dressed as an angel, tied to a rope, acrossing a square at a height of more than 20 metres (66 ft); last Sunday of August.
