= Cervialto =

Mountain in Italy

Coordinates: 40°46′54″N 15°07′50″E

Highest point
- Elevation: 1,809 m (5,935 ft)
- Prominence: 1,129 m (3,704 ft)
- Listing: Ribu

Geography
- Location: Campania, Italy

Cervialto is a mountain of Campania, Italy.
