= Isocitrate dehydrogenase (NADP+) kinase =

Class of enzymes

[isocitrate dehydrogenase (NADP+)] kinase

Identifiers
- EC no.: 2.7.11.5
- CAS no.: 83682-93-3

Databases
- IntEnz: IntEnz view
- BRENDA: BRENDA entry
- ExPASy: NiceZyme view
- KEGG: KEGG entry
- MetaCyc: metabolic pathway
- PRIAM: profile
- PDB structures: RCSB PDB PDBe PDBsum
- Gene Ontology: AmiGO / QuickGO
Search
- PMC: articles
- PubMed: articles
- NCBI: proteins

In enzymology, a [isocitrate dehydrogenase (NADP+)] kinase (EC 2.7.11.5) is an enzyme that catalyzes the chemical reaction:

ATP + [isocitrate dehydrogenase (NADP^{+})] $\rightleftharpoons$ ADP + [isocitrate dehydrogenase (NADP^{+})] phosphate

Thus, the two substrates of this enzyme are ATP and isocitrate dehydrogenase (NADP+), whereas its two products are ADP and isocitrate dehydrogenase (NADP+) phosphate.

This enzyme belongs to the family of transferases, specifically those transferring a phosphate group to the sidechain oxygen atom of serine or threonine residues in proteins (protein-serine/threonine kinases).

== Other names ==
The systematic name of this enzyme class is ATP:[isocitrate dehydrogenase (NADP+)] phosphotransferase. Other names in common use include [isocitrate dehydrogenase (NADP+)] kinase, ICDH kinase/phosphatase, IDH kinase, IDH kinase/phosphatase, IDH-K/P, IDHK/P, isocitrate dehydrogenase kinase (phosphorylating), isocitrate dehydrogenase kinase/phosphatase, and STK3.
