= Ariano Irpino Cathedral =

Roman Catholic cathedral in Ariano Irpino, Campania

Coordinates: 41.1527°N 15.0878°E

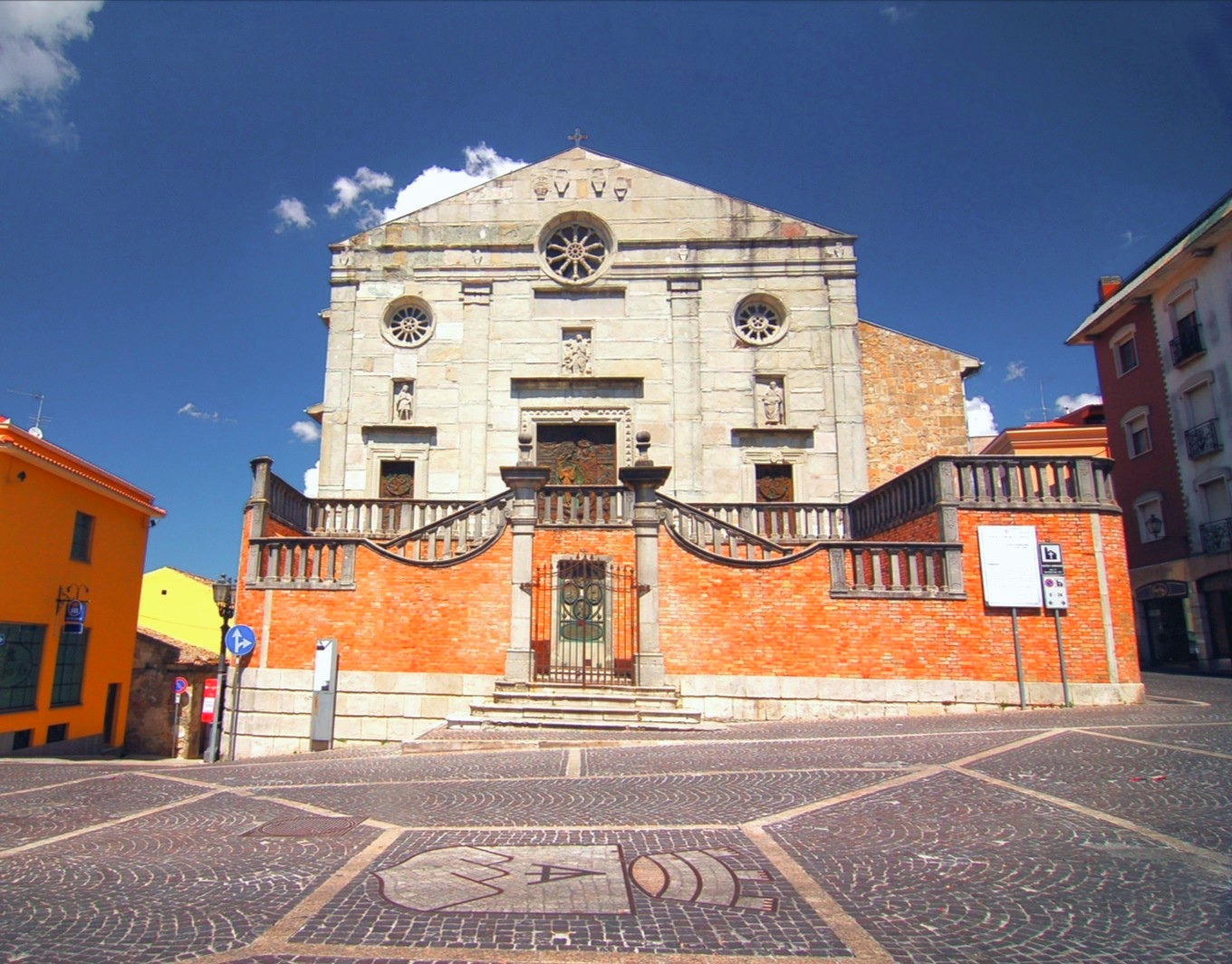
West facade of the cathedral

Ariano Irpino Cathedral, formerly Ariano Cathedral (Italian: Duomo di Ariano or Ariano Irpino, Cattedrale di Santa Maria Assunta), is a Roman Catholic cathedral in Ariano Irpino (formerly Ariano di Puglia), in the province of Avellino, Campania, Italy, dedicated to the Assumption of the Virgin Mary. It was formerly the episcopal seat of the diocese of Ariano, and is now that of the diocese of Ariano Irpino-Lacedonia.

== History and description ==
Ariano Cathedral is a Romanesque building on a Latin cross groundplan, with three naves under groin vaulting, crossed by an elevated transept, terminating in the presbytery. The cathedral is dedicated to the Assumption of the Virgin Mary and to Saint Ottone Frangipane and Saint Elzéar of Sabran, protectors of the city. In 1984 John Paul II granted it the title of a basilica minor.

Originating from the 10th century and built on the ancient ruins of a temple of Apollo, the building has been repeatedly ravaged by earthquakes and pillaging, leading to countless repairs and refurbishments over the centuries. Of the original structure all that is known is that it was ruined in an earthquake of 988. It was quickly rebuilt, and the new cathedral remained standing until 1255, when the troops of Manfred stormed the city wall and destroyed the entire city, including the cathedral, because of its loyalty to the papacy. The new king, Charles of Anjou, when he had defeated Manfred, had all the places rebuilt which Manfred had destroyed, including Ariano and its cathedral, although it was not completed until 1309. The new building was devastated by the earthquakes of 1349 and 1456. The bishop at that time, Orso de Leone, undertook the responsibility of the rebuilding, of which remains can still be seen in the ancient crypt and in the lower part of the internal pilasters (now plastered).

The cathedral suffered again in the earthquakes of 1688, 1702 and 1732. On the last occasion the then bishop, Filippo Tipaldi, completed the new construction in 1736, giving it the form and structure it has today. The interior is covered in plaster and stucco in Baroque style, hiding the pilasters and arches of massive stone, and leaving no sign of the preceding Romanesque and Gothic features.

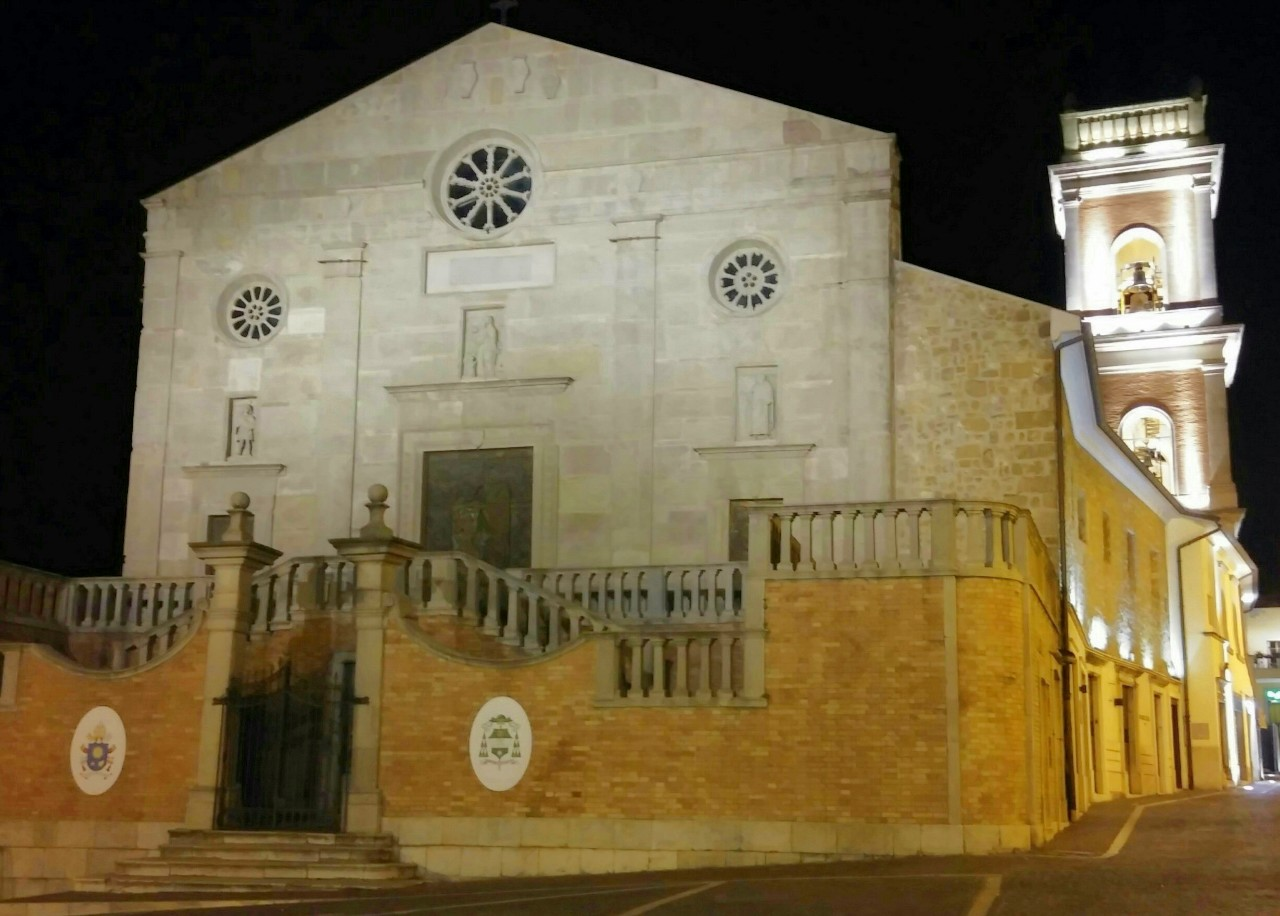
The cathedral and the bell tower by night

Externally the west front is Romanesque with a gabled (or double sloped) roof, built in 1500 in green sandstone from Roseto. The three portals are also of this period, but the rose windows are later. The building, which is elevated above street level, is reached by an arrangement of steps of a later period.

Ariano Cathedral has preserved a single thorn believed to have been taken from Jesus' crown of thorns. It has been recorded since 1633 that the thorn "bleeds" whenever Good Friday falls on 25 March, which is the traditional date for both the Annunciation and the Crucifixion of Christ. Even now the thorn and the treasure are retained in the Diocesan Museum of Silver, near the cathedral.
