= Grottaminarda =

- Comune
- Comune di Grottaminarda
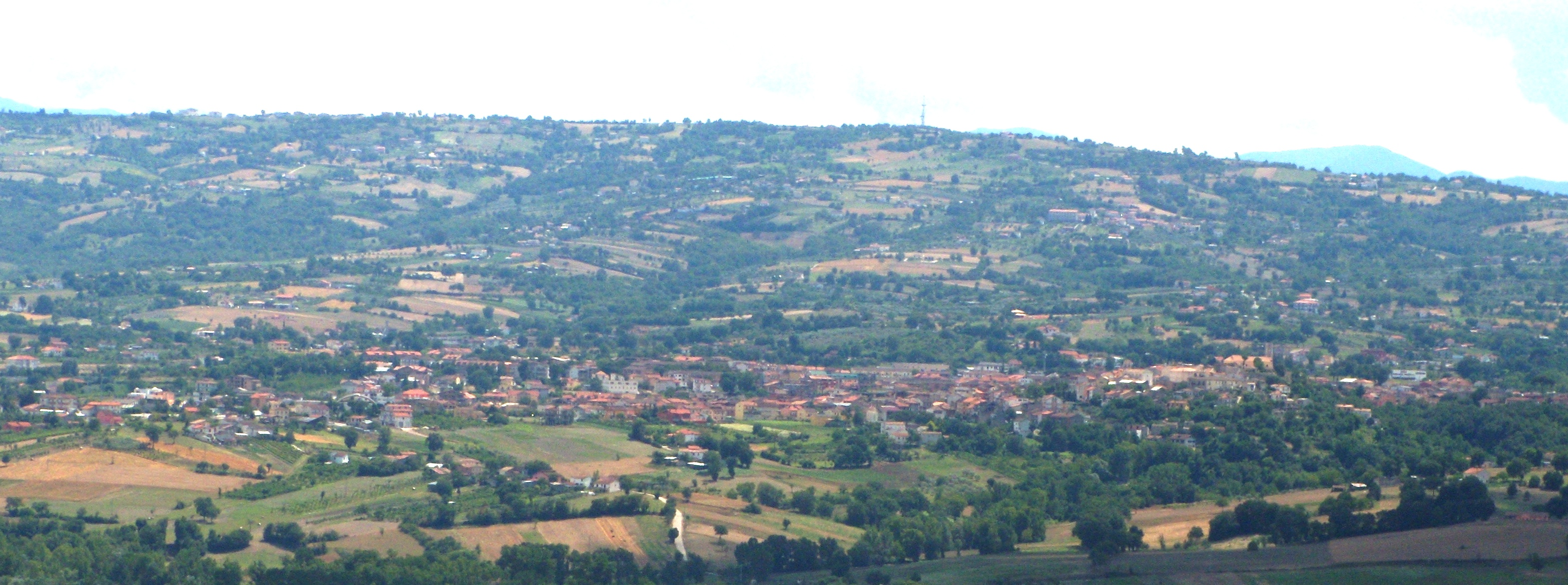
- View of Grottaminarda

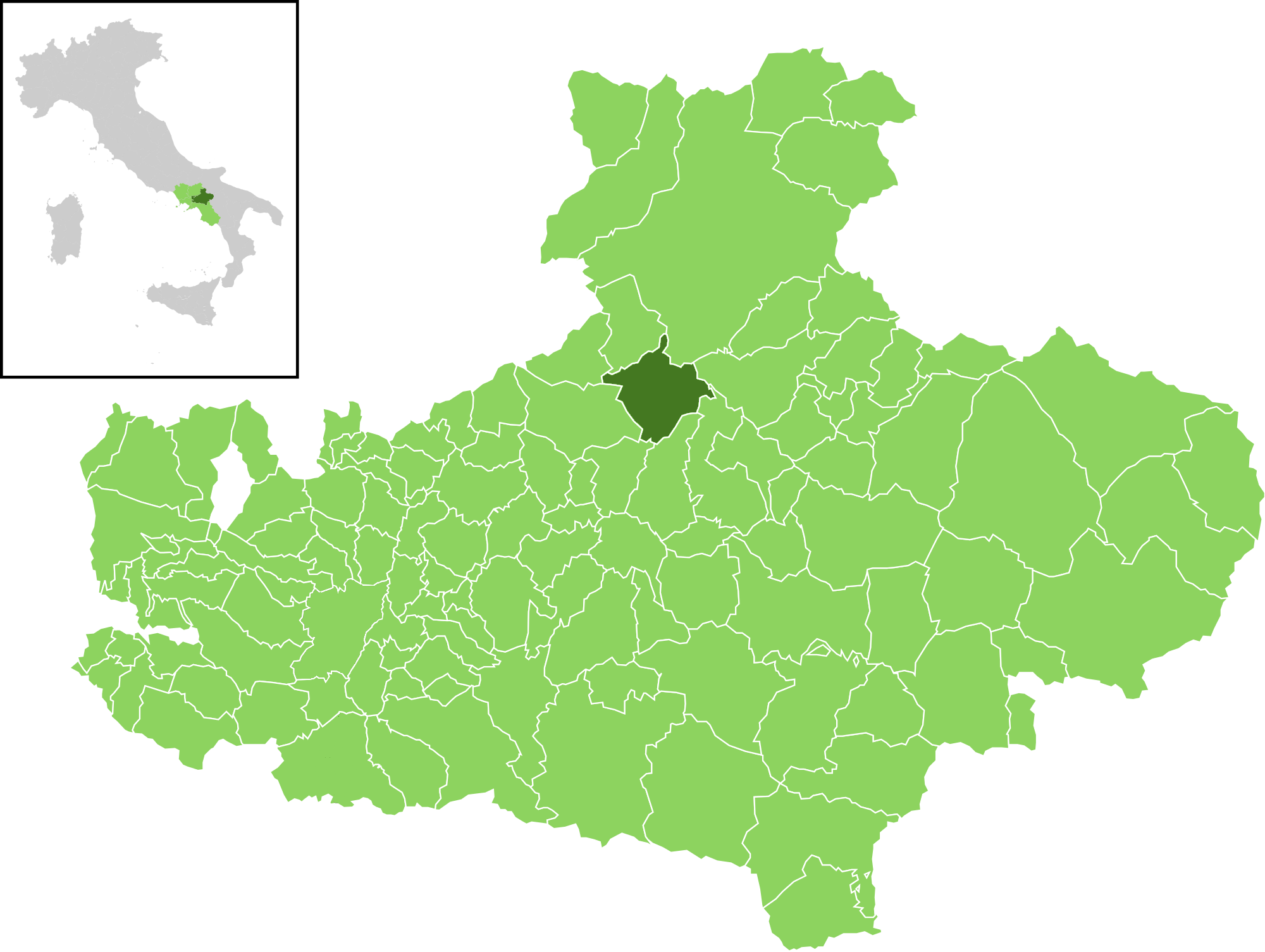
- Grottaminarda within the Province of Avellino

- Location within Italy Location within Campania
- Coordinates: 41°04′09″N 15°03′36″E
- Country: Italy
- Region: Campania
- Province: Avellino (AV)
- Frazioni: Bosco, Carpignano, Ciavolone, Conduttiello, Feudo Cortesano, Filette, Ischia Cardone, Marmore, San Martino, San Pietro, Schivito, Tremolizzi

Government
  - Mayor: Angelo Cobino

Area
  - Total: 29.12 km^{2} (11.24 sq mi)
- Elevation: 304 m (997 ft)

Population (31 December 2017)
  - Total: 8,004
  - Density: 274.9/km^{2} (711.9/sq mi)
- Demonym: Grottesi
- Time zone: UTC+1 (CET)
  - Summer (DST): UTC+2 (CEST)
- Postal code: 83035
- Dialing code: 0825
- Patron saint: St. Thomas
- Website: Official website

Grottaminarda (Irpino: Rótta) is a town and comune in the province of Avellino (Campania), situated 80 kilometres (50 mi) northeast of Naples, in the southwest of Italy.

Grottaminarda is part of Roman Catholic Diocese of Ariano Irpino-Lacedonia and its territory borders with the municipalities of Ariano Irpino, Bonito, Flumeri, Fontanarosa, Frigento, Gesualdo, Melito Irpino and Mirabella Eclano.

== Economy ==
Today, Grottaminarda's industrial district provides jobs for workers commuting from nearby cities. Many small and medium farms are present as well. The comune is a producer of torrone and salami. A large market, including vendors of fruit, vegetables, cheese, salami and a wide variety of household items is held every Monday.

== Main sights ==
Sights include the churches of Santa Maria Maggiore, San Michele, and some ancient monuments. The Santuario di Carpignano is located in the village and frazione of Carpignano, 4.5 kilometres (2.8 mi) south.

== Transport ==
Grottaminarda is served by the A16 motorway Naples-Bari, at the homonym exit. It is crossed in the middle by the state highway SS90.

== People ==
- Leopoldo Faretra (1908-2001), physician
- Vincenzo Volpe (1855-1929), painter
