= Calitri =

- Comune
- Comune di Calitri
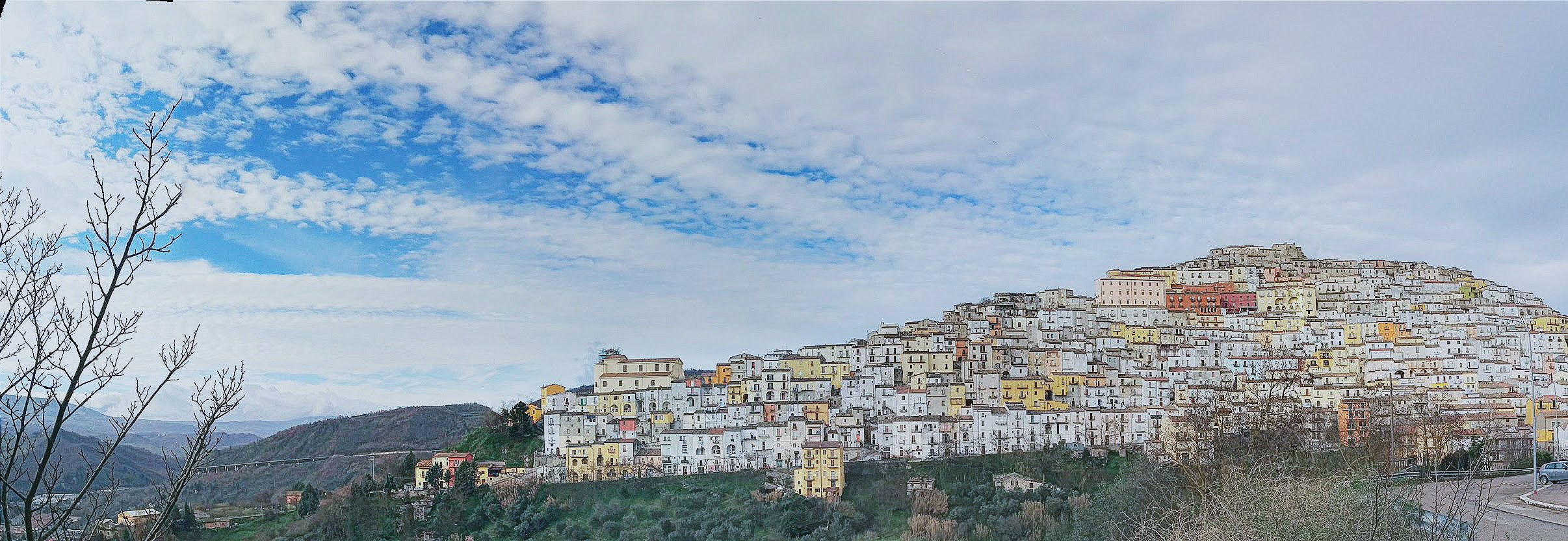

- Coat of arms

- Location within Italy Location within Campania
- Coordinates: 40°54′4″N 15°26′0″E
- Country: Italy
- Region: Campania
- Province: Avellino (AV)
- Frazioni: Calitri Scalo

Government
  - Mayor: Michele Di Maio

Area
  - Total: 100.88 km^{2} (38.95 sq mi)
- Elevation: 530 m (1,740 ft)

Population (31 December 2017)
  - Total: 4,582
  - Density: 45.42/km^{2} (117.6/sq mi)
- Demonym: Calitrani
- Time zone: UTC+1 (CET)
  - Summer (DST): UTC+2 (CEST)
- Postal code: 83045
- Dialing code: 0827
- Patron saint: St. Canius
- Saint day: May 25
- Website: Official website

Calitri (Irpino: Calìtr) is a town and comune in the province of Avellino, Campania, Italy.

== Overview ==
Calitri is in Campania near the borders of the regions of Apulia and Basilicata. It is approximately 530 metres (1,740 ft) above sea level so even on the hottest day there is generally mild. The Antico Borgo is in the oldest section of the town, the centro storico, at the top of which are the remains of a castle which predates the 12th century. The Borgo itself is a labyrinth of historic houses which have, over the centuries, been built into the hillside. Stone and marble stairs, frequently under old stone arches, connect the streets. Calitri suffered a devastating earthquake in 1980 and has only been partially rebuilt. The Castello at the top of its distinctive cone shaped hilltop is very impressive for its strong architectural forms. In recent reconstructions they are remerging as an important and physically attractive feature of the town.

Other recent excavation and reconstruction of an ancient Neviera in the Gagliano section of the town above the cemetery reveals an extensive underground, domed, ice-house of about 15 metres (50 ft) in height and 7.6 metres (25 ft) in horizontal circumference.

== People ==
- Vinicio Capossela, singer-songwriter
- Angelo Maffucci, an Italian pathologist remembered for isolating the bacteria that causes avian tuberculosis

== Sister cities ==
- Lavena Ponte Tresa (Italy)

== See also ==
- Irpinia

== Sources ==
- The role of the seismic trigger in the Calitri landslide (Italy): Historical Reconstruction and Dynamic Analysis Martino; Salvatore; Scarascia Mugnozza; Gabriele Publisher: Elsevier Ltd Publish date: 2005-12
