= Mirabella Eclano =

- Comune
- Comune di Mirabella Eclano
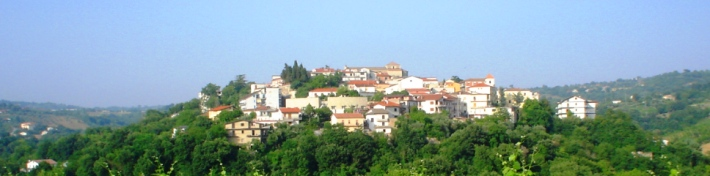

- Coat of arms

- Location within Italy Location within Campania
- Coordinates: 41°2′45″N 14°59′59″E
- Country: Italy
- Region: Campania
- Province: Avellino (AV)
- Frazioni: Calore, Passo di Mirabella, Pianopantano

Government
  - Mayor: Francescantonio Capone

Area
  - Total: 33.96 km^{2} (13.11 sq mi)
- Elevation: 372 m (1,220 ft)

Population (31 March 2018)
  - Total: 7,549
  - Density: 222.3/km^{2} (575.7/sq mi)
- Demonym: Eclanesi or Mirabellani
- Time zone: UTC+1 (CET)
  - Summer (DST): UTC+2 (CEST)
- Postal code: 83036
- Dialing code: 0825
- Patron saint: Madonna del Latte, Saint Blaise
- Saint day: 2 February
- Website: Official website

Mirabella Eclano is an Italian town and comune of the province of Avellino, in the Southern Italian Campania region. As of 2011 its population was 7,904.

== History ==
The Roman site of Aeclanum once stood nearby. It is now an archaeological park and lies in the frazione of Passo di Mirabella.

== Geography ==
Mirabella is located 46 kilometers from the provincial capital, Avellino, and 30 from Benevento. The municipality, located near the Province of Benevento, borders Apice, Bonito, Calvi, Fontanarosa, Grottaminarda, Sant'Angelo all'Esca, Taurasi, Torre Le Nocelle, and Venticano.

It counts the hamlets (frazioni) of Calore (shared with Venticano), Passo di Mirabella, and Pianopantano. Passo di Mirabella, located on the national highway "SS 90", represents the municipal commercial area.

== Notable people ==
- Julian of Eclanum (c. 386 – c. 455), bishop of Aeclanum

== See also ==
- Irpinia
