= Fontanarosa =

- Comune
- Comune di Fontanarosa
- Location within Italy Location within Campania
- Coordinates: 41°1′9″N 15°1′17″E
- Country: Italy
- Region: Campania
- Province: Avellino (AV)

Government
  - Mayor: Giuseppe Pescatore

Area
  - Total: 16.7 km^{2} (6.4 sq mi)
- Elevation: 480 m (1,570 ft)

Population (31 August 2017)
  - Total: 3,122
  - Density: 187/km^{2} (484/sq mi)
- Demonym: Fontanarosani
- Time zone: UTC+1 (CET)
  - Summer (DST): UTC+2 (CEST)
- Postal code: 83040
- Dialing code: 0825
- Patron saint: Saint Nicholas, Maria SS. della Misericordia (Most Holy Mary of Mercy)
- Saint day: 6 December (Saint Nicholas), 15 August (Maria SS. della Misericordia)
- Website: Official website

Fontanarosa is a town and comune in the province of Avellino, Campania, southern Italy.
