= Montevergine (disambiguation) =

Montevergine is a massif in Campania, Italy; location of the Territorial Abbey of Montevergine.

Montevergine may also refer to:

- Montevergine funicular, funicular railway that connects the town of Mercogliano with the mountain and catholic sanctuary of Montevergine
- Territorial Abbey of Montevergine, chief house of the Order of Monte Vergine
- Sanctuary of Montevergine, the basilica in the abbey
- Order of Monte Vergine, a Catholic monastic order
