= Sanctuary of Montevergine =

Marian church in Mercogliano, Italy

Coordinates: 40.9362°N 14.7285°E

Basilica santuario cattedrale abbazia territoriale di Santa Maria di Montevergine
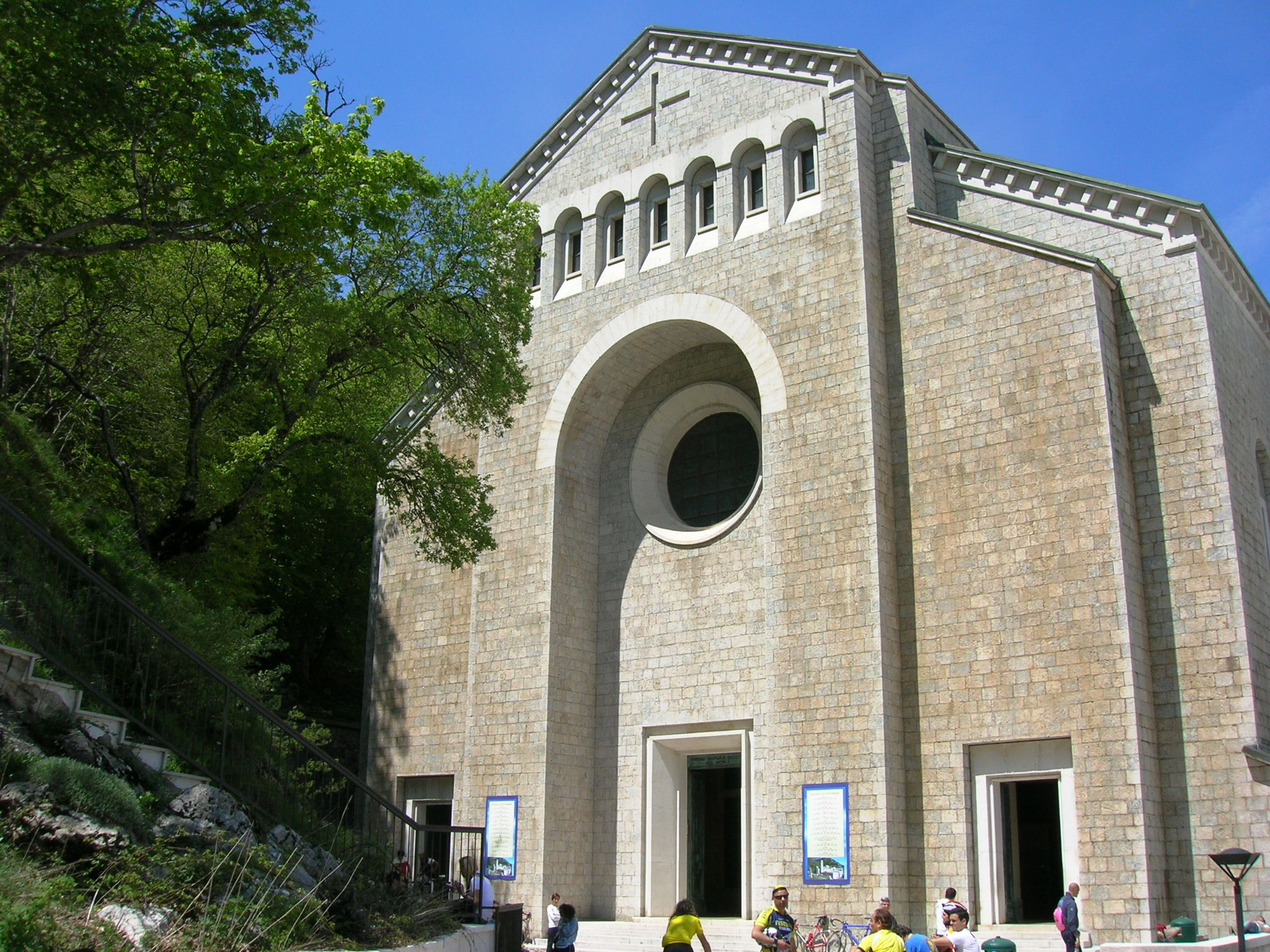
- External facade of the cathedral basilica

Religion
- Affiliation: Catholicism
- District: Mercogliano
- Region: Campania
- Year consecrated: 1961

Location
- State: ITA
- Interactive map of Basilica santuario cattedrale abbazia territoriale di Santa Maria di Montevergine

Architecture
- Architects: Giacomo Conforti and Florestano Di Fausto (new basilica)
- Style: Neoromanesque (new basilica)
- Established: 1952 (new basilica)
- Completed: 1961 (new basilica)

Website
- www.santuariodimontevergine.com

Sanctuary of Montevergine is a Marian church in Mercogliano, located in the hamlet of Montevergine. It's a part of the Territorial Abbey of Montevergine, one of the six Italian territorial abbeys. Inside, the painting of the Madonna di Montevergine is venerated and it is estimated that about one and a half million pilgrims visit it every year.

== History ==
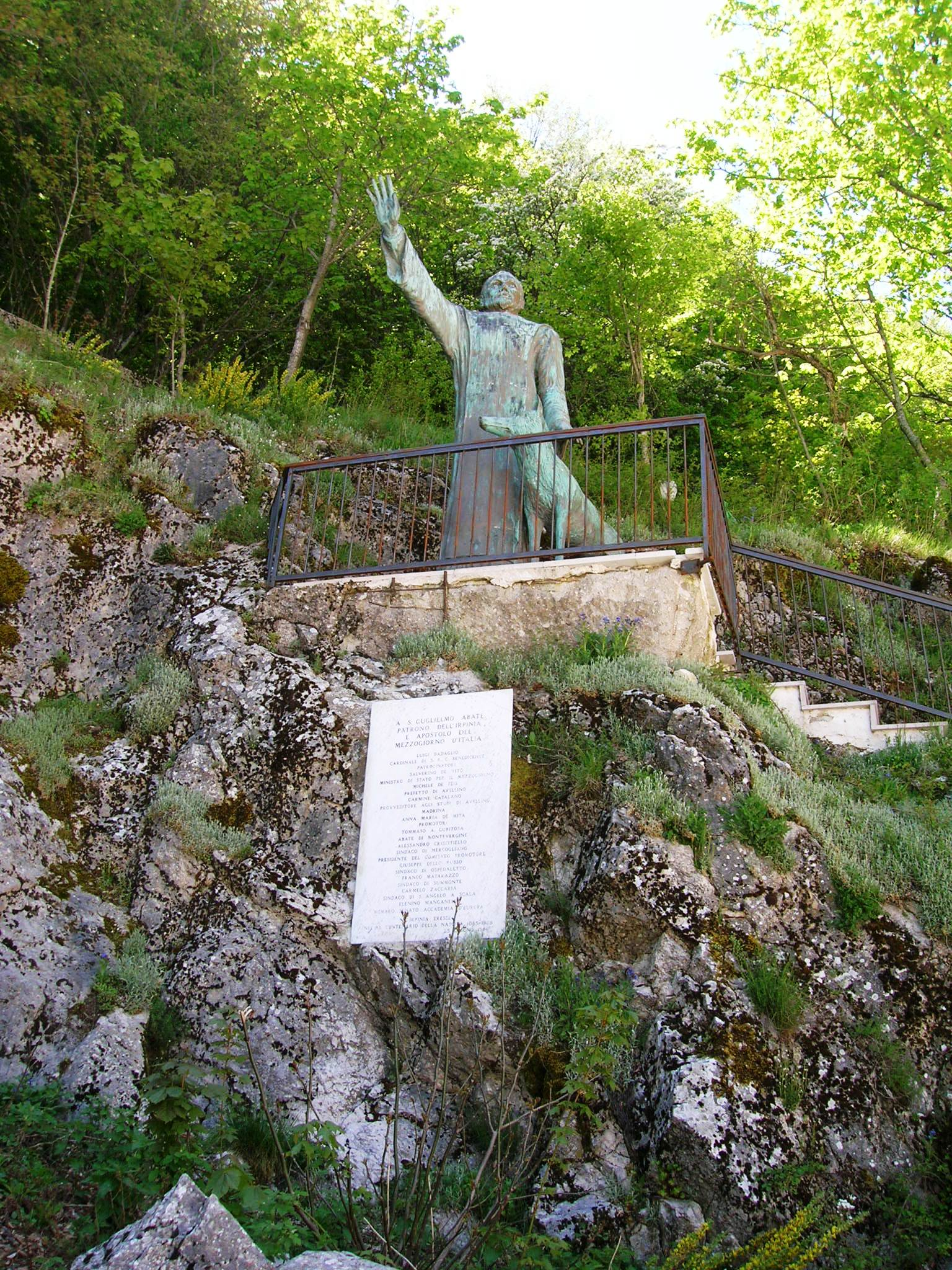
Statue of William

The history of the sanctuary of Montevergine is closely linked to the figure of William of Montevergine, a hermit monk who lived between the 11th and 12th centuries, who took pilgrimages to places of Christianity. Returning to Italy after a long journey to Santiago de Compostela, he decided to undertake a new pilgrimage to Jerusalem and to prepare himself spiritually he took refuge at Mount Serico, in Atella, where he is the protagonist of the healing of a blind man. Resuming the journey towards the holy land, he arrives in Ginosa, meeting with John of Matera, who advises him to give up the pilgrimage and to work for the divine service in the lands of the West: William refuses the advice of the saint and continues with his walk until he is beaten up by a group of brigands. Remembering John's words and after a long spiritual reflection, he understands the new path to follow, that is to retire in solitude and devote himself to meditation. Arriving in Irpinia, he feels that God's will is to make him reside on a mountain, known today as Partenio, at an altitude of over a thousand meters.

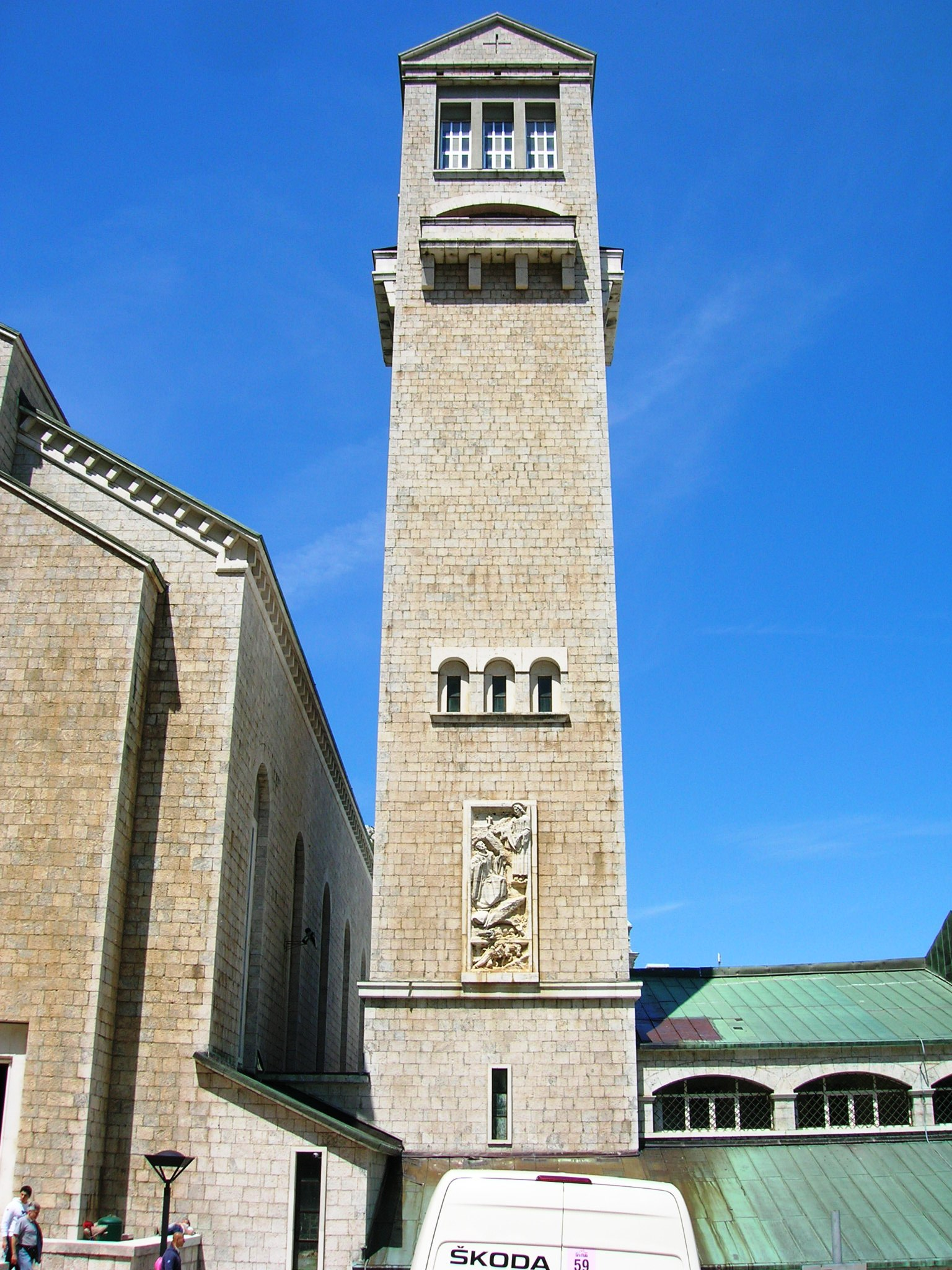
The bell tower

Over time, William's reputation for holiness increased more and more, so much so that men eager to embrace a lifestyle dedicated to prayer and solitude began to arrive spontaneously on the mountain. In a short time numerous cells, mostly made with mud and mortar, housed numerous monks. At the same time it was also decided to build a church, consecrated in 1126, dedicated to the Madonna, but, contrary to what is often told, no apparitions occurred: William only followed his deep devotion to the Virgin Mary. Soon the monks of Montevergine gathered in a congregation called Verginiana, officially recognized on 8 August 1879 by Pope Leo XIII: over the centuries the congregation has carried out both evangelization service, even using the local dialect to reach the lowest classes of society, and care for the sick, with the construction of numerous hospitals in Campania and in the rest of southern Italy. After the death of St. William in 1142, the sanctuary reached its heyday between the 12th and 14th centuries, when it was enriched with numerous works of art and expanded considerably thanks to the offerings of feudal lords, popes and kings: it was in this period that the painting of the Madonna was donated, now venerated in the cathedral basilica, but also numerous relics, including the bones of San Gennaro, which were then transferred to the cathedral of Naples in 1497.

Between 1378 and 1588 the sanctuary of Montevergine experienced a profound crisis both from a spiritual and economic point of view, accentuated by a commendation of 1430, which assigned the offerings made for the abbey to men without any Christian interest. From 1588 until the beginning of the 19th century, monastic life was fairly peaceful, although in 1611 the guesthouse was seriously damaged by a fire and in 1629 the central nave of the church collapsed; from 1807, the year in which the body of William of Montevergine was moved from the abbey of Goleto to Sant'Angelo dei Lombardi in Montevergine, to 1861 a new period of crisis seriously endangered the life of the congregation itself: on 28 May 1868 the council of state decreed that the abbeys should not be subject to any type of economic suppression and therefore all the assets confiscated in the previous years were returned again; in the same year the sanctuary was declared a national monument, while in 1884 the meteorological station of Montevergine was inaugurated

At the beginning of the twentieth century the situation improved considerably and the sanctuary enjoyed the ancient fame, becoming one of the most visited in Southern Italy; During the Second World War, precisely from 1939 to 1946, it secretly hosted the Shroud of Turin, not only to protect it from the bombings but also to hide it in the event that Adolf Hitler would want to take possession of it. On 8 April 1944, the Sanctuary received the visit of King Victor Emmanuel III of Italy who resided in Ravello, who came to thank the sanctuary for the custody of the Shroud and other treasures owned by the House of Savoy.

Remarkable changes made in this period include the renovation of the Forestry, the Monastery and the ancient basilica, the opening in 1956 of the funicular that connects the center of Mercogliano to the sanctuary in just 7 minutes, the inauguration of the new basilica, designed by Florestano Di Fausto, in 1961, on whose main altar the picture of the Madonna was placed. By architectural criteria, it is a pseudobasilica. Also in the 1960s, the crypt, which contains the remains of San Guglielmo, the Ex-voto room and a museum, were reorganized according to modern standards only in 2000, which collects the numerous archaeological finds or jewels and works of art brought by pilgrims, dates back. or found around the sanctuary; In fact, a temple stood in the Roman era in the Roman area dedicated to Cybele. In addition to the complex that stands on Mount Partenio, the Abbatial Palace of Loreto also belongs to the Sanctuary, located in the center of Mercogliano. Inside there is a pharmacy dating back to 1753 and a library. On 25 June 2012, after an accurate restoration, the painting of the Madonna was again placed inside the ancient basilica, in the chapel dedicated to the Crucifix.

== Structure ==
=== Cathedral basilica ===
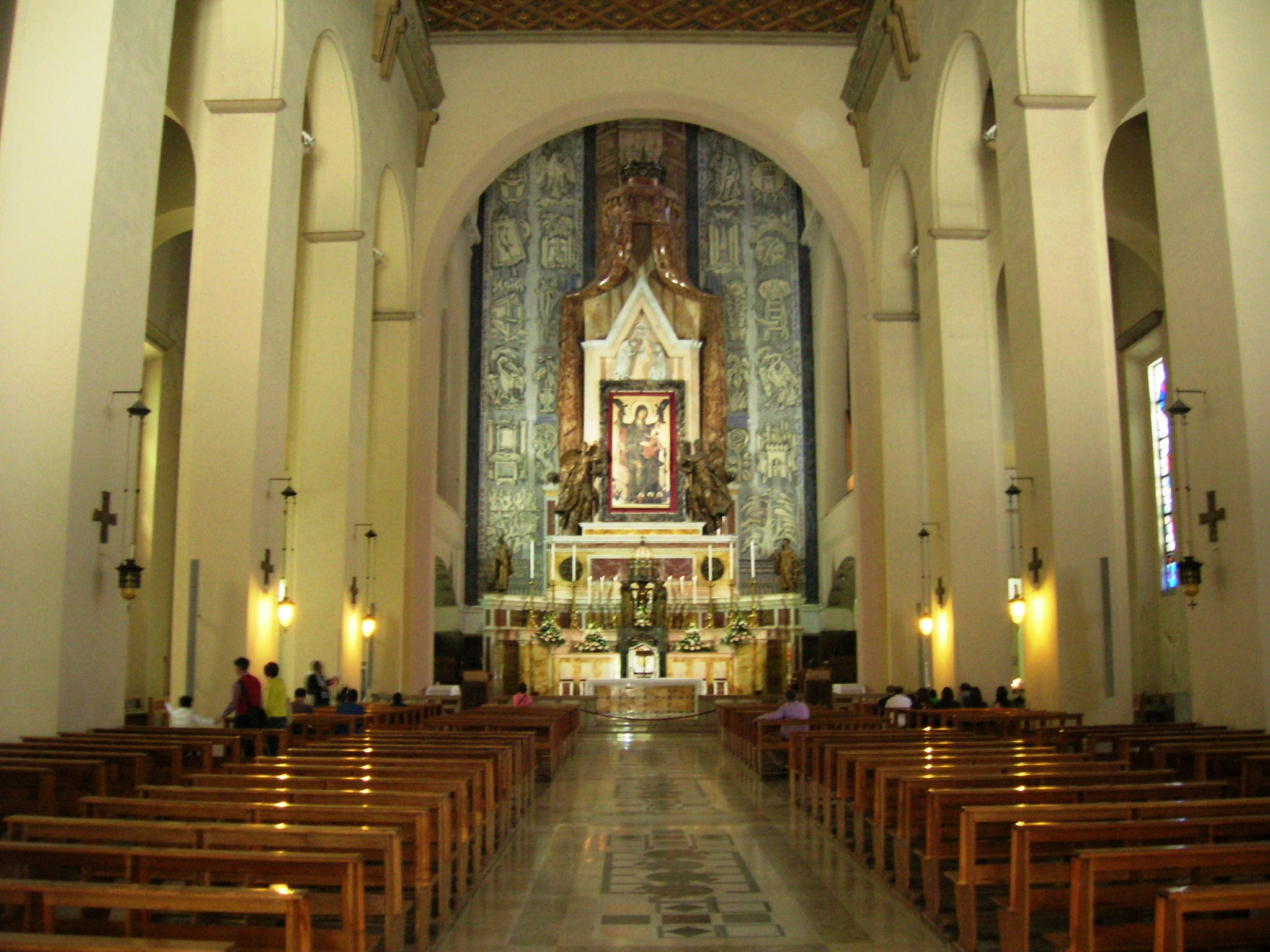
The inside of the basilica

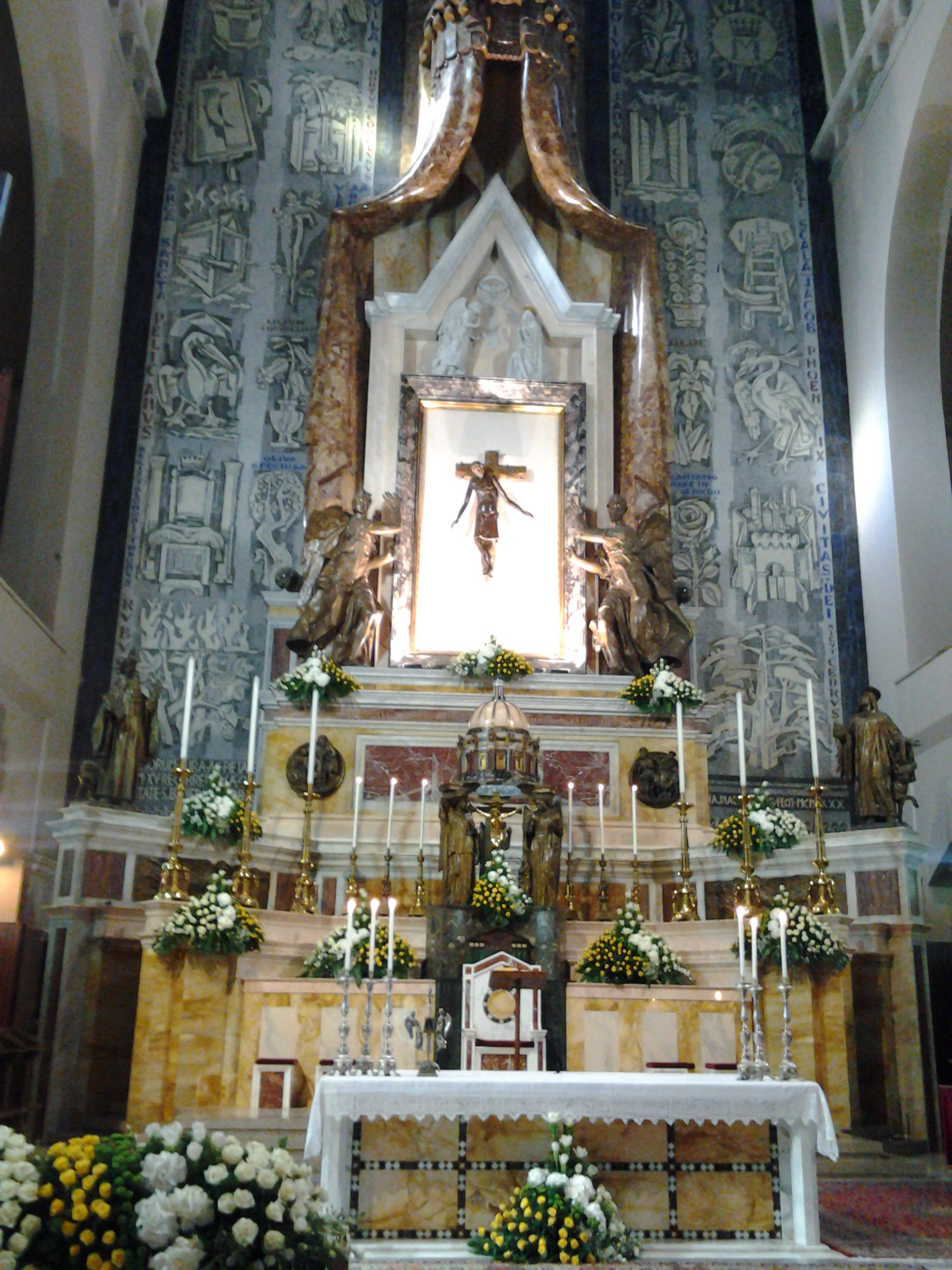
The unnailed crucifix

The construction works of the cathedral basilica began in 1952, ending in 1961 with the solemn consecration on Ascension Day: the basilica is the work of the architect Florestano Di Fausto. The facade, divided into three compartments where the same number of entrances open, is covered in white stone and in the center there is a rose window decorated with polychrome glass depicting the coronation of the Virgin.

Inside there are no particular notable elements, it has a neo-Romanesque style and is made up of three naves, one central and two lateral ones divided by five arches on both sides: at the bottom of the two lateral naves there are two matronea which host the organ. The main altar is enclosed by a wooden choir made of walnut and olive briar, while at the back there is a marble throne where the painting of the Madonna di Montevergine was placed, later replaced by a crucifix without nails: the frame that previously housed the painting it is surrounded by two marble angels who seem to support it; the altar is completed with polychrome marble, bronze bas-reliefs and a mosaic, the work of Hainal.

The ceiling is coffered with pure gold coffering, while the flooring is semi-polished granite. The windows of the dome are adorned with stained glass windows representing Angels created by Amalia Panigati, who was also responsible for the crosses in the matronea symbolizing the Evangelists. From the left nave there is access to a sort of side chapel called the Penitentiary, while at the bottom of the right nave there is access to the old basilica via a Gothic style portal, dating back to the 13th century, whose tympanum is decorated with the descent of the Holy Spirit on the Apostles and Holy Mary during the first Christian Pentecost.

Near the new basilica there is the bell tower, inaugurated in 1925, although part of the facade had already been completed in 1901: approximately 80 meters high and covered in white and gray granite, the lower part is in Ionic style with three arches decorated with columns, while the upper part, where the papal loggia is also located, protected by a marble parapet, is in Corinthian style; internally it is divided into five floors and on the external walls there are some decorations such as trumpeter angels and a marble depiction of the Sacred Heart of Jesus, six meters high.

Matronea host a pipe organ, Mascioni opus 1042, constructed in 1981. The instrument, with electric transmission, has three keyboards of 61 notes each and a concave-radial pedal board of 32 notes.

=== The old basilica ===
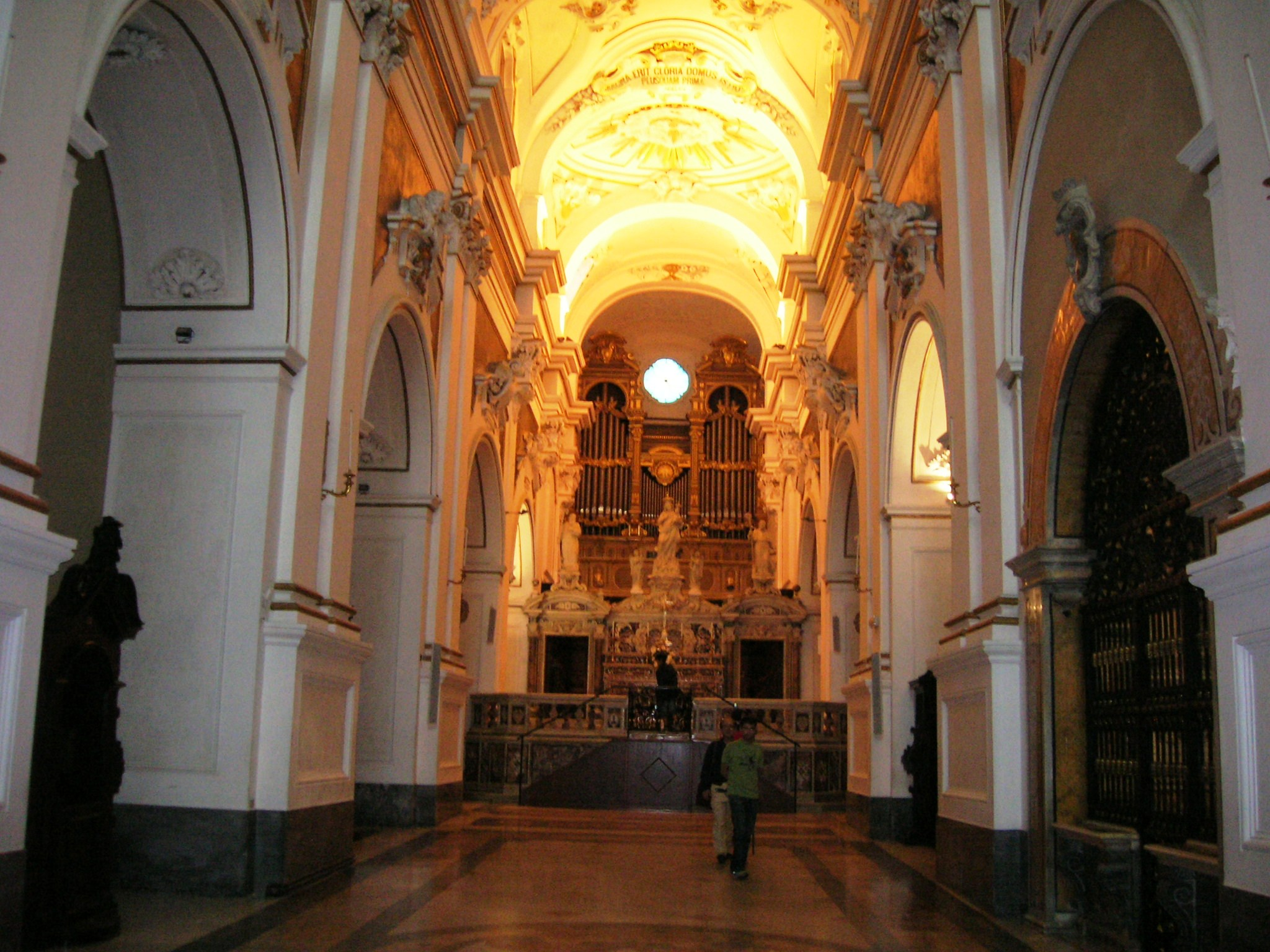
The old basilica

Nothing remains of the ancient basilica, dating back to 1126, built first in Romanesque style, and remodeled in Gothic style: it collapsed in 1629, and was rebuilt in 1645 based on a design by the architect Giacomo Conforti. The entrance to the church starts with a large corner staircase which leads directly into the courtyard of the monastery and is surmounted by an iron portal, the work of the De Lamorte foundry of Naples, realized in 1885, in Gothic style: past the entrance one enters a covered atrium, and then enters directly into the templeThe church has a single nave, paved in marble and is delimited on each side by three large arches, a sign of the past side aisles, now closed; in the ancient basilica there are six marble plaques which respectively recall the history of the sanctuary, thanks to Leo XIII, the visits of Umberto I, the pilgrimage of Vittorio Emanuele III on 28 August 1936, the restoration of the diocese of Montevergine and to Francesco I.

The main altar is adorned with tarsi of the Neapolitan school, which include "typical elements of Arab art": in the central part there is the marble statue of the Madonna delle Grazie, while on its sides the statues, also in marble, of Saint William and Saint Benedict; another noteworthy craftsmanship are the angel-like candelabras, dating back to 1888 and made to replace the original wooden ones. Behind the altar is the walnut wood choir, created by Benvenuto Tortelli in 1573 and characterized by small columns, putti inlaid on the armrests and the Angel with the aspergillum under the central kneeler; The church is closed by an organ by Vincenzo Benvenuti built in 1896.

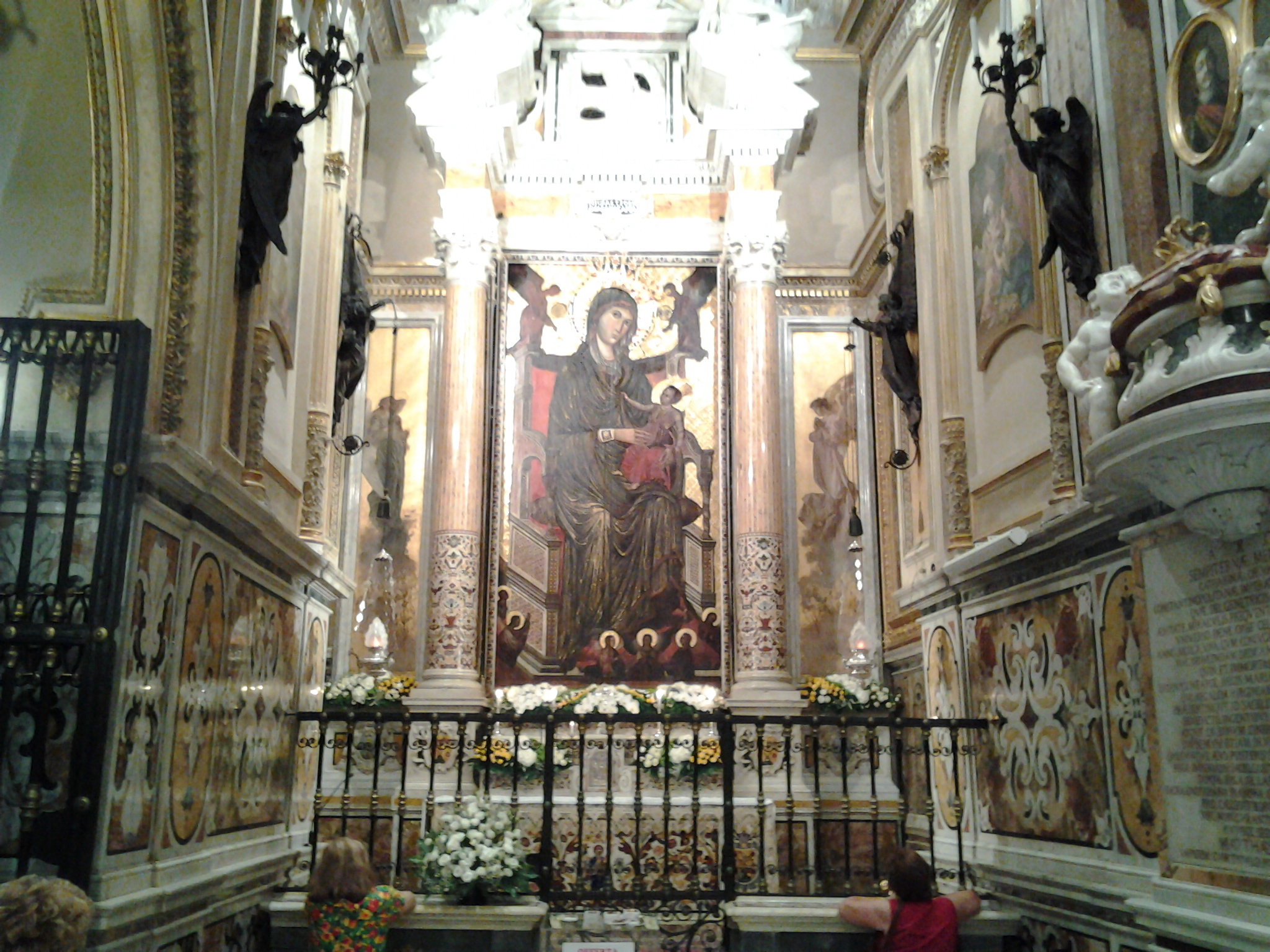
Madonna's chapel

On the right side there is a chapel dedicated to the Blessed Sacrament, inside which there is a canopy dating back to the 13th century, in Romanesque style, with Cosmatesque inlays, a gift from Mary of Hungary or her son Charles Martel: four marble lions support the four columns decorated with an alternation of white and red which symbolically depict the four tributaries of the Danube; on the architrave, in addition to two statues holding the thurible and the aspergillum, eight other small columns support the dome. Under the canopy, the case decorated with angels supporting the ciborium, the work of Luigi III De Capua and dating back to the end of the 15th century. Inside the chapel there is also a pipe organ, built at the end of the 19th century by Zeno Fedeli; with mixed transmission, mechanical for the manuals and the pedal, pneumatic-tubular for the registers, it has a single 56-note keyboard and a straight 27-note pedal board without its own registers.

Another chapel was built around the 13th century by Philip I of Anjou: originally it housed the painting of the Madonna, until 25 November 1960, when the painting was moved to the Cathedral Basilica and the chapel was converted to the cult of the Crucifix; however, on 25 June 2012, it returned to host the effigy of the Virgin. The altar of the chapel dates back to 1628 and is surmounted by two columns, in the center of which was placed an 18th-century crucifix, later replaced by the panel of the Madonna; on the sides of the columns the depictions of Matthew and Luke. The vault is decorated with paintings by Vincenzo Volpe, depicting the Child Mary, the Assumption and the Immaculate Conception: other paintings by the same author on the right side of the chapel including the Apparition of the Savior to San Guglielmo; also of fine workmanship is the funeral monument of Catherine II of Valois, wife of Philip of Anjou and her two children Louis and Maria. Among the other works in the chapel are a marble niche where the remains of Abbot Guglielmo De Cesare are kept, depictions of Saint Bernard, Saint Anselm and a canvas of the Nativity.

Another chapel is that of the Schiodazione (lit. untacking), so called due to the original presence of a 17th-century canvas by Rubens, which was lost following its replacement with a 19th-century one by Serbucci.

On the external square there is the chapel of the Torrione, so called because it is similar to a tower, whose façade was built towards the end of the 19th century based on a design by the architect Carmine Biancardi: it is accessed via a staircase, which if done on ones knees, allows to obtain a partial indulgence; inside is a half-bust of the Redeemer dating back to 1899.

=== Saint William crypt and ex-voto room ===
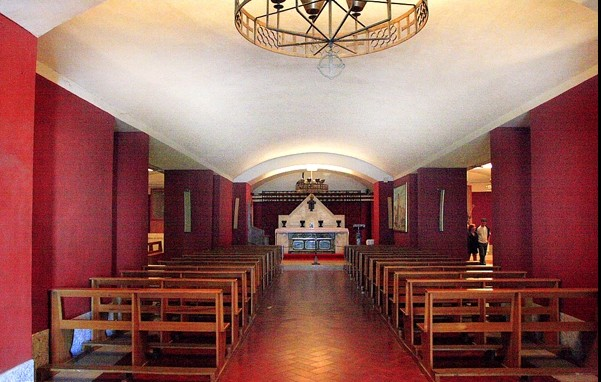
Saint William crypt

The crypt of William of Montevergine was consecrated in 1963 and is divided into three naves: in the central one, under the main altar, the sarcophagus with the remains of the saint is placed and decorated with salient scenes of his earthly existence.In the lateral naves eight chapels open, four on each side, dedicated to the saints, respectively: Pope Eleutherius and Saint Antia, Juliana of Nicomedia and Fausta of Cyzicus, Constantius of Perugia and Saint Deodato, Barbatus of Benevento and Saint Massimo, Saint Jason and Maurus, Saint Mercurius and Potitus, Saint Ermolao and Saint Modesto, Saint Vittore and Priscus of Nocera. In the crypts, collected in urns and placed on the walls, are the relics collected over the years in the Montevergine sanctuary.

In 1961, the year in which the new basilica was inaugurated, a room was also built to accommodate the numerous Ex-votos brought by the pilgrims and which were collected, until the year before, near the painting of the Madonna. Near the room, the body of Blessed Giulio, Monaco of Montevergine, so called by believers but still not recognized by the church: the particularity of his body, kept in a bronze urn, is also placed, is to be still in a good one condition without any treatment from his death, which took place in 1601, and to whom numerous miracles were attributed.

== Worship and pilgrimage ==
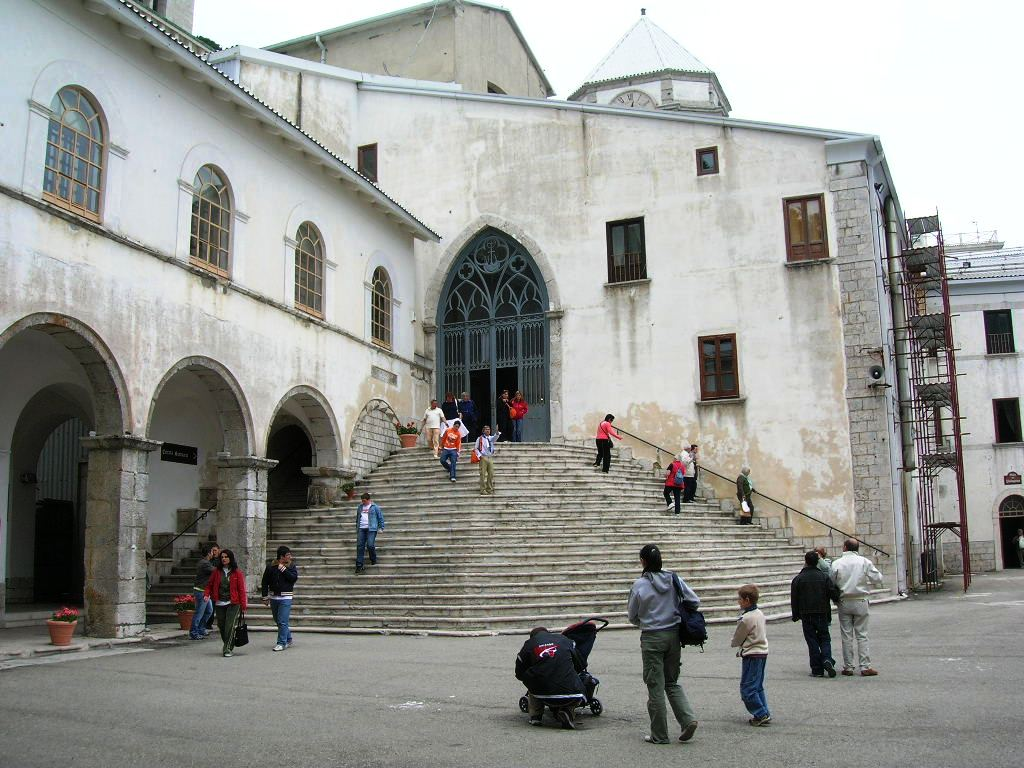
The access stairway to the ancient basilica

Pilgrimages to Montevergine are a deeply rooted tradition not only in Campania, but also throughout the rest of southern Italy: the first evidence of ascents to Mount Partenio already dates back to the time of William of Montevergine when small communities of people came to the church especially to get to know the virtuous saint; A document from 1139 says of pilgrimages that they invoke divine grace and on 12 September 1263, Pope Urban IV, affirmed how the area of Montevergine had become an important center of prayer. The constant flow of pilgrims over the years led to benefits trickling down to local communities, so much so that numerous hostels were built in the area: today this place takes the name of Ospedaletto d'Alpinolo, deriving precisely from the high number of reception centers.

The pilgrimages in the past were carried out both in a carriage and with a cart, on horseback or on foot, they were characterized by fasting or abstinence from meat, eggs and cheese; another tradition had it that unmarried women or girls who went on pilgrimage intertwined broom branches during the climb towards the mountain, promising the Madonna to return the following year and to untie the knot in the company of the groom or even that very young girls went barefoot to the sanctuary on behalf of third parties to thank the Virgin for the grace received. During the descent, the men used to perform a chariot race, called recanata, while the women sang popular songs.

Another festivity felt in the cult of the Madonna di Montevergine, a Black Madonna also called Mamma Schiavona ("Slave Mama"), is the one of Candlemas: it is said that in 1252, during a blizzard, two male lovers had been discovered and left tied to a tree on the mountain to freeze to death: through the intercession of the Virgin, a sudden ray of sunshine struck the ice, melting it and saving the lovers. Every year, on the occasion of 12 September (Most Holy Name of the Blessed Virgin Mary) and 2 February (Candlemas), gays, lesbians and trans people pay homage to Mamma Schiavona with a pilgrimage to the sanctuary, called juta dei femminielli, to then participate, together with the other pilgrims, in the dances, above all tammorriate, taking place in the square in front. The tradition of juta dei femminielli can be traced back to at least 1611, when following a fire in the church, some of over 400 bodies found were men in women's clothes and women in men's clothes. The link between femminielli and Montevergine may be tied to the place's earlier identity as the temple of Cybele, goddess worshipped by eunuch Galli priests.

Since the mid-nineteenth century, the sanctuary of Montevergine has also been associated with the sale of nougats, hazelnuts and wicker baskets made on site.

== Bibliography ==
- Bourcard, Francesco de (1853). Usi e costumi di Napoli e contorni descritti e dipinti [Customs and traditions of Naples and its surroundings described and painted] (in Italian). Vol. 1. Naples: Stabilimento tipografico di Geatano Nobile.
- Puntoni, Paolo (1993). Parla Vittorio Emanuele III (in Italian). Bologna: Il Mulino.
