= Williamites =

Williamites may refer to either of two minor Roman Catholic religious orders or congregations:

- Benedictine Williamites of Monte Vergine
- Hermits of Saint William

Or may refer to:

- the "Williamite" followers of King William III of England
