= Ospedaletto =

Ospedaletto may refer to several locations in Italy:

- Ospedaletto, Trentino
- Ospedaletto d'Alpinolo
- Ospedaletto Euganeo
- Ospedaletto Lodigiano
- Ospedaletto, a village divided between the comuni of Vicenza and Bolzano Vicentino

== See also ==
- Chiesa del Ospedaletto, a church in Venice
- San Diego all'Ospedaletto, Naples
- Ospedaletti, a comune in Liguria
