= Abbey of San Guglielmo al Goleto =

Abbey in Sant'Angelo dei Lombardi, Italy

Coordinates: 40°54′21″N 15°08′36″E

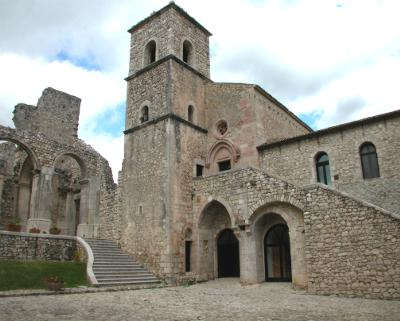
The Abbey of San Guglielmo al Goleto.

The Abbey of San Guglielmo al Goleto is a Benedictine monastery in Sant'Angelo dei Lombardi, province of Avellino, region of Campania Italy.

The monastery was founded by Saint William of Vercelli in the year 1114. It was started as a female cloister, with a small attached monastery for the spiritual guidance and economic assistance of the nuns.

The period 1135-1515 was known as the "Age of the Nuns." The cloister became wealthy from 1135 to 1348 until the black death struck and the cloister began to decline. On January 24, 1506, Pope Julius II declared that, upon the death of the last abbess, the cloister would be closed, which occurred in 1515.

The age of the nuns was followed by the "epoch of the monks" from 1515 to 1807. When the cloister closed, the monastery merged with that on Montevergine and began to grow. Pope Sixtus V, who was also superior of the Franciscan Convent of S. Angelo dei Lombardi, accelerated this growth. The monastery reached its peak between the mid-seventeenth century and the mid-eighteenth century.

In 1807, the king of Naples, Joseph Bonaparte, ordered the Abbey closed. St. William's body was moved to Montevergine and the furnishings of the abbey were looted.

The abbey remained abandoned until 1973 when a monk of Montevergine, Lucio M. De Marino, obtained permission to relocate to Goleto, reoccupying the abbey and beginning its restoration.

In 1989, the Abbey was entrusted to the Little Brothers of Jesus Caritas. They resided there until July 2021.

== See also ==
- Roman Catholic Archdiocese of Sant'Angelo dei Lombardi-Conza-Nusco-Bisaccia
