= Mercogliano =

- Comune
- Città di Mercogliano
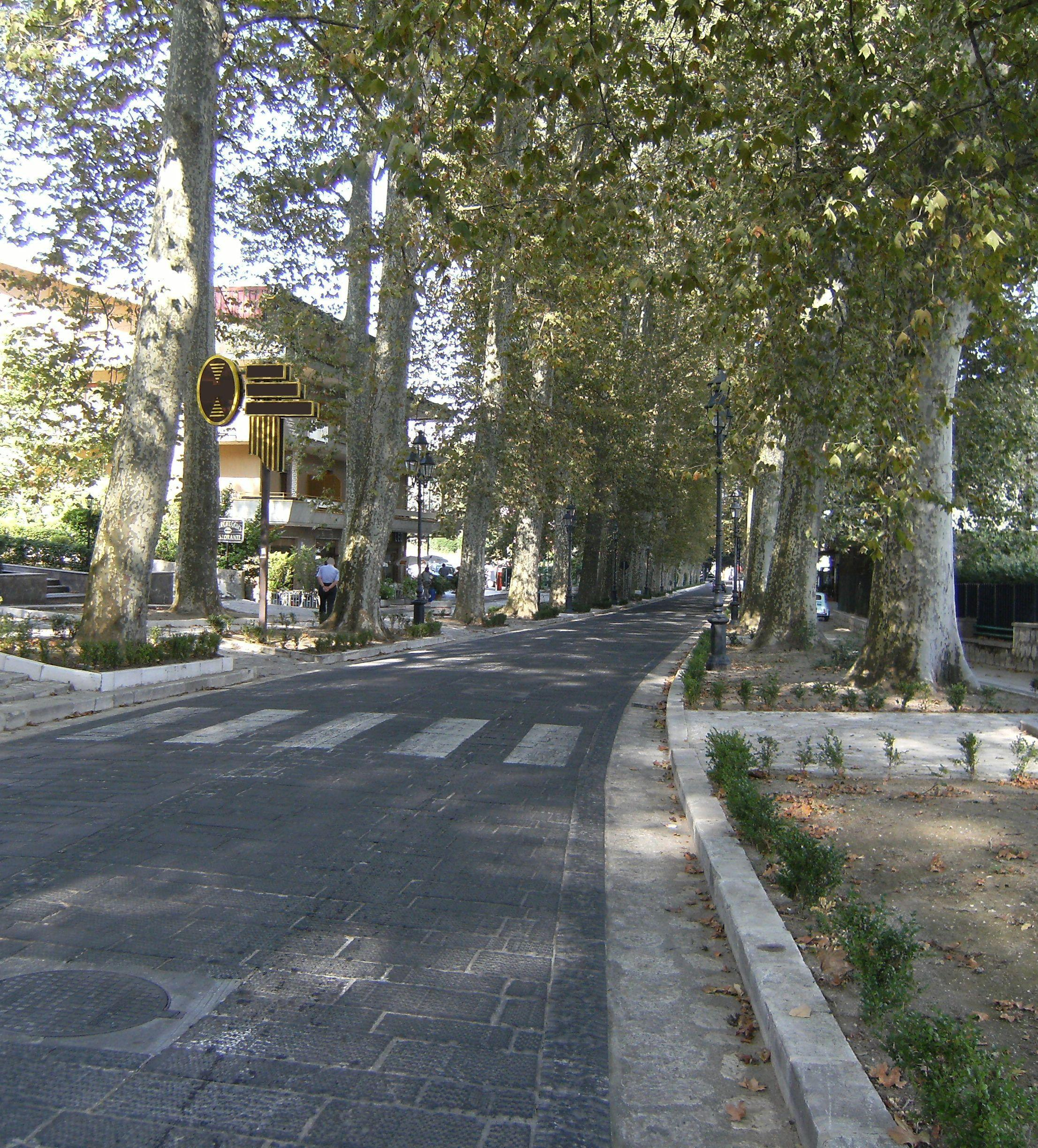
- The central street Via San Modestino

- Location within Italy Location within Campania
- Coordinates: 40°55′33″N 14°44′34″E
- Country: Italy
- Region: Campania
- Province: Avellino (AV)
- Frazioni: Montevergine, Torelli, Torrette

Government
  - Mayor: Vittorio D'Alessio

Area
  - Total: 19.76 km^{2} (7.63 sq mi)
- Elevation: 550 m (1,800 ft)

Population (31 March 2022)
  - Total: 11,567
  - Density: 585.4/km^{2} (1,516/sq mi)
- Demonym: Mercoglianesi
- Time zone: UTC+1 (CET)
  - Summer (DST): UTC+2 (CEST)
- Postal code: 83013
- Dialing code: 0825
- Patron saint: San Modestino
- Saint day: February 14
- Website: Official website

Mercogliano is an Italian town and comune in the province of Avellino, Campania, southern Italy.

== Geography ==
Mercogliano is a hill town located near the western suburb of Avellino and below Mount Partenio (or Montevergine). The municipality borders Avellino, Monteforte Irpino, Mugnano del Cardinale, Ospedaletto d'Alpinolo, Quadrelle and Summonte.

It counts three hamlets (frazioni):

- Montevergine, located near the summit of Mount Partenio and home of the homonym sanctuary, linked to Mercogliano by the Montevergine funicular
- Torelli, a village located on the road between Torrette and Mercogliano
- Torrette, located on a plain next to Avellino. It is the commercial hub of the municipality. The exit "Avellino Ovest" (Av. West) of the A16 motorway serves the locality.

== Main sights ==
- Catholic Sanctuary of Montevergine
- Loreto Abbey Palace near Torelli

== See also ==
- Montevergine funicular
- Pacello da Mercogliano
