= Order of Monte Vergine =

The Benedictine Williamites, more often known by the name of its chief house, Territorial Abbey of Montevergine in central Italy, was a Catholic monastic order.

Besides Monte Vergine, St. William of Vercelli founded a considerable number of monasteries, especially in the Kingdom of Naples, including a double monastery for men and women at Goleto (near Nusco). Pope Celestine III confirmed the congregation by a bull (4 November 1197). In 1611 there were 26 larger and nineteen smaller Williamite houses. Benedict XIV confirmed new constitutions in 1741 to be added to the declarations on the Rule of St. Benedict prescribed by Clement VIII.

The mother-house, the only surviving member of the congregation, was affiliated to the Cassinese Congregation of the Primitive Observance in 1879. The community at Monte Vergine retains the white colour of the habit, which is in other respects like that of the Benedictines.

There are said to have been some 50 Williamite nunneries, of which only two survived at the beginning of the eighteenth century. The habit was white with a black veil, and their rule very severe in the matter of fasting and abstinence.
