= Sant'Angelo dei Lombardi =

Sant'Angelo dei Lombardi Sant'Angelo
- Comune
- Comune di Sant'Angelo dei Lombardi
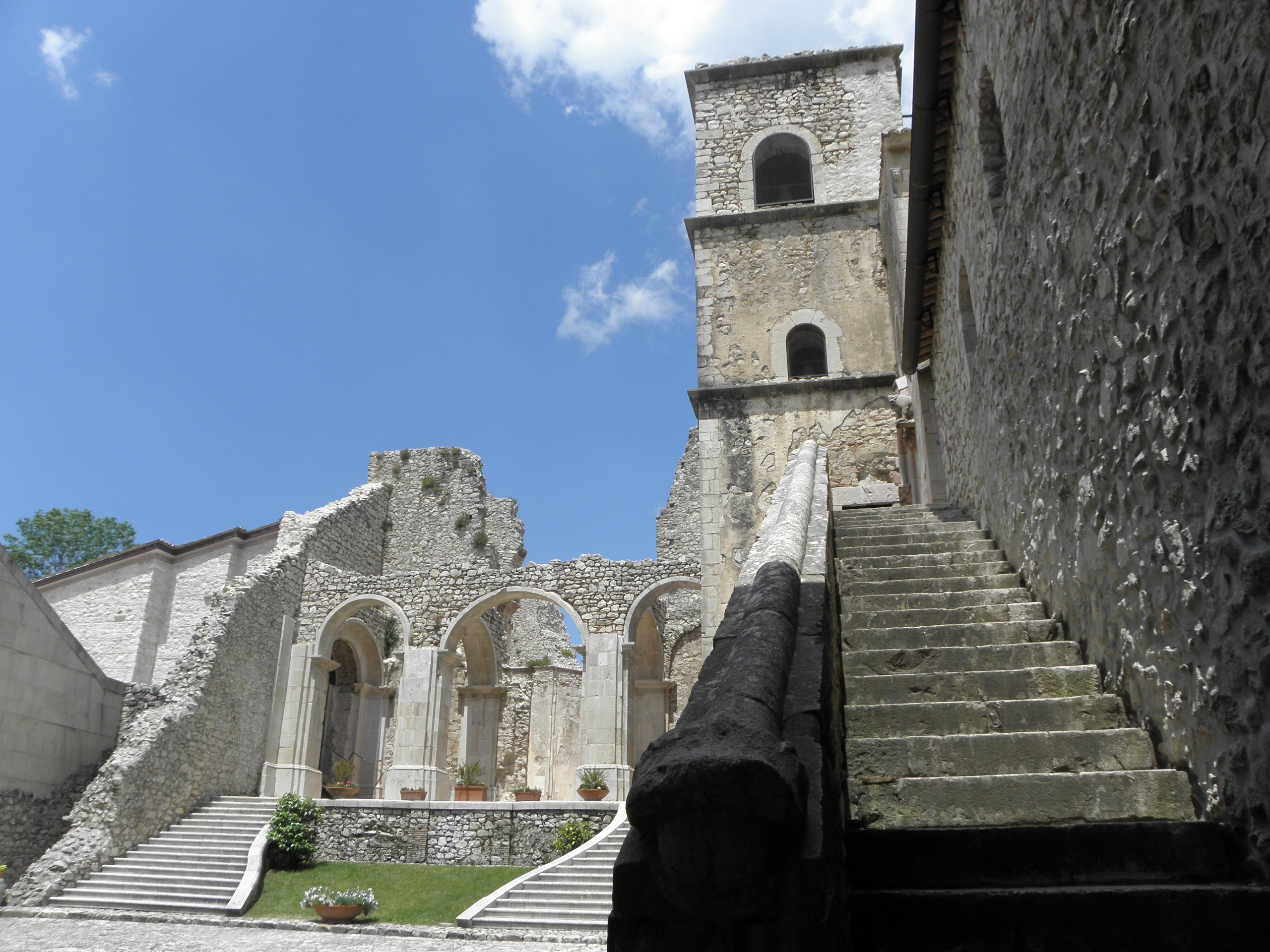
- View of the Goleto Abbey.

- Coat of arms

- Location within Italy Location within Campania
- Coordinates: 40°56′N 15°11′E
- Country: Italy
- Region: Campania
- Province: Avellino (AV)
- Frazioni: See list

Government
  - Mayor: Marco Marandino

Area
  - Total: 55.11 km^{2} (21.28 sq mi)
- Elevation: 875 m (2,871 ft)

Population (13 December 2017)
  - Total: 4,207
  - Density: 76.34/km^{2} (197.7/sq mi)
- Demonym: Santangiolesi
- Time zone: UTC+1 (CET)
  - Summer (DST): UTC+2 (CEST)
- Postal code: 83054
- Dialing code: 0827
- ISTAT code: 064092
- Patron saint: Michael the Archangel
- Saint day: 29 September
- Website: Official website

Sant'Angelo dei Lombardi is a town and comune in the province of Avellino in the Campania region of southern Italy. It has been a historical site of significance in the history of Southern Italy.

== Geography ==
Just on a hilltop near the Fredano River, the town is home to a cathedral and a Lombard castle. The town is bordered by Guardia Lombardi, Lioni, Morra De Sanctis, Nusco, Rocca San Felice, Torella dei Lombardi and Villamaina.

Nearby is the Benedictine Abbey of San Guglielmo al Goleto.

== Notable people ==
Charles A. Gargano, Italian-American businessman and former U.S. Ambassador to Trinidad and Tobago

William of Montevergine, Piedmontese priest and saint who founded the Abbey of San Guglielmo al Goleto in Sant’Angelo.

== Earthquake and reconstruction ==
The town was virtually destroyed by the magnitude 6.9 Irpina earthquake of 23 November 1980, which killed 300 people, including 27 children in an orphanage, and 80% of the town was destroyed in the earthquake. A scandal emerged when rampant corruption and government neglect of the town's reconstruction after the earthquake was investigated by the government.

== History ==
The name "Sant'Angelo" comes from the town's patron Saint Michael the Archangel, and "Lombardi" comes from migrant workers of Lombardy settling there around 1000 AD. Most modern "Santangiolesi" have features and genes similar to the Lombards, as most of the town has been to this day inhabited with the descendants of those migrant workers. The cathedral, originally built in the 11th century, was rebuilt in the 16th century. Also near Piazza d'Andrea is the castle of the Lombards, built around the first half of the 10th century. Initially, it was a jail/prison/fort and was later modified to serve as a castle. There is a small pathway that was constructed under the castle and from there it leads to the main town square where there was an underground prison. In the late 1800s, many people from the town immigrated to Brazil and the United States.

The area is known to have been inhabited by the Samnites and then for a long time by the Romans, who had settled in nearby Aeclanum along the Via Appia, which connected Rome with the port of Brindisi. With the fall of the Roman Empire, Central Italy was conquered by the Lombards and the Fredane River was the border between the Duchy of Benevento and the Lombards of Salerno who began the construction of the castle of Sant’Angelo dei Lombardi at the highest point guarding the border.

In the early 10th century, Sant'Angelo dei Lombardi was besieged by the Saracens and then conquered by the Normans who fortified the castle in 1076. The Normans had come from Northern Europe to Southern Italy after the Church called them since it wanted wanted to impose the Latin rite to replace the Orthodox rites. The Normans favoured the construction of churches, such as the cathedral of Sant'Antonino Martyr, and of monasteries. In 1133, thanks to the Abbot San Guglielmo da Vercelli, the construction of the great Abbey of San Guglielmo al Goleto began, which included a section for men and one for women. It is said that the saint had lived for years in a tree trunk and decided to start the convent of a female cloister. Then, he realized he had to provide for the nuns' sustenance with a male monastery.

True feudalism began with the Normans, and Sant'Angelo dei Lombardi was given as a fief to the Balvano, who descended from the Franks, and the church organized its own administrative structure by creating a bishop's seat. During the Swabian and Angevin Periods, other families alternated with the fief of Sant'Angelo dei Lombardi such as the Ianvilla, also of French origin, and the Di Sangro.

The Black Death brought misery, and the decline of the monastery was such that Pope Julius II in 1506 suppressed the female section and allowed the male section to continue. Joan II, Queen of Naples, assigned the fief to the Caracciolos and a period of splendour arrived with th family around the 1500s.

In 1664, a disastrous earthquake razed the village and the cathedral to the ground, and in the reconstruction, the castle was transformed into a residence by the Caracciolo family. The monastery was then completely renovated with the construction of a new church designed by the great Neapolitan Baroque artist and architect Domenico Antonio Vaccaro. The cathedral was also rebuilt in the Baroque style.

In 1768, the imperial family arrived and then the Carafa family. During the Napoleonic period, Sant'Angelo dei Lombardi became an important administrative centre with the creation of a court and prisons in the castle. Feudalism was abolished, the monastery was closed and fell into ruin and many of its assets were plundered. Fortunately, the remains of the founder, William of Montevergine, were moved to Montevergine.

The village actively participated in the Carbonari uprisings, but the dreams of its citizens were shattered. In fact, after the unification of Italy, disappointment and misery led to a strong wave of migration to the United States of people who went in search of fortune. Emigration continued after the world wars. Fate was not merciful, and Sant'Angelo dei Lombardi was one of the centres most affected by the disastrous earthquake of November 23, 1980, which practically razed it to the ground. After its reconstruction, the castle has once again taken on its mediaeval form and is now home to the archive and museum.

== See also ==
- Roman Catholic Archdiocese of Sant'Angelo dei Lombardi-Conza-Nusco-Bisaccia
