= Montevergine funicular =

Funicular railway in Campania, Italy

Coordinates: 40.923213°N 14.74443°E

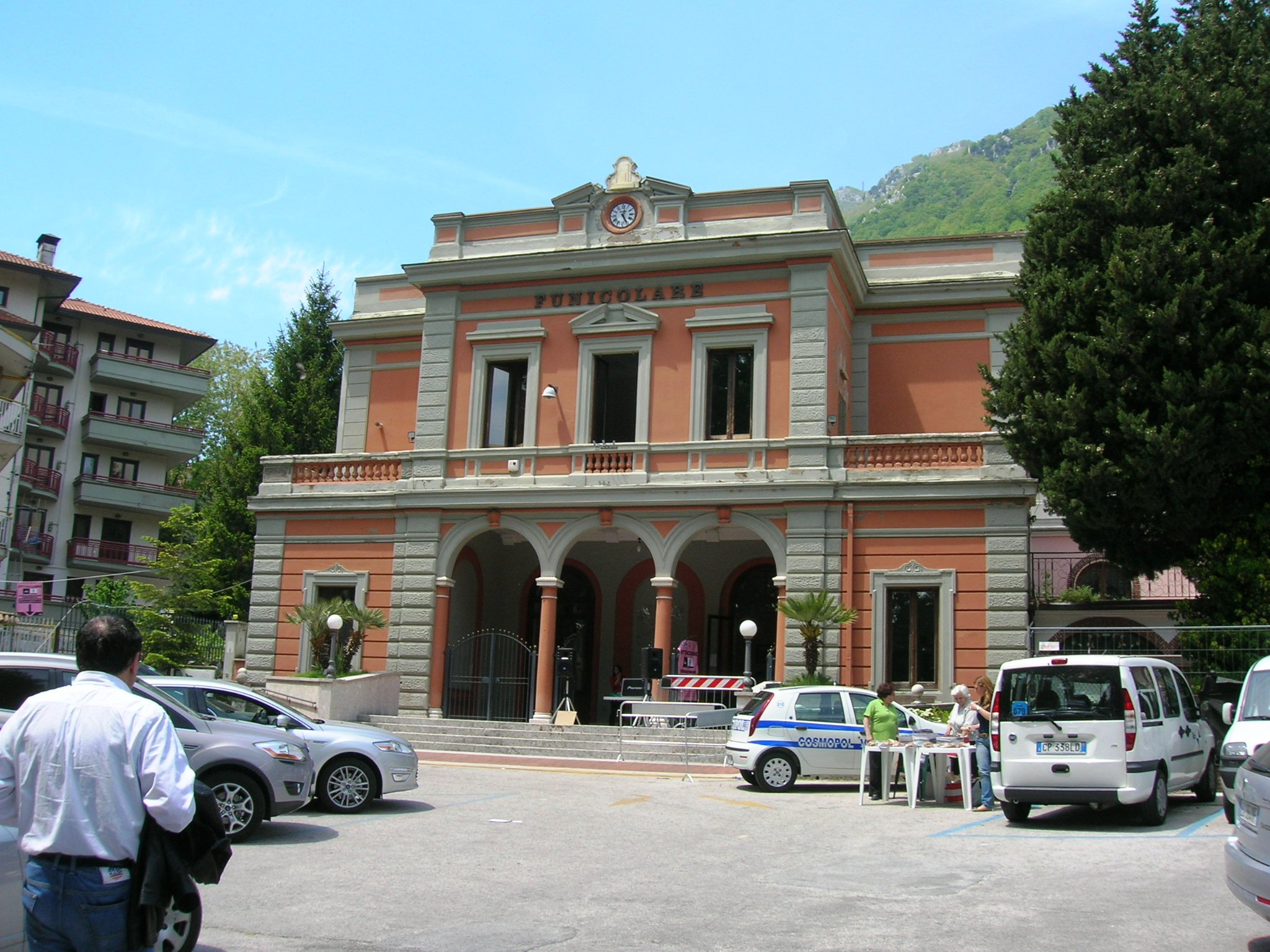
- Exterior of the lower station

Overview
- Owner: Region of Campania
- Locale: Campania, Italy
- Termini: Mercogliano; Montevergine
- Stations: 2

Service
- Type: Funicular
- Services: 1
- Operator(s): Autoservizi Irpini

History
- Opened: 1956

Technical
- Line length: 1,669 m (5,476 ft)
- Maximum incline: 66%

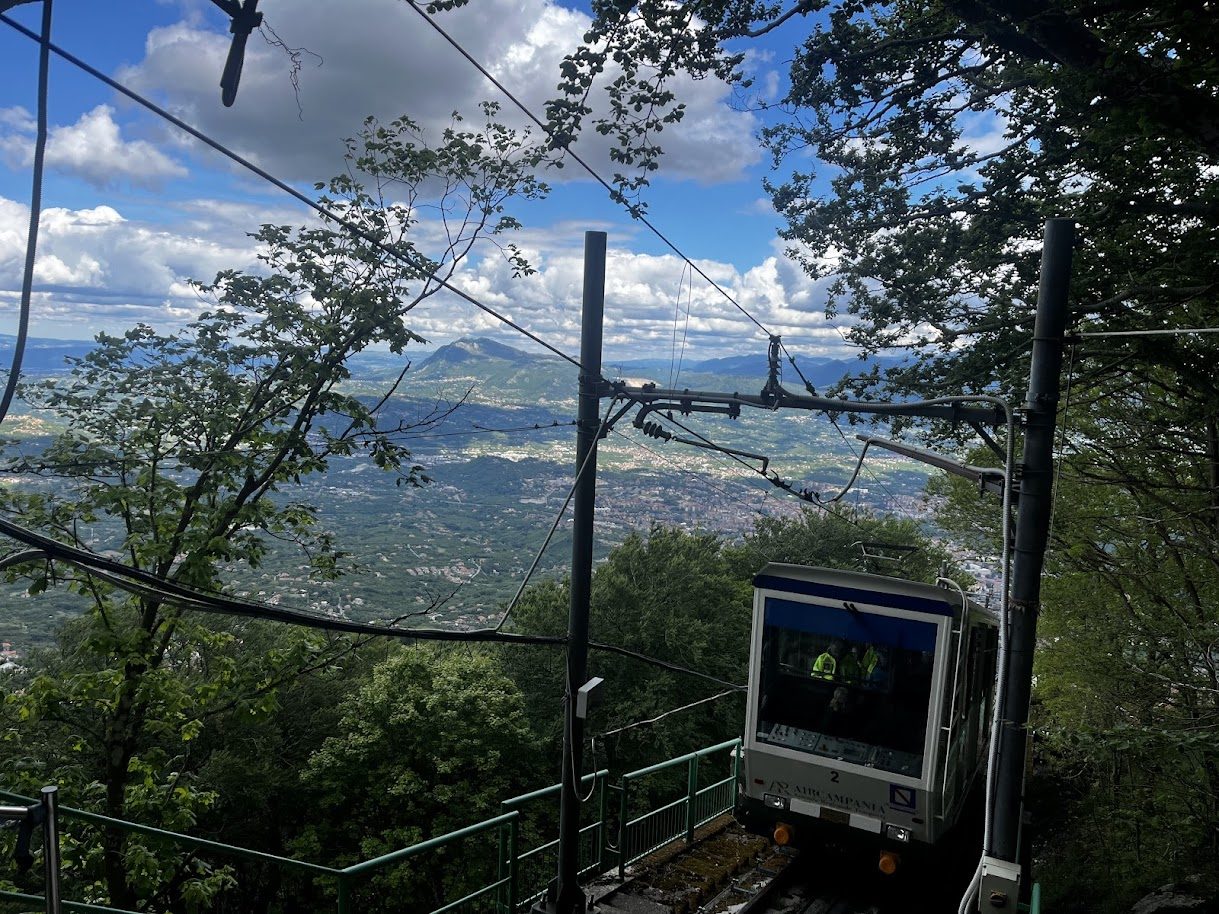
Car entering the upper station

The Montevergine funicular (Italian: Funicolare di Montevergine) is a funicular railway that connects the town of Mercogliano with the mountain and catholic sanctuary of Montevergine, in Campania, Italy.

== History ==
The idea of linking the shrine of Montevergine with the centre of Mercogliano via a funicular railway originated in the nineteenth century, based on an idea of Abbot Guglielmo De Cesare. By 1882 a third of the construction work had already been achieved, but as a result of economic problems and the outbreak of the First World War the work was interrupted. It was not until 1926 that the work was restarted, under the direction of Abbot Ramiro Marcone, who founded a company to complete the line. In 1929 the company, the property of the monastic community, changed its name to the Società Immobiliare Irpina, and obtained the concession to run the funicular for 50 years.

The outbreak of World War II stopped the work once again, and the system was only opened only in 1956 by Abbot Ludovico Anselmo Tranfaglia. In 1973, due to the ageing and deterioration of the line, the Ministry of Transport ordered the line to be closed for renovation, which lasted until the line reopened in 1981. In the meantime the 50 year concession had expired, and the line was purchased by the Region of Campania.

The line reopened on 23 July 2012 after a general overhaul, but was again closed on the 13 October 2012, because of the need for unexpected maintenance and a lack the necessary funds, estimated at €1.5 million, to undertake it. After completion of track restoration and modernisation of the cars, the line reopened on 25 June 2016.

== Operation ==
The line is operated by the Autoservizi Irpini, the regional bus operator, and has the following parameters:

Number of cars	2
Number of stops	2
Configuration	Single track with passing loop
Track length	1,669 metres (5,476 ft)
Rise	734 metres (2,408 ft)
Maximum gradient	66%

The line runs twice an hour on Sundays and public holidays, and every 45 minutes on other days. Service is provided between 09:00 and 17:00.

== See also ==
- List of funicular railways
