= Ospedaletto d'Alpinolo =

- Comune
- Comune di Ospedaletto d'Alpinolo
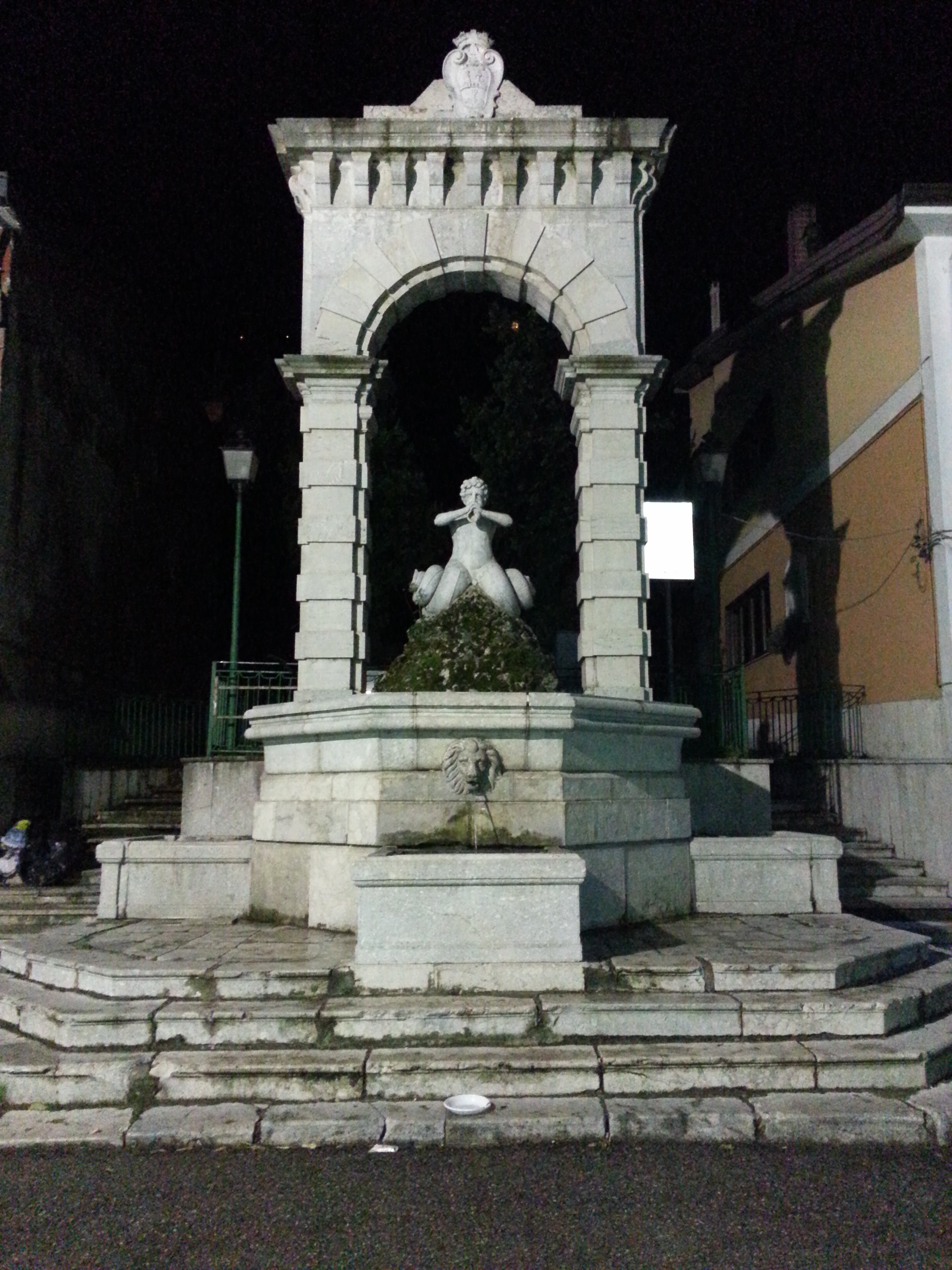

- Location within Italy Location within Campania
- Coordinates: 40°56′N 14°45′E
- Country: Italy
- Region: Campania
- Province: Avellino (AV)
- Frazioni: Avellino, Mercogliano, Summonte

Government
  - Mayor: Antonio Saggese

Area
  - Total: 5.68 km^{2} (2.19 sq mi)

Population (31 March 2022)
  - Total: 2,065
  - Density: 364/km^{2} (942/sq mi)
- Demonym: Ospedalettesi
- Time zone: UTC+1 (CET)
  - Summer (DST): UTC+2 (CEST)
- Postal code: 83014
- Dialing code: 0825
- ISTAT code: 064067
- Patron saint: Saints Filippo and Giacomo
- Saint day: 3 May
- Website: Official website

Ospedaletto D'Alpinolo is a greenwich village, in Italian comune, in the province of Avellino, Campania, southern Italy.
