= Territorial Abbey of Montevergine =

Benedictine abbey in Italy

Coordinates: 40°55′07″N 14°44′59″E

Territorial Abbey of Montevergine Abbatia Territorialis Montisvirginis

Catholic
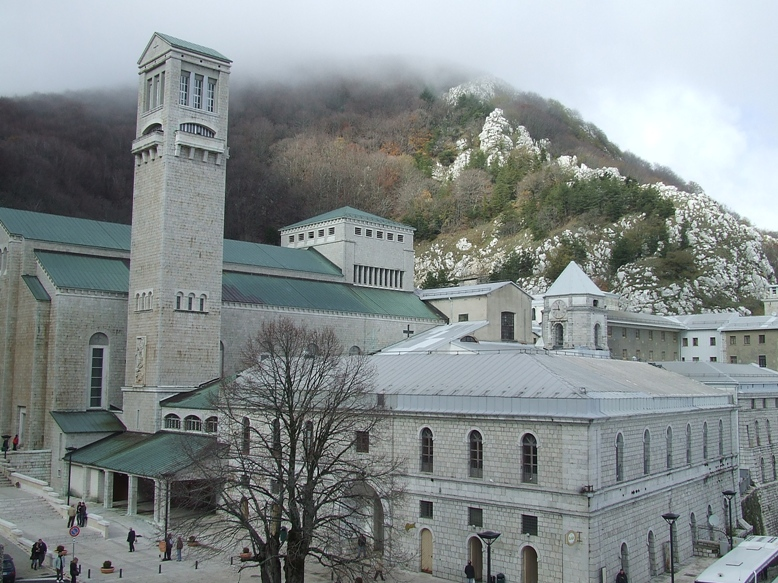
- Cathedral

Location
- Country: Italy
- Ecclesiastical province: Benevento

Statistics
- Area: 48 km^{2} (19 sq mi)
- Population: Total; Catholics: (as of 2004); 16,000; 15,800 (98.8%)

Information
- Rite: Latin Rite
- Established: 12th Century
- Cathedral: Santuario di S. Maria di Montevergine

Current leadership
- Pope: Leo XIV
- Abbot: Riccardo Luca Guariglia, O.S.B.

Website
- www.santuariodimontevergine.com

The Territorial Abbey of Montevergine (Latin: Territorialis Abbatia Montisvirginis) is a Latin Church territorial abbey located in the commune of Montevergine in the ecclesiastical province of Benevento in Italy.

About 1120 William of Vercelli founded an abbey of eremitic inspiration dedicated to the Holy Virgin. It was consecrated in 1124 on Mons Sacer, so called because of the ruins of a temple of Cybele. Catherine of Valois and her son, Louis I of Naples, are buried in the abbey. The new basilica, built in 1961, is home to a 13th-century Byzantine icon of a black Madonna. In 1926 it was established as the Territorial Abbacy of Montevergine.

== Leadership ==
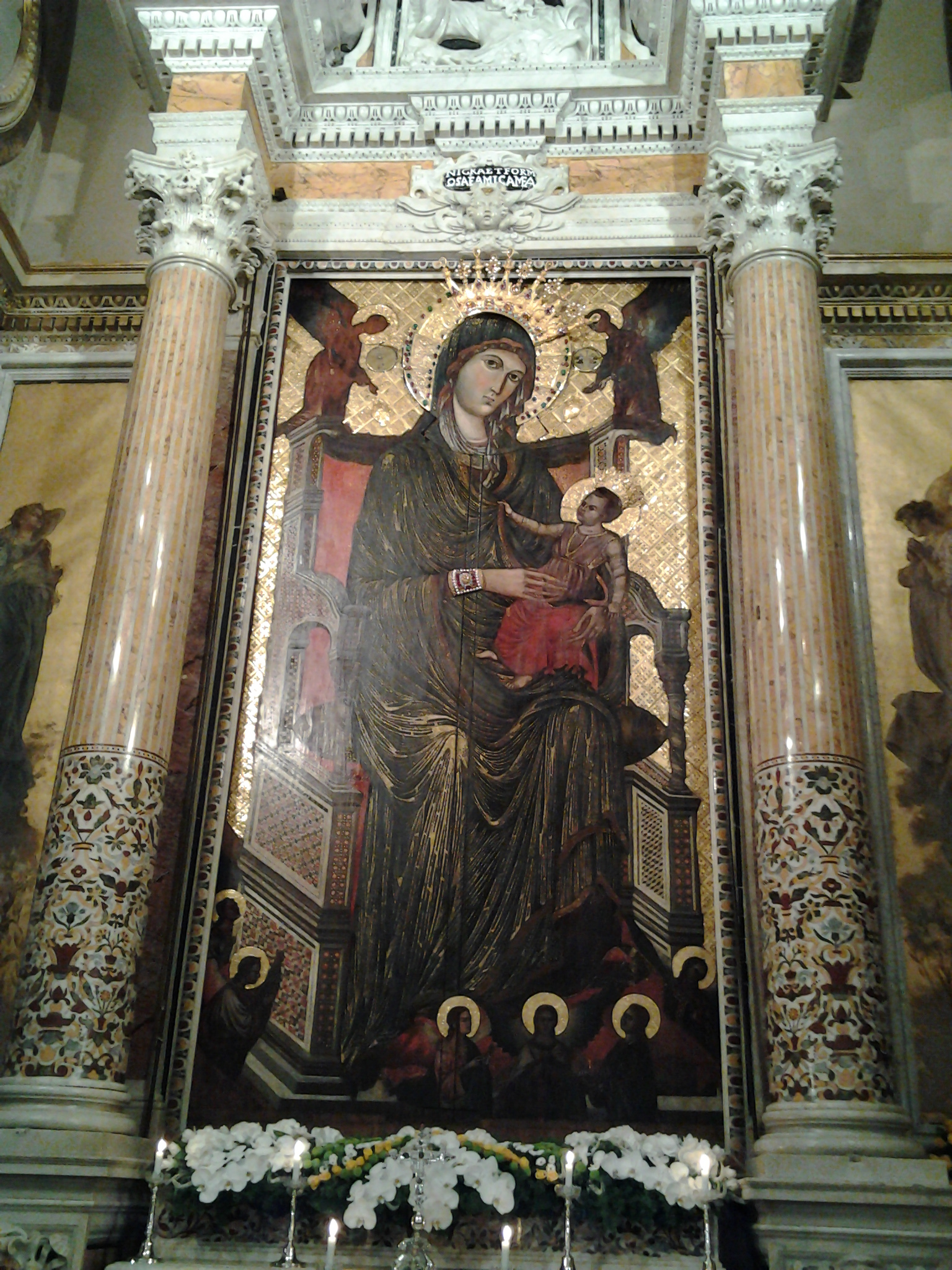
Madonna di Montevergine

- Territorial Abbots of Montevergine (Roman rite)
  - Abbot Riccardo Luca Guariglia, O.S.B.
  - Abbot Beda Umberto Paluzzi, O.S.B. (April 18, 2009 – April 18, 2014)
  - Fr. Beda Umberto Paluzzi, O.S.B. (Apostolic Administrator November 15, 2006 – April 18, 2009)
  - Abbot Tarciscio Giovanni Nazzaro, O.S.B. (June 24, 1998 – November 15, 2006)
  - Abbot Francesco Pio Tamburrino (later Archbishop) (November 29, 1989 – February 14, 1998)
  - Abbot Tommaso Agostino Gubitosa, O.S.B. (October 15, 1979 – 1989)
  - Abbot Anselmo Ludovico Tranfaglia, O.S.B. (December 17, 1952 – 1968)
  - Abbot Giuseppe Ramiro Marcone, O.S.B. (March 11, 1918 – 1952)
  - Abbot Carlo Gregorio Maria Grasso, O.S.B. (later Archbishop) (September 1908 – April 7, 1915)
  - Abbot Vittore Corvaia, O.S.B. (later Bishop) (January 18, 1884 – July 12, 1908)
