= William of Montevergine =

Italian Roman Catholic saint

Saint William of Montevergine OSB
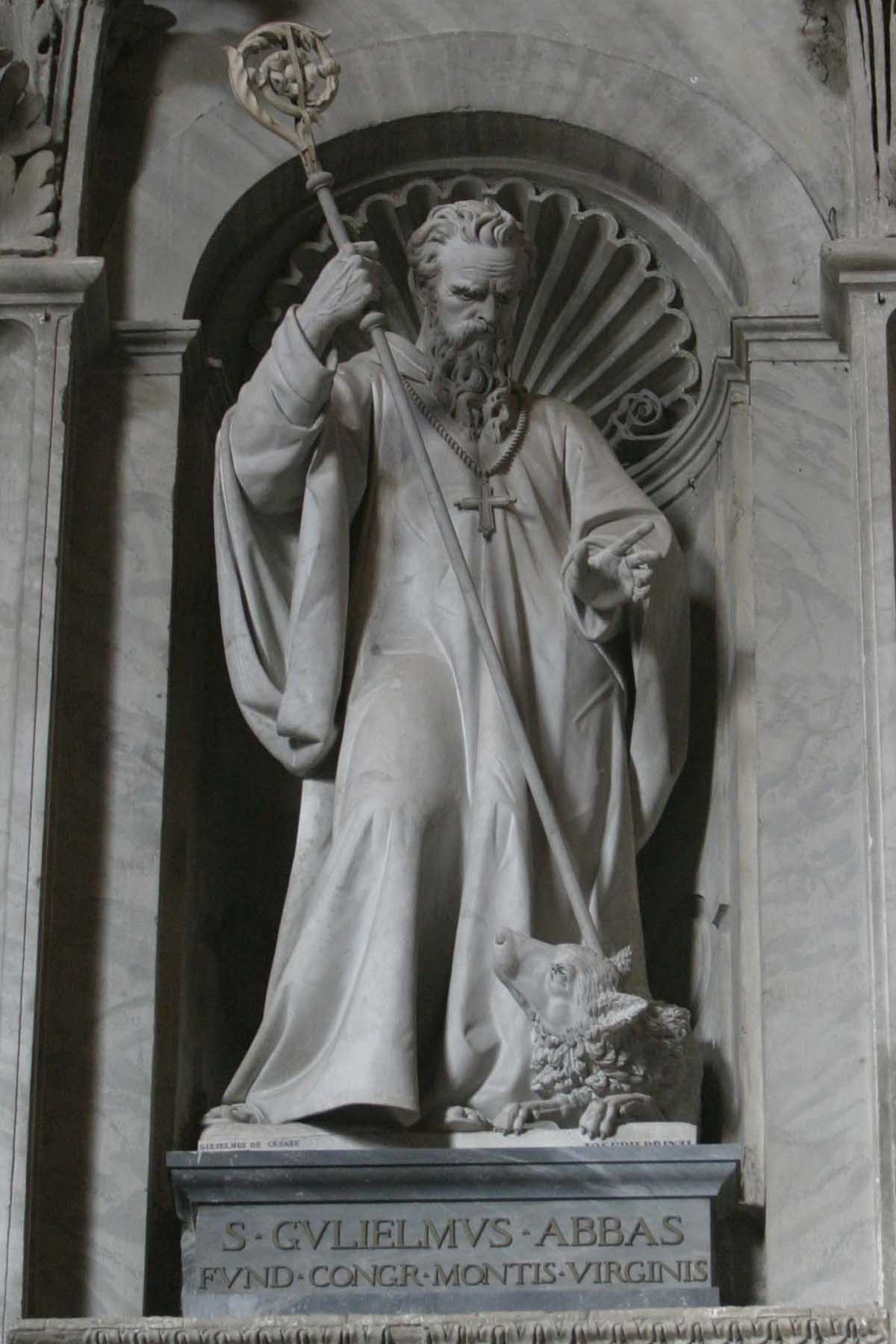
- Saint William of Montevergine's statue at St. Peter's Basilica, Vatican

Confessor
- Born: 1085; Vercelli, Italy
- Died: 25 June 1142; Sant'Angelo dei Lombardi, Italy
- Venerated in: Roman Catholic Church
- Feast: 25 June
- Attributes: wolf; crosier
- Patronage: Irpinia

William of Montevergine, or William of Vercelli, (Italian: Guglielmo) (Latin: Gulielmus) (1085 – 25 June 1142), also known as William the Abbot, was a Catholic hermit and the founder of the Congregation of Monte Vergine, or "Williamites". He is venerated as a saint by the Roman Catholic Church.

== Life ==
He was born in 1085 into a noble family of Vercelli in northwest Italy and was brought up by a relation after the death of his parents. He undertook a pilgrimage to Santiago de Compostela. On his pilgrimage to Compostela, William asked a blacksmith to make an iron implement that would encircle his body and increase his suffering, and he wore it throughout the pilgrimage.

After he returned to Italy, he intended to go to Jerusalem and for this purpose, he reached Southern Italy, but he was beaten up and robbed by thieves. William considered this misfortune a sign of God's will to stay in South Italy and spread the message of Christ. Because of this, he decided not to travel to Jerusalem anymore and to settle in Southern Italy, on the summit of Monte Vergine (then known as Monte Vergiliana) between Nola and Benevento, where he lived as a hermit. Here he attracted a number of followers and founded the Monastery of Montevergine.

While at Montevergine, William of Vercelli is stated as having performed miracles. Roger II of Sicily served as a patron to William, who founded many monasteries for men and women in Sicily. The Catholic Encyclopedia states that Roger built a monastery opposite his palace at Salerno in order to have William always near him.

The inflow of the faithful was for the priests the opportunity to exercise their ministry, and the hermit life that William sought was compromised. Moreover, his confreres did not tolerate that lifestyle too austere and full of privations. Therefore, he left Montevergine in 1128 and settled on the plains in Goleto, in the territory of Sant'Angelo dei Lombardi, between Campania and Basilicata, where he founded the Abbey of San Guglielmo al Goleto.

Subsequently, he founded several other monasteries of the same rule but mostly remained in Goleto except for some trips to Apulia. Eventually, he died in Goleto on June 25, 1142. His remains were buried in Goleto, where they stayed until they were transferred to Montevergine on September 2, 1807, as ordered by the king of Naples Gioacchino Murat. Some of his relics are also located in other cathedrals (Benevento) and Italian churches. Catholic tradition states that William foresaw his own imminent death "by special revelation".

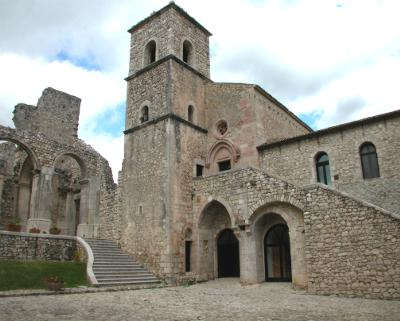
The Abbey of San Guglielmo al Goleto.

== Sources ==
The most reliable source concerning William of Vercelli's life is the Legenda de vita et obitu sancti Guilielmi Confessoris et heremitae, written in the first half of the 13th century, thus shortly thereafter. The remaining later sources contain corrupt or even invented accounts on his life, therefore they are unreliable although not necessarily false, as primary sources may have been lost.

== The miracle of the wolf ==
According to all the sources, including the earliest source, Legenda de vita et obitu sancti Guilielmi Confessoris et heremitae, all of which are close to Catholicism, he performed many miracles. The best-known miracle was and still is the "Miracle of the Wolf" (1591). Because of this, he is often depicted in company with a "domesticated" wolf, even in the monastery of Montevergine. One day a wolf hunted and killed a donkey the saint used for towing and other tasks. The saint then turned to the wolf and ordered the beast to offer himself to do all the donkey's previous tasks. The wild beast reportedly became tame, and the people who met the saint were astonished to see such a docile wolf.

== At King Roger II's court ==
Hagiographer Tommaso Costo (1591) wrote that king Roger II of Sicily had heard about William of Montevergine, and thus he wanted to meet him. The king reportedly was living in Salerno at that time. Reportedly, while visiting the king, a prostitute wanted to prove the genuineness of his faith, and, complicit with the king, tried to get into William of Montevergine's bed who, in response, put burning embers on his bed and there he lay down, inviting the prostitute to follow his example. Reportedly the woman repented of her mistake and switched to a more religious life.

Posthumous sources add further details, stating that the prostitute had been called Agnes and that, after conversion, she had built a monastery in Venosa, where she led a monastic life with other women, being called "Blessed Agnes of Venosa". Hagiographer Tommaso Costo, as early as in the 16th century, dismissed the second part of the story, there being no mention of it in the main and most reliable source, the Legenda de vita et obitu sancti Guilielmi Confessoris et heremitae.

== See also ==
- Abbey of San Guglielmo al Goleto

== Bibliography ==
- Giovanni Giacomo Giordano (1548). Croniche di Montevergine. Naples: Camilla Cavallo.
- Vita et obitus Sanctissimi Confessoris Guilielmi Vercellensis. Naples: Donato Celeto. 1581. (first printed edition of the Legenda de vita et obitus)
- Costo, Tommaso (1591). Istoria dell'origine del sagratissimo luogo di Montevergine (in Italian). Appresso Barezzo Barezzi.
- Berloco, Tommaso (1985). Storie inedite della città di Altamura (in Italian). ATA - Associazione Turistica Altamurana Pro Loco.
- The Book of Saints, compiled by the Benedictine monks of St Augustine's Abbey, Ramsgate. London: Cassell, 1994. ISBN 0-304-34357-9.
- Guglielmo di Montevergine (da Vercelli) at the Santi e Beati website.
