= Summonte =

- Comune
- Comune di Summonte
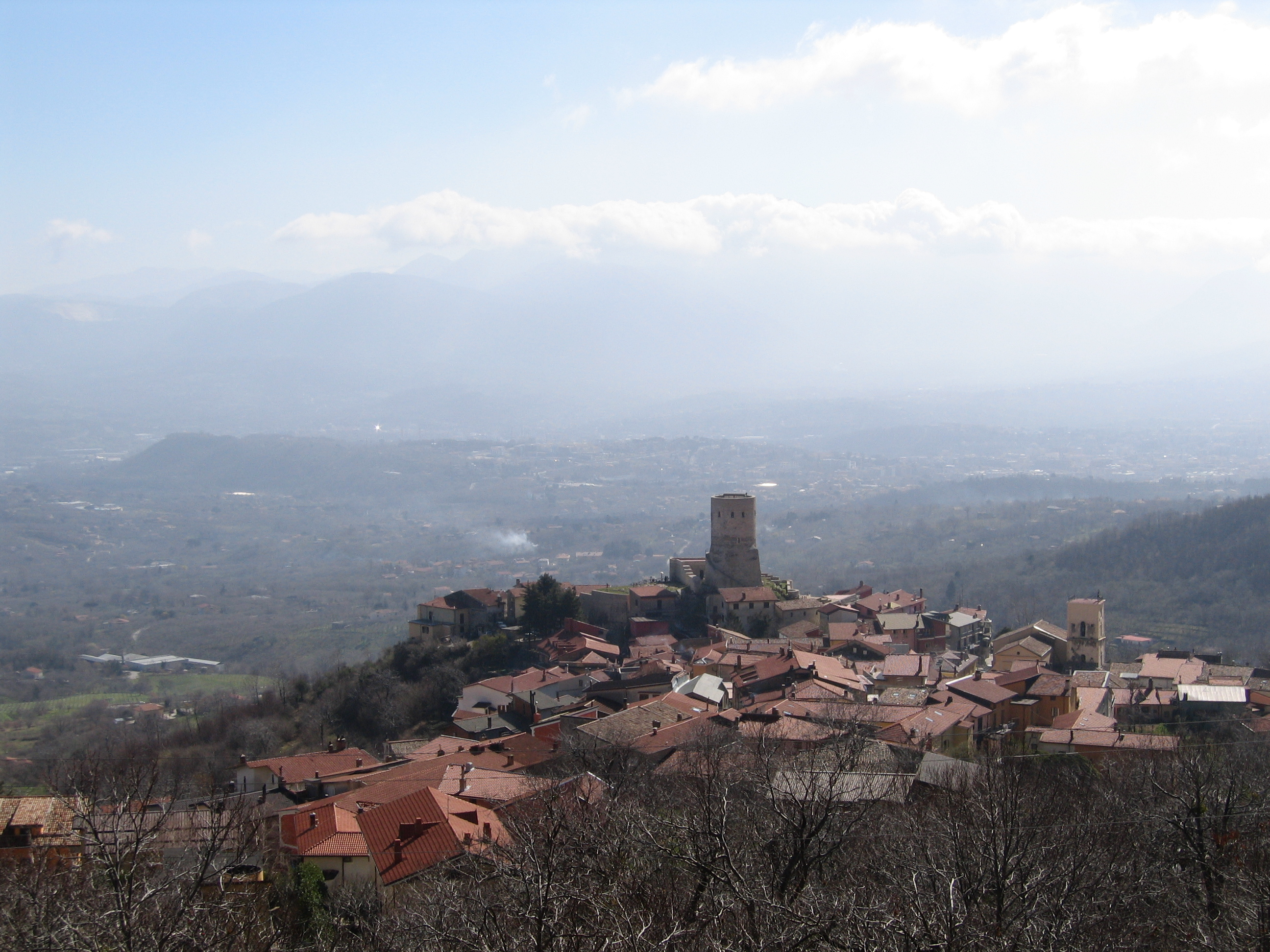

- Location within Italy Location within Campania
- Coordinates: 40°57′N 14°45′E
- Country: Italy
- Region: Campania
- Province: Avellino (AV)
- Frazioni: Embreciera, Starze

Area
  - Total: 12 km^{2} (4.6 sq mi)
- Elevation: 730 m (2,400 ft)

Population (1 May 2009)
  - Total: 1,636
  - Density: 140/km^{2} (350/sq mi)
- Demonym: Summontesi
- Time zone: UTC+1 (CET)
  - Summer (DST): UTC+2 (CEST)
- Postal code: 83010
- Dialing code: 0825
- Patron saint: San Nicola di Bari

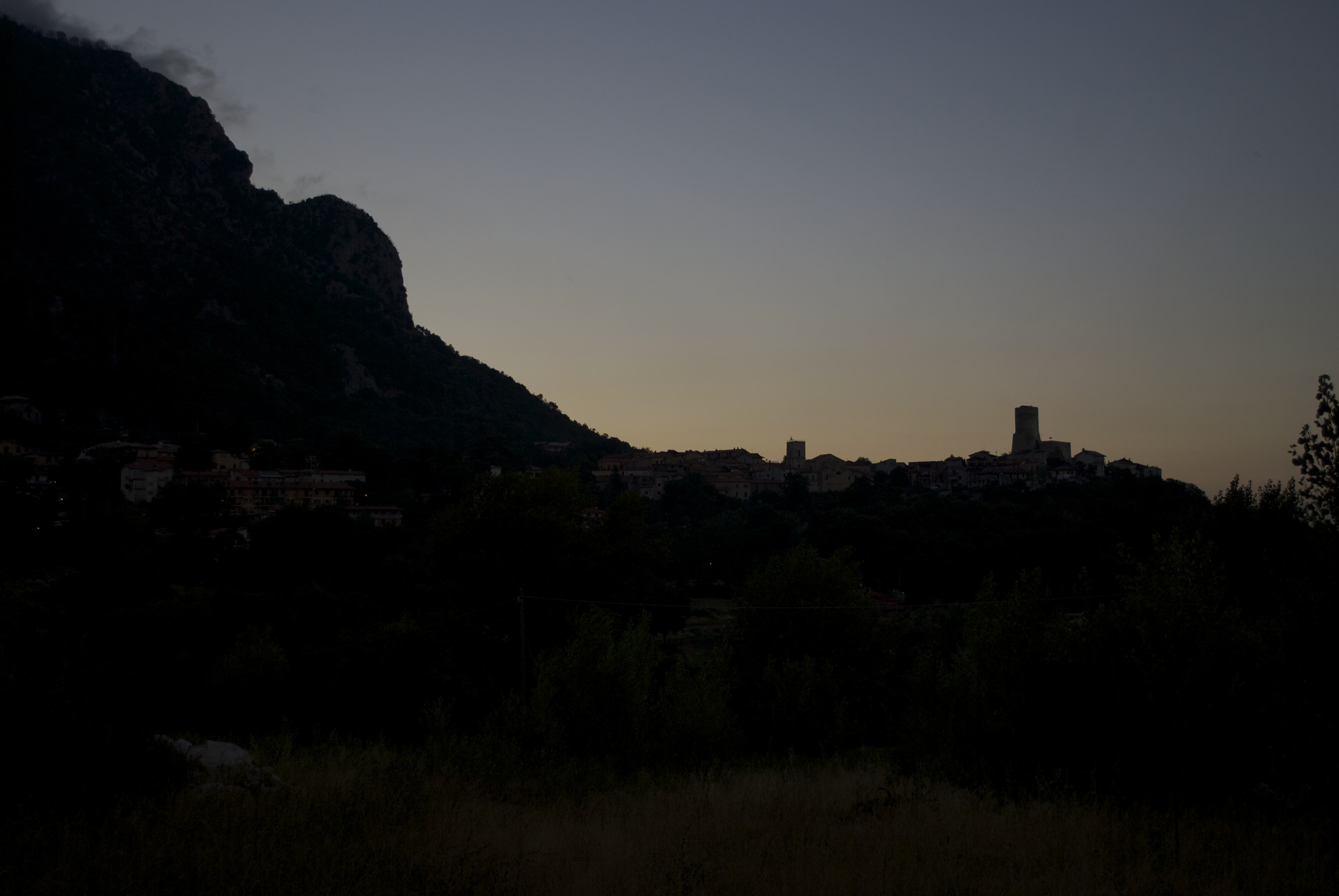

Summonte is a town and comune in the province of Avellino, Campania, Italy. It is one of I Borghi più belli d'Italia ("The most beautiful villages of Italy").

== History ==
Summonte was founded between the tenth and eleventh centuries, centered around the old fortifications of the location. The name came from its location at the foot of Mount Partenio. During the twelfth century, with the Norman conquest, it was a fiefdom under the Malerba family. In the first half of the fourteenth century, the last Malerba family member died without an heir, and it was passed on to the Leonessa family.

The Italian artist Raffaele Della Pia was born in Summonte.
