= Montevergine =

Mountain in Italy

Coordinates: 40°56′22″N 14°43′28″E

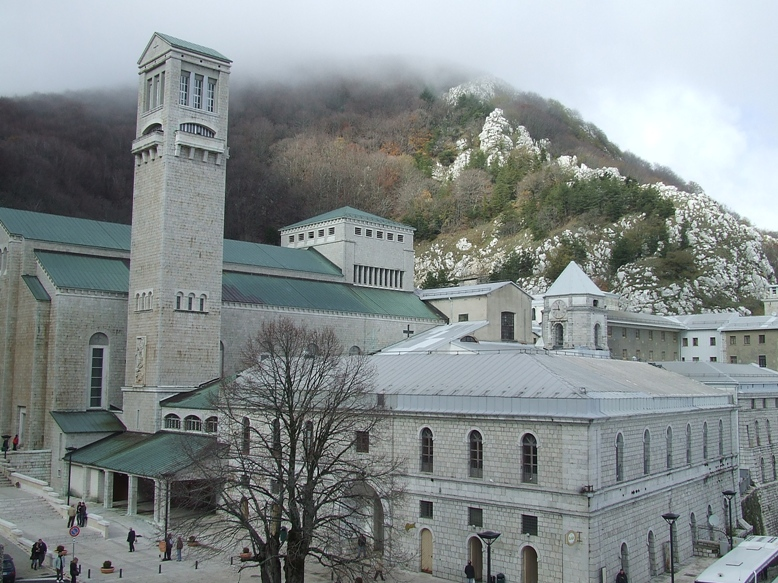
The Sanctuary of Montevergine.

The Montevergine, also known as Partenio or Monti di Avella, is a limestone massif in Campania, central Italy, part of the Apennine chain. It is located near Avellino, in the comune of Mercogliano. It has slopes covered by chestnut and beech trees, up to some 1,480 m above sea level.

== Overview ==
Under the peak, at some 1,270 m, is the Sanctuary of Montevergine, which attracts numerous pilgrims. It was consecrated in 1124 near the ruins of a temple of Cybele. The new basilica, built in 1961 by Florestano Di Fausto, is home to a 13th-century Byzantine icon of a black Madonna. The abbey palace was designed by Domenico Antonio Vaccaro, and has an octagonal plan. The Sanctuary is the cathedral of the Territorial Abbey of Montevergine.

The sanctuary can be reached from the town of Mercogliano by the Montevergine funicular.
