= Geography of Campania =

Flat land Hills Mountains

The geography of Campania illustrates the geographical characteristics of Campania, a region of Italy.

== General data ==
From the gulfs of Gaeta, Naples, Policastro and Salerno to the most notable elevations of the Campania Apennines, Campania extends over a morphologically very varied territory. To the north it borders Lazio and Molise; to the east, Apulia and Basilicata, which it also borders to the south; to the west the Tyrrhenian Sea.

== Areas ==
From a physical point of view, the Campania region can be divided into two areas: one mountainous and one flat:

1. The mountainous area includes the Campania Apennines, formed by a series of elevations, acrocores and plateaus (of Sannio, of Irpinia and of Cilento), between which open numerous and easy passes (the most important is the Sella di Ariano) and there flows the river Calore Irpino (left tributary of the Volturno) with its tributaries: Ufita ( in the center of the homonymous valley), Tammaro and Sabato.
2. The flat area is not a single surface, but is divided into many plains divided by many reliefs of the antiappennine; that is from the volcanic relief of Roccamonfina, of the Campi Flegrei, from Vesuvius and from the chain of Monti Lattari (which constitutes the Sorrento peninsula).

Therefore the flat area is divided into the plains: of Sessa Aurunca, bathed by the river Garigliano; of Capua the widest, crossed by the river Volturno; of Naples, which surrounds Vesuvius, one of the main Italian volcanoes; the countryside nocerino - sarnese close to the Lattari Mountains; of Paestum which opens onto the Gulf of Salerno and is bathed by the rivers Sele, Calore Lucano and Tanagro; of Alento which occupies a narrow portion between Monte Stella and Monte Gelbison.

== Coasts and rivers ==
The coasts of Campania are high and jagged and low and sandy in the plains. The main rivers are: the Volturno, which bathes Capua and flows into the Gulf of Gaeta; the Sele, which flows into the Gulf of Salerno; the Garigliano, which flows along the border with Lazio and flows into the Gulf of Gaeta; and the Ofanto, which originates in Irpinia and flows into the Adriatic Sea.

== Mountains ==
- Monte Iulio
- Monte Litto
- Monte Nero (Picentini)
- Pizzo San Michele
- Vesole
