= Monte Acellica =

Mountain in Italy

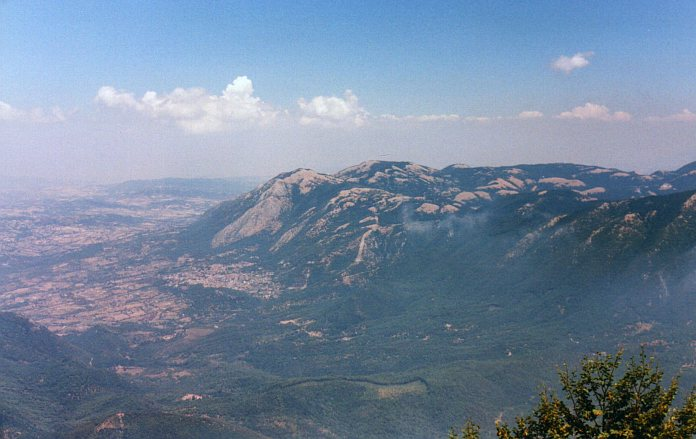

Highest point
- Elevation: 1,660 m (5,450 ft)
- Coordinates: 40°46′39″N 15°00′21″E

Geography
- Location within Italy
- Location: Campania, Italy
- Parent range: Apennines

Monte Accellica is a mountain in the Monti Picentini range, located in Campania, Italy. The mountain is 1660 metres (5446 feet) tall and is situated on the border between the provinces of Salerno and Avellino, divided between the comuni of Acerno, Giffoni Valle Piana, and Montella. Several rivers typical of the region have their sources on the slopes of Monte Accellica, including the Picentino, the Tusciano, and the Calore Irpino, which is itself the largest tributary of the Volturno. In the local dialects, the mountain is called Céleca (IPA: [ˈtʃeləka]) or Acéleca (IPA: [aˈtʃeləka]).

Monte Accellica is located within the Terminio Cervialto Mountain Community, as well as Monti Picentini Regional Park. Part of the southern face of the mountain is included in the Oasi Monte Accellica natural reserve, managed by WWF Italia.
