= Revolt of Montefalcione =

1861 rebellion in Montefalcione, Italy

The revolt of Montefalcione was a popular pro-Bourbon insurrection that occurred between July 6 and 10, 1861, which had Montefalcione as its epicenter, as well as spreading to several neighboring towns and villages. The anti-unification unrest that shook the territory of Irpinia in those days was characterized by bloody fighting and acts of hostility, perpetrated by both factions involved.

These acts culminated in a massacre, carried out in the town of Montemiletto and its surroundings by contingents of the Hungarian Legion and the Royal Italian Army, through the summary killing, for the purpose of repression and reprisal, of a number of rioters and civilians varying, according to sources, between 97 and 150. Among them, Giuseppe D'Amore, a boy who was only thirteen years old, was also shot.

== Background ==
=== First revolt of Montemiletto ===
In September 1860, about a month before the holding of the annexation plebiscites, while the territory of the Campanian provinces was affected by the events related to Garibaldi's campaign in the south of Italy's mainland and the imminent entry of regular troops of the Piedmontese army, most of the populations of Montemiletto, Torre Le Nocelle and Pietradefusi rose up in arms against the pro-Unitarian forces to restore the authority of Francis II, railing against the liberal families in the area.

In Montemiletto, the action of liberal groups led to the overthrow of Bourbon institutions: on the night of September 5, some pro-Unitarian veterans of the Ariano insurrection, including Carmine Tarantino, a captain of the National Guard and professor at the Royal High School, entered the town. Receiving the support of Giuseppe Fierimonte, leader of the liberals and captain of the local National Guard, Tarantino and his men, extolling Garibaldi, headed for the local telegraph post, cutting its wires and isolating it. The group then placed under arrest the Urban Guard militiamen who had resisted the taking of the town.

The action of the pro-Unitarian forces led to turmoil and agitation among the legitimist population: at dawn on September 6, the sound of the tofa, a sea shell used as a horn of call, summoned the peasants of the countryside surrounding Montemiletto to prepare to fight back. In the evening, ringing bells accompanied the village uprising, which was led by Matteo Lanzilli of Montemiletto and Carmine Ardolino of Torre Le Nocelle.

Armed with rifles and rural tools, the commoners penetrated Giuseppe Fieramonte's palace, killing him with axes and shotguns. Other liberals perished: Domenico Colletti and his son, Angelo Leone, brother of the archpriest, Raffaele La Porta, Pellegrino Meola and his son, some members of the Pesa family, and other liberals from Aiello and Montaperto returning from the Ariano expedition. Giacinto de' Sivo reports that the bodies of the liberals were laid out on the telegraph pylons that they had torn down the previous day. According to some sources, a total of 23 liberals were killed and the homes of many landowners were looted.

The following day the legitimists moved toward Torre Le Nocelle and "to the sound of drums and with white flags, shouting Long Live Francis II." They went through the streets of the town, hunting down the liberals: three of them, Pasquale Rotondi, Carmine Rotondi and Baldassare Rotondi, were killed. On the morning of the 7th, Bourbon soldiers on horseback set out from Avellino for Montemiletto, but were recalled by General Scotti and driven back. At the same time, Garibaldian troops entered the town of Irpinia, putting it back under the Unitarian forces, repressing and arresting the rioters, with the intention of "exacting revenge" on the population, in the words of historian de' Sivo. On the same day, Garibaldi entered Naples.

The uprising resulted in more than five hundred indicted, and nearly four hundred arrests. In Dentecane, a jury was set up, with the task of judging those arrested and executing among them the "instigators of public order by seditious actions." The special court was dissolved on October 27, 1860 by an act of Minister of Grace and Justice Pasquale Scura, countersigned by prodictator Giorgio Pallavicino, and the jurisdiction was transferred to the ordinary courts.

In mid-September Garibaldi sent J. R. Wolfe, in his capacity as "Surgeon of the General Staff" to the area to treat the wounded of Ariano and Montemiletto, who had a grim impression of the living conditions of many families, and on September 18 he opened a subscription to which he called on Neapolitans to contribute "so that you may wish with offerings to help those unhappy fellow citizens of yours who have paid such a high price for your present joy."

To escape capture, many rioters had gone into hiding, taking refuge in the woods between Montefalcione, Montemiletto, Lapio, Chiusano and Montaperto, as well as in the mountains of Volturara, Sorbo and Salza.

=== The formation of rebel groups ===
These first groups of insurgents, later enlarged by other fugitives, began to organize militarily also due to the presence among them of former soldiers of the Army of the Two Sicilies. The armed bands that were being formed had the more or less explicit support of the legitimist populations, receiving logistical and organizational support from numerous inhabitants of the municipalities in the area, acting as liaisons between the insurgent groups and the various towns.

Two figures in particular soon rose to prominence among the insurgents, that of 25-year-old Basilio Pagliuca, who was the mastermind and military leader of the revolt, and that of 42-year-old Gaetano Maria Baldassarre. Both from prominent Montefalcione families (their respective fathers had served as mayors at different times), they were the leading figures of the resistance movement. Baldassarre, who had played a prominent role in the Montemiletto uprising of September 1860, had already been denounced on the following October 30 by Montefalcione Mayor Carlo Contrada, who had explicitly requested the authorities in Naples that the captain of the National Guard of Candida, Michele Tagle, be put on his trail.

Gaetano Baldassarre was the soul of the turmoil. He and his sister Nicolina were energetic activists: they held organizational meetings, encouraged the resistance, and worked to spread insurrectional ideas by putting up political posters hostile to the Savoy government and Garibaldi as well as extolling the revolt. Also collaborating with Baldassarre was archpriest Gaetano Girone, who was similarly denounced to the authorities in Naples.

The arrest warrant against Baldassarre was issued by Naples on November 1, 1860, and its execution was referred to the governor of Avellino, Giuseppe Belli, who had called Baldassarre "the fiercest leader of the rebellion that took place in Montefalcione and the massacres of Montemiletto." Baldassarre left the area in order to escape capture, and took refuge first in Capua, and then in Gaeta, where he was one of the extreme defenders of the Kingdom of the Two Sicilies as part of the siege of the fortress. After the capitulation of Gaeta, and in accordance with the surrender pacts, he returned to Montefalcione, where he disguised under an apparent tranquility his intention to continue in the work of rebellion, becoming the political coordinator of the revolt.

In addition to Pagliuca and Baldassarre, other men from the surrounding area rose to the role of leaders of the movement, including Angelo Ciarla of Montemiletto, Vincenzo Petruzziello of Montefalcione, Pasquale Palladino of Lapio and Francesco de Francesco of Chiusano.

== Montefalcione riots ==
=== The insurrection ===
As early as the first days of January 1861, the governor of Avellino was alerted about the preparations of the revolt, which was underway in the area between Montefalcione, Lapio, Montemiletto, Torre le Nocelle and Pietradefusi. Upon such news, a reconnaissance unit commanded by Captain Masi was sent to the area, with orders to conduct searches and disarm suspects. Despite this, a number of Bourbon flags were hoisted in Montefalcione on February 10, and the subsequent arrival of Captain Tagle in an investigative capacity had no major results. The situation in the area became progressively uncontrollable, and not even the National Guard was in a position to exert any opposition to the rising sentiment of rebellion.

On the evening of July 5, the military leaders of the uprising, led by the young Pagliuca, worked out the final details of the action to be taken, and exchanged their watchword, which was to be "Rome and seven clubs." The next morning, two armed men came to the mayor of Montefalcione, Diocle Polcari, intimating that he should destroy the Savoy insignia and incite the people to revolt. After pretending to comply, the mayor fled to Candida to his brother Basilio at the first opportunity.

In the afternoon of the same day, about sixty men, including many uniformed Bourbon soldiers, entered the town commanded by Basilio Pagliuca and Carmine la Contrada. Upon the department's arrival, the population rose up, disarming the National Guard, destroying the Savoyard insignia and raising the Bourbon flag in their place; meanwhile, the few liberals in the village fled. The Savoy government was declared forfeited, the Bourbon government restored, and Gaetano Baldassarre was appointed mayor, effectively restoring Montefalcione as a territory of the Kingdom of the Two Sicilies. The municipality thus became the center of a revolt that would soon spread to neighboring towns and villages, while Pagliuca was assumed to be the point of reference for conspirators from neighboring villages.

=== The government counteroffensive ===
Even before the hotbed of revolt was ignited in Montefalcione, government forces in nearby Montemiletto feared an uprising in the town, so much so that they lobbied the new governor of Avellino, Nicola De Luca, several times, tending to obtain the dispatch of military units. The governor arranged several arrest warrants issued for anyone suspected of plotting against the new government, but he could not send soldiers, since the bulk of those he had, about eighty men from the 62nd Infantry Regiment, were employed in guarding the overcrowded prisons in the province filled with reactionaries.

Montemiletto, however, was considered a square of relevant strategic importance, since it was seen as the last outpost in defense of the Montefusco prison, in which about 300 prisoners were held, part of whom were precisely Montemiletto people arrested after the September 1860 uprising and for whom a liberation attempt was feared. Thus, on July 5, De Luca authorized Carmine Tarantino, accompanied by a few soldiers, to gather men to take on Montemiletto. Stopping at Candida, Tarantino hoped to complete his troop by also hiring Tagle, who had 72 National Guard militiamen at his disposal, but a reasonable economic arrangement could not be found. Before reaching Montemiletto, the expedition crossed paths with some liberal families fleeing the town, but Tarantino convinced them to turn back. On the 6th, the Savoyards entered Montemiletto, establishing in the Fierimonti (or Fierimonte) palace, which had the appearance of a fort, their headquarters.

An initial reaction to the legitimist insurrection in Montefalcione was thus organized. On July 7, starting from Montemiletto, Carmine Tarantino, together with Archpriest Leone, a former prisoner, later pardoned, and now mayor of the same town, at the head of five line infantry soldiers, a few National Guardsmen and about 40 volunteers (among them, according to De Sivo there were also Camorrists), attempted the assault on Montefalcione; however, finding themselves outnumbered, they were forced to retreat, taking shelter in Contrada Bosco. Hailing from Montefredane, Montefusco, Santa Paolina, Pratola and Prata, about one hundred and twenty men, including infantrymen and national guardsmen, came to Tarantino's rescue. A firefight with the rebels ensued: nine of them were taken prisoner, while one fell in combat. The government troops, about to gain the upper hand, pursued the reactionaries all the way into the town of Montefalcione, but were led, thus, into an ambush: they were repelled and forced to flee. Tarantino, abandoned by his reinforcements, returned with his group to Montemiletto, locking himself up in the Fierimonte palace along with the liberal families.

=== After the revolt ===
To Montefalcione, now in legitimist hands, came from Montemiletto a squad of men, some of them wearing the uniform of the Army of the Two Sicilies, led by Angelo Ciarla. Friar Urbano Noviello led a procession through the streets of the town, during which a picture of Queen Maria Cristina, wife of Ferdinand II and venerated as a saint, was raised.

In the meantime, on the morning of July 7, Basilio Pagliuca had moved toward Chiusano di San Domenico, with the aim of fostering the uprising of this town and to help the insurgents of Lapio; while, the next day, Angelo Ciarla left Montefalcione with his men to return to Montemiletto.

Despite the moments of great popular excitement, in Montefalcione, during the few days of the Baldassarre administration, public order was ensured and no criminal incidents were recorded. The only notable exception was the seizure of weapons from the home of Ercole Polcari.

News of the success of the Montefalcione movement soon spread to neighboring towns: dozens of municipalities and villages rose up, destroying the Savoy insignia and restoring Bourbon institutions with the appointment of a mayor and the reestablishment of the Urban Guard. There were reportedly thirty-one insurgent towns, although official documents indicate that, excluding villages, there were fewer than twenty insurgent municipalities.

== The massacre of Montemiletto ==
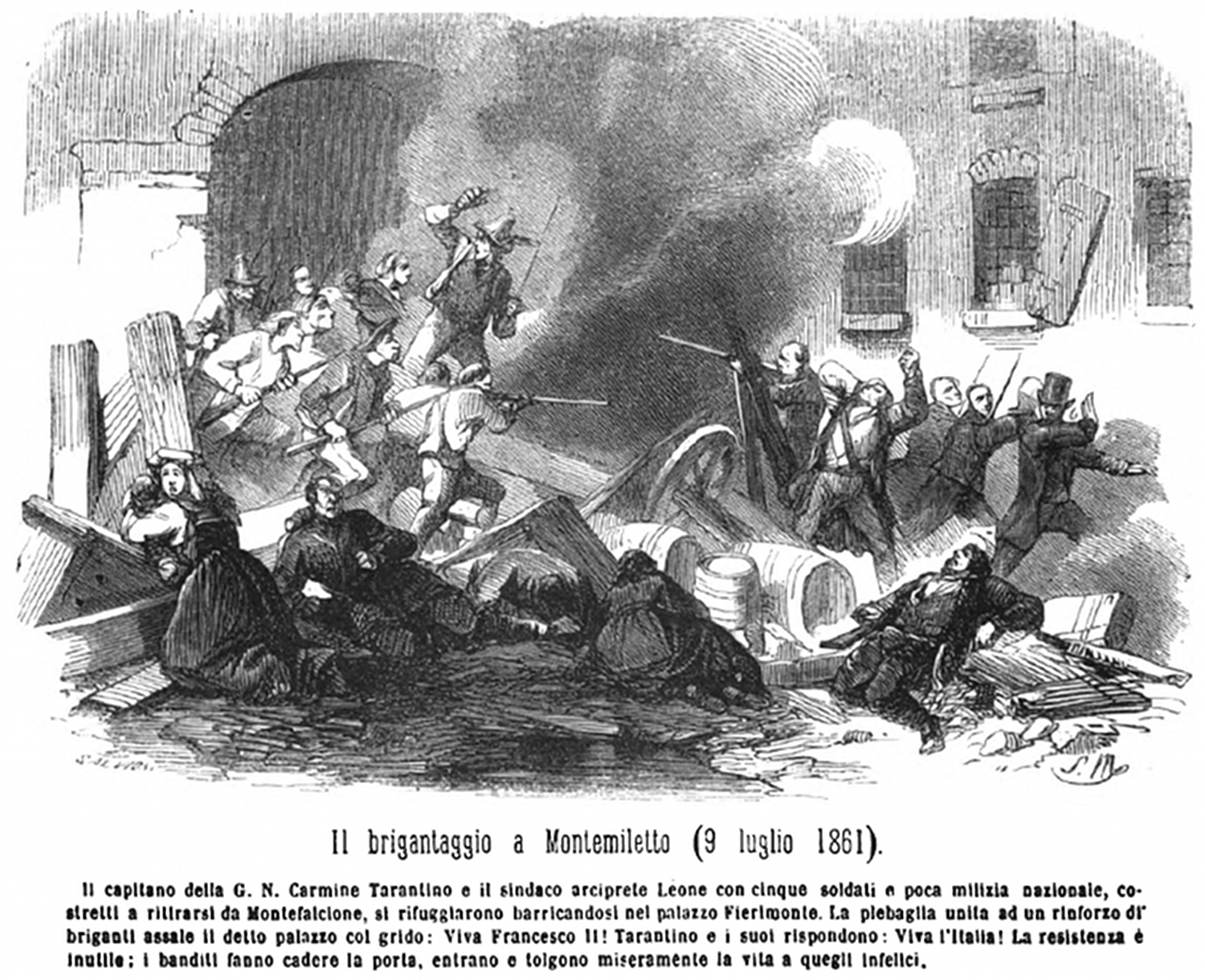
Period print depicting rioters breaking into the courtyard of Fierimonte Palace.

On the morning of July 8, the legitimist revolt spread to the town of Montemiletto, but the clash reached its climax the following night. The episode is described by both historian Giacinto de' Sivo and Swiss writer Marc Monnier, who refers to an "unpublished" report drawn up by the vice-governor of the province of Avellino and sent to the Secretariat of the Interior and Police in Naples. According to Monnier, about 60 rioters, whose ranks were soon swelled by local peasants to 400, besieged the Fierimonte palace, where the Montemiletto liberals had barricaded themselves with their families.

The rebels attacked the Fierimonte palace to the cry of "Long live Francis II," to which the liberals replied "Long live Italy." A long gunfight ensued and the pro-Bourbonists set fire to the building using bundles brought by women as fuel. The main gate and a barricade erected by the liberals were consequently half-burned, and were finally destroyed with axes. The besiegers were then able to enter the palace en masse and quickly get the better of the besieged. Tarantino was personally killed by Vincenzo Petruzziello; Leone, two of the latter's brothers and some members of the Fusco and Colletto families equally died. Both de' Sivo and Monnier report the presence of women and children among the defenders of Fierimonte Palace, but they mention them differently. The former counts them exclusively among the legitimists, the latter reports that women and children from liberal families were "slaughtered" during the assault on the building. According to Monnier, one soldier was shot and two men shouting "Long live Italy" were dragged to the cemetery and thrown alive into a pit among the corpses. Three other soldiers were finally taken to Montefalcione and were ordered to fire on their fellow soldiers who were attacking the town. Of the three, two refused and were killed, while the last, pretending to accept, managed to escape, rejoining the liberal forces. Instead, de' Sivo reports that a Piedmontese officer and five of his men were taken to the cemetery and shot there.

In counting liberal casualties, Monnier states that "seventeen men perished cruelly in the Fierimonte palace," while de' Sivo reports that few of Tarantino's forty men were saved. The number of dead among the insurgents, however, is not known.

== Massacre of Montefalcione ==
Montefalcione Massacre
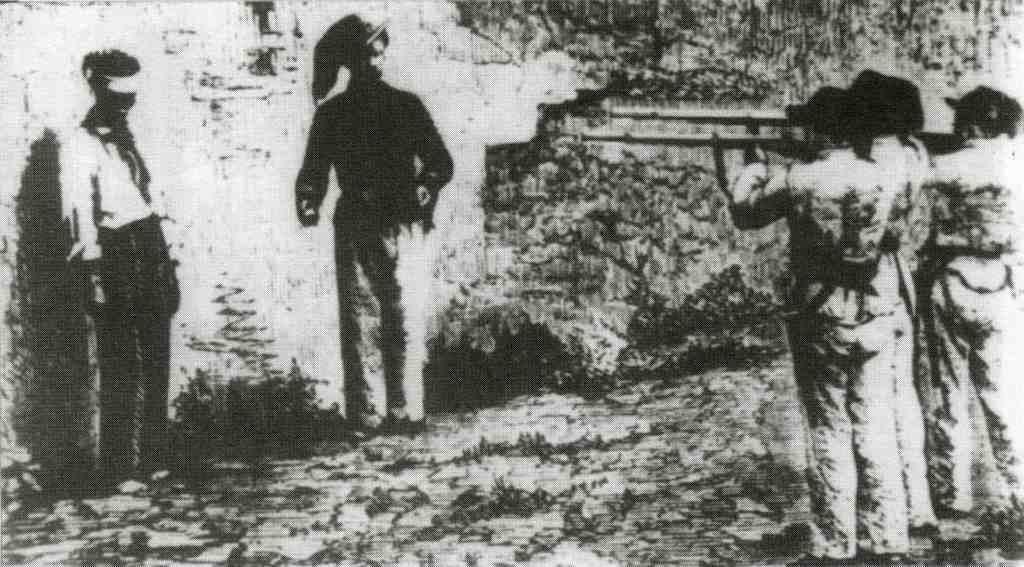
- The shooting of Vincenzo Petruzziello, Montefalcione, July 1861.
- Location: Montefalcione, Province of Avellino, Italy
- Date: July 9, 1861; 7 a.m. – 11 p.m.
- Target: Civilians and former soldiers of the Army of the Two Sicilies
- Attack type: Summary shootings, including the execution of a child
- Injuries: Unspecified
- Victims: 97 to 150 dead, several dozen arrested
- Assailant: Hungarian Legion of the Royal Italian Army
- Motive: Repression of a pro-Bourbon popular uprising and retaliation for pro-unitary people killed during it

=== The clash ===
Although the disbanding of the various detachments of the National Guard had the consequence of relieving the military capacity that the Avellino Junta could exercise over the surrounding territory, Governor De Luca made an attempt to recapture Montefalcione. On the morning of July 9, commanding a column of National Guards, soldiers and some Montefalcione liberals, a total number varying, depending on the sources, from one hundred to over four hundred, he marched to the insurgent town held by some 2,000 insurgents to recapture it and re-establish government authority.

Before the expedition reached the vicinity of the village, moving along hilly paths, a man in shabby clothes, claiming to be Pagliuca's ambassador, came to meet the troop and asked to speak with the governor. The ambassador reported that if the column entered in peace, the rebels would leave and no violence would be used against the government people. De Luca replied:

I will enter with peace as long as you lay down your arms and kiss my feet.

— Nicola De Luca, governor of the province of Avellino

The messenger retorted, "This will never happen." De Luca saved his life so that the latter could report to Pagliuca that, as a "brigand," he had no right to negotiate agreements. Having resumed their march, after a brief halt, the government men fell, a league and a half away from the town, into an initial ambush, which they soon managed to repel. Having entered, about a hundred paces into the built-up area, an apparently deserted Montefalcione, they were surprised by an unexpected attack from the commoners. Men, women and children, barricaded in the dwellings, from the windows, pelted the pro-Savoyards with stones and arquebuses; according to Tecce, many of the commoners were armed with rifled guns, but, untrained in their use, loaded them improperly with poor results in shooting. De Luca succeeded in killing a woman, who proved quick in reloading her weapon, by shooting her in the mouth, while his men set fire to a house on the roof of which rebels were stationed, but the latter still prevailed, forcing the liberals to flee to avoid being surrounded, after about two hours of fighting.

The government men thus took cover within the walls of the Christian Doctrine Fathers' monastery, forcing their way in, where they were surrounded by siege. At least six soldiers, including a Piedmontese sergeant, failed to enter the building before the barricades were hoisted. Remaining in the open, three of them, including the sergeant and a captain, fell victim to the rebels, while the other three, who were later let into the monastery, got the better of two rioters, killing them. During the night, the combat did not cease, but, then, the rioters' shots were directed against the tricolor flag, raised on the bell tower of the monastery, while the white flag of the Two Sicilies flew from the bell tower of the church of Montefalcione and on the highest peaks of the palaces. Once the firing ended, the government officials were, then, the object of ridicule and derision by the insurgents. The siege continued and around two o'clock, the insurgents unsuccessfully attempted to set fire to the monastery; at the same time one of the National Guardsmen attempted to escape, but was shot dead by Michele Pagliuca.

By morning, the government troops were exhausted and on the verge of capitulation. The pro-Savoyards, therefore, were preparing for a desperate sortie, aware that they were outnumbered and, therefore, largely destined to perish. At the same time, in the square in front of the monastery, the rebellious women had resumed piling up bundles. If the government troops had been defeated, the legitimists would have had the road to Avellino paved, which was completely unprotected and could have led to unexpected repercussions throughout the province. The requests for relief sent to Naples by De Luca, through the Avellino Junta, were answered by the order, given by Colonel Juhász of the Hungarian Legion, stationed in Nocera Inferiore, to send to the area 2 companies (three hundred men) and all available Hussars from the garrison of Nocera. Thus it was that, as early as the morning of July 9, two companies of the infantry battalion and one hundred and twenty Hussars arrived in Avellino under the command of Major Girczy.

=== The victory of the Royal Army and the massacre ===
The Hungarian companies of the Royal Italian Army were divided into two detachments, one of which, composed of the first company commanded by Captain Pinczés, moved toward Montefusco; the other, composed of the second company, commanded by Captain Biró, moved toward Montemiletto. The two detachments received additional hussars in reinforcement before the end of the day, along with orders to prepare to attack Montefalcione from the north the next morning at 7 a.m. to free De Luca from the siege at the convent. The plan was that at the same time Captain Girczy would carry out a pincer movement on the village, attacking in turn from the south.

Sanctuary of St. Anthony of Padua. Mother Church of Montefalcione.

The attack was carried at the agreed time, in the direction of the Montefalcione monastery, where the infantrymen of the Aosta brigade and the National Guards commanded by De Luca were barricaded. The arrival of the Hungarians, announced to the liberals by the observation of a change in activity in the village, where men and women fled carrying personal belongings, and by the ringing of bells sounding the alarm, enabled the besieged to counterattack by exiting the monastery. After a resistance of about an hour, most of the besiegers were forced to disperse. A group of about five hundred insurgents, on the other hand, determined to resist, fell back to the upper part of the town. Of these, about forty barricaded themselves in two farms, which were set on fire by the Hungarians. Forced out to escape the flames, they were all massacred.

Around 11 a.m., the attacking forces managed to regroup under the command of Major Girczy and head for the center of the village. Upon reaching the village, the Hungarians attacked the barricades raised as best the insurgents could and overpowered them, then pursued them through the streets of the village and the surrounding countryside, where "terrible slaughter was made of them." In fact, a bloody reprisal was initiated, with indiscriminate shootings that continued into the night[55]. The newspaper Il Nazionale of July 13, 1861 reported that the bodies of 30 people were found in the streets of the urban center, while other lifeless bodies were scattered throughout the countryside. Giacinto de' Sivo and Marc Monnier reported 30 people slaughtered in a church (or a house) and five other men shot. Other sources, including Pietro Calà Ulloa, at the time prime minister of the Bourbon government in exile in Rome, claim a church was the place of execution, writing that 50 "men who were refugees in the same house of God" were killed. Eight others, then, were shot in the monastery of the Christian Doctrine Fathers. According to de' Sivo, as the population fled, the militiamen of the Hungarian legion went through the houses looting them and setting fire to them; among others, Pagliuca's house was also looted. According to Tecce, who reports only the fire at the latter's palace, the household goods taken from it were, however, distributed to the poor.

The rioters fleeing to the mountains, scattered among the woods, were pursued by the men of the Hungarian Legion led by Major Rheinfeld (two companies and two sections with 4 pieces of mountain artillery), in a roundup that lasted until July 14.

With government authority restored, Lieutenant Santulli was able to replace the Bourbon flag placed on the bell tower with the tricolor flag. In the following days the Savoy forces were augmented by the arrival of two companies of riflemen commanded by Major Rheinfeld, equipped with four cannons. The Hungarians, with orders to shoot on sight, raked the countryside in the area at length in search of fugitives.

In Verzare, a hamlet of Montefalcione, and in other parts of the country, four people were shot, including Giuseppe D'Amore, a boy who was only thirteen years old. Forty-seven other insurgents were executed, falling victims to summary shootings. Vincenzo Petruzziello was also shot, but before his execution he confessed that the money that had financed the insurgents came from Benevento and Rome.

The massacre was echoed in newspapers in the area, which described the events. In L'Irpino of July 10, for example, it was written, "The massacre of the enemies is a horrendous thing to say and to see, not a single person's life has been spared." Meanwhile, La Bandiera Italiana of July 14 commented, "The massacre of the brigands has atoned for those painful losses of ours with immense carnage. No quarter has been given to anyone, and rightly so. It is time to rid the towns of these Iroquois."

=== Epilogue ===
The events of July 1861 involved an unspecified number of rioters, which different sources estimate at between 2000 and 6000 in revolt against the Kingdom of Italy. The number of victims is still unspecified: while nothing is known about the number of those burned alive, as for those killed in combat and those shot, the different sources report numbers varying from 97 to 100 to 135 up to 150 killed, the number of liberals killed by the legitimists is not counted.

Many of the military personnel participating in the Montefalcione massacre obtained honors from the Italian government for their behavior in the field. Major Girczy was decorated with the cross of knight of the Military Order of Savoy and the bronze medal of military valor, and an honor was also received by Major Rheinfeld; 4 officers and 16 troop soldiers were decorated with the silver medal of military valor, and 32 troop soldiers received honorable mention. Liberal Pasquale Mauriello, on the other hand, was awarded the post of mayor of Montefalcione. He became the protagonist of acts of bribery and abuse of office to the point of being dismissed. Taking advantage of the general climate of judicial persecution, he collected bribes from his fellow citizens, who in return obtained the cancellation of all charges.

== Repression of insurrectionary movements ==
Following the suppression of the Montefalcione insurrection, there was an extensive military campaign in the following days that targeted the various towns in the surrounding area. With a force of 200 hussars, a battalion of the 62nd Line Infantry, a company of Hungarians, a company of the 6th Line Infantry and 800 National Guardsmen, government troops moved among the insurgent towns to pacify their populations.

Let the good be comforted: woe to the rascals, the hour of their destruction has sounded. Anyone caught with weapons in hand is shot immediately.

— Nicola De Luca, governor of the province of Avellino

In Montemiletto, the arrival of the Hungarians caused a real exodus: Monnier reports the flight of about 4,000 people from the town to the fields and mountains. The Savoy retaliation was even harsher on the inhabitants of this town, as seventeen people had been killed there, including royal soldiers, camorrists and liberal civilians. On July 14, after Count Gustavo Ponza di San Martino, the king's lieutenant, offered his resignation due to his inability to normalize the territory, he was replaced by General Enrico Cialdini. Thus a rumor spread, probably without foundation, that Cialdini had planned to bomb Montemiletto just as he had bombed Gaeta, only to desist. Despite the fierce repression suffered by the town, L'Irpino of August 10 reported that Montemiletto was preparing to rise up once again against the Unitarian government. In Lapio, several summary executions were carried out; among those executed were the trumpeter and drummer of the town's musical band, as they were guilty of playing the national anthem of the Two Sicilies during the days of the revolt. In Castelfranci, on the other hand, Nicola Roberto was arrested for making speeches adverse to the government; he managed, however, to escape, but was again captured and shot. In Prata, a blacksmith, Alfonso Luongo, was accused of extolling Francis II and insulting Garibaldi and the government: for this he was indicted for conspiracy. In Volturara, a ringleader was hanged and left exposed for several days; while De Luca thus qualified the town and its inhabitants:

Volturara, a barbaric and uncivilized town, albeit a large one of 7,000 inhabitants. I arranged all the troops and cannons for the town, so that those idiots would be persuaded of the government's strength.

— Nicola De Luca, governor of the province of Avellino

Government action was also characterized by the indiscriminate rounding up of commoners, who were arrested and herded into prisons in Montemiletto, Sant'Angelo dei Lombardi, Montella, Avellino and Montefusco. Due to overcrowding and inhumane conditions of detention, a very high number of deaths were recorded in the latter two prisons, due to the spread of infectious diseases among the prisoners.

== Aftermath ==
The two protagonists of the Montefalcione events had different fates. Basilio Pagliuca, who survived the massacre, went into hiding for some time. Hunted down, he was persuaded to turn himself in and underwent a long trial, at the end of which he was sentenced to twenty-five years of hard labor, followed by another ten years of special surveillance, plus a fine of one hundred liras. It is certain, however, that he did not serve his entire sentence, as he married Consolata Anzalone on August 6, 1881. He died while still young on March 19, 1894, leaving his wife and seven children.

Gaetano Maria Baldassarre also remained a fugitive for a time. On more than one occasion Michele Tagle, head of the National Guards, went to Montefalcione to search his home. Tagle went so far as to demand from him, through his brother-in-law, a bribe of 50 piastres, with which he could buy his freedom, but Baldassarre did not accept the blackmail. On the night of January 6-7, 1863, a letter from him addressed precisely to his brother-in-law was intercepted and his hiding place revealed: he was arrested and referred to the war court on charges of brigandage, but his fate is unknown.

Subsequent trials led to the conviction of at least seventeen participants in the insurrectional uprisings, most to heavy sentences of hard labor, special surveillance and fines. The events of Montefalcione were mentioned in a parliamentary motion made on November 20, 1861 by Casoria deputy Francesco Proto, Duke of Maddaloni, as an example of the atrocities committed by the Savoy army in the territories of the former Kingdom of the Two Sicilies.

== See also ==
- Post-Unification Italian Brigandage
- Montefalcione
- Unification of Italy

== Bibliography ==
- Calà Ulloa, Pietro (1864). Lettere napolitane. Roma: Tipografia di Angelo Placidi. [ISBN unspecified]
- de' Sivo, Giacinto (1868). Storia delle Due Sicilie 1847-1861. Vol. 2. Trieste. [ISBN unspecified]
- Di Fiore, Gigi (2007). Controstoria dell'unità d'Italia: fatti e misfatti del Risorgimento. Milano: Rizzoli.
- Spagnuolo, Edoardo (1997). La rivolta di Montefalcione. Storia di un'insurrezione popolare durante l'occupazione piemontese. Napoli: Edizioni Nazione Napoletana. [ISBN unspecified]
- Aprile, Pino (2010). Terroni: tutto quello che è stato fatto perché gli italiani del Sud diventassero "meridionali". Milano: Edizioni Piemme.
- Monnier, Marc (1862). Notizie storiche documentate sul brigantaggio: nelle provincie napoletane. Firenze: G. Barbèra. [ISBN unspecified]
- Martucci, Roberto (1999). L'invenzione dell'Italia unita: 1855-1864. Firenze: Sansoni.
- Molfese, Franco (1972). Storia del brigantaggio dopo l'Unità. Milano: Feltrinelli. [ISBN unspecified]
- Tecce, Salvatore Benigno (1933) [1861]. "Ragguaglio sugli ultimi moti reazionari di Montefalcione e di altri paeselli vicini" (PDF). Rivista Irpinia - Anno V - Marzo-Giugno. Avellino: Tipografia Pergola. [ISBN unspecified]
- P., A. (1863). Il martire irpino - con cenno storico delle reazioni di Montemiletto, Montefalcione, ecc. ecc. avvenute in Principato Ulteriore nel 1860 e 1861. Napoli: Stamperia di Raffaele Prete. [ISBN unspecified]
- Francesco Barra, Federico Biondi, Fiorenzo Iannino, Paolo Speranza. (a cura di Annibale Cogliano), 1860 L'Irpinia nella crisi dell'unificazione, Quaderni Irpini. 1989
- Musto, Arcangelo (1985). Montis Militum et Montis Aperti Historia - Storia del Comune di Montemiletto dalle origini ad oggi. Lioni: Tipolitografia Irpina. [ISBN unspecified]
- Carteny, Andrea (2013). La legione ungherese contro il brigantaggio, Volume 1. Roma: Edizioni Nuova Cultura.
