= Giffoni Sei Casali =

- Comune
- Comune di Giffoni Sei Casali
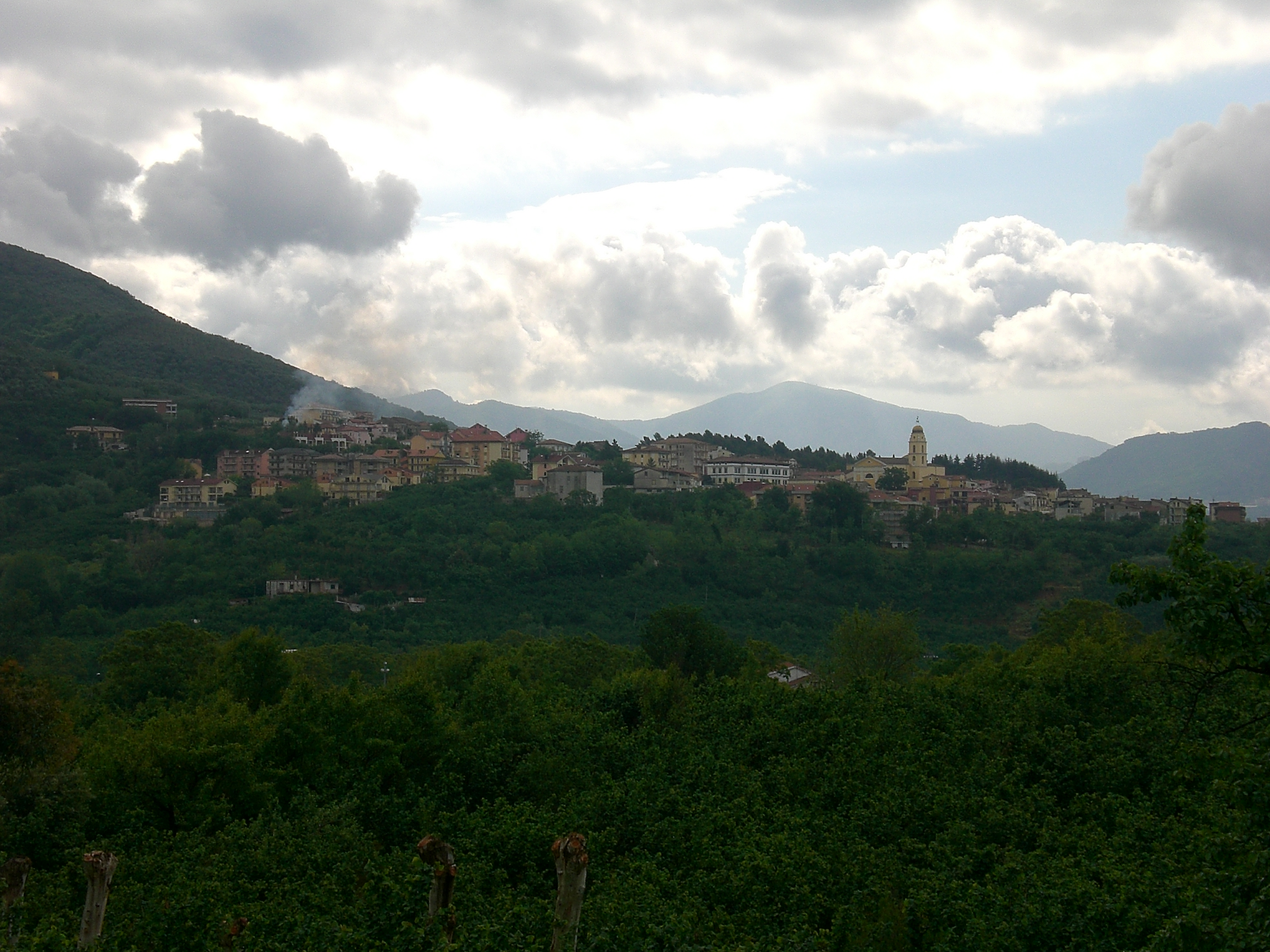
- View of Capitignano, the municipal seat.

- Coat of arms

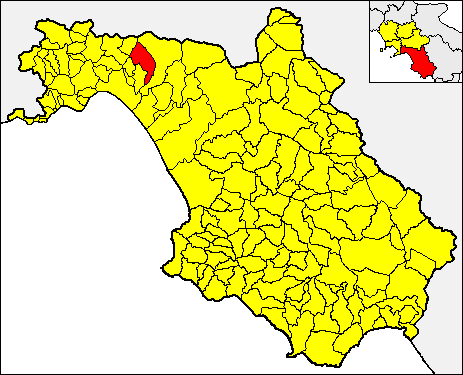
- Giffoni Sei Casali within the Province of Salerno and Campania

- Location within Italy Location within Campania
- Coordinates: 40°43′N 14°54′E
- Country: Italy
- Region: Campania
- Province: Salerno (SA)
- Frazioni: Capitignano (municipal seat), Malche, Prepezzano, Sieti

Government
  - Mayor: Francesco Munno

Area
  - Total: 35.08 km^{2} (13.54 sq mi)
- Elevation: 250 m (820 ft)

Population (28 February 2017)
  - Total: 5,213
  - Density: 148.6/km^{2} (384.9/sq mi)
- Demonym: Giffonesi
- Time zone: UTC+1 (CET)
  - Summer (DST): UTC+2 (CEST)
- Postal code: 84090
- Dialing code: 089
- Website: Official website

Giffoni Sei Casali (Campanian: Jfun) is a town and comune in the province of Salerno in the Campania region of south-western Italy.

== History ==
The communal seat, Capitignano, appeared when the Romans destroyed Picentia, whose inhabitants took refuge on the mountains nearby. The modern name, according to tradition, would derive from Caput Jani ("Janus' head"), referring to the head of statue of the god which they brought to the new site.

Capitignano was part of the Kingdom of Two Sicilies until 1860, as part of the district of Salerno.

== Geography ==
The municipality is situated in a hill zone by the Picentini mountain range. It borders with the municipalities of Calvanico, Castiglione del Genovesi, Fisciano, Giffoni Valle Piana and San Cipriano Picentino.

Giffoni is divided into four frazioni, Capitignano being the administrative seat. The other are Malche, Prepezzano and Sieti.

== See also ==
- Monti Picentini
- Giffoni Valle Piana
- Giffoni Film Festival
