= Monti Picentini Regional Park =

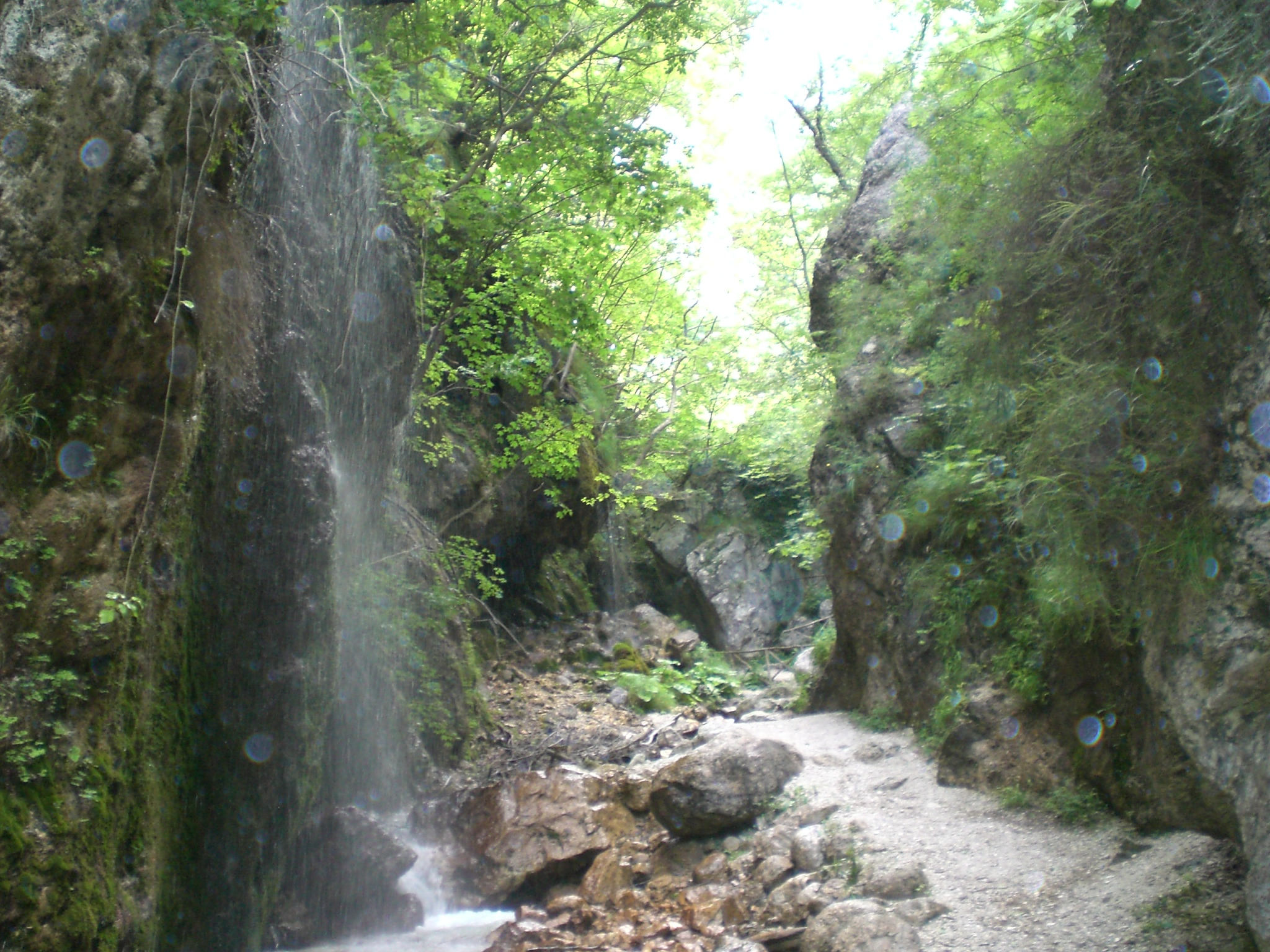
Valle della Caccia.

The Monti Picentini Regional Park (Italian: Parco regionale Monti Picentini) is a natural preserve in Campania, southern Italy.

== Geography ==
It is based on the Monti Picentini chain, a dolomitic-limestone area in the provinces of Avellino and Salerno. The park has a surface of 62,200 hectares and includes two natural oases: that of Monte Polveracchio and that of Valle della Caccia.

=== Mountains ===
- Monte Molaro

== Communes ==
The following communes lie within the Monti Picentini Regional Park:

Acerno, Bagnoli Irpino, Calabritto, Calvanico, Campagna, Caposele, Castelvetere sul Calore, Castiglione del Genovesi, Chiusano di San Domenico, Eboli, Fisciano, Giffoni Sei Casali, Giffoni Valle Piana, Lioni, Montecorvino Rovella, Montella, Montemarano, Montoro Superiore, Nusco, Olevano sul Tusciano, Oliveto Citra, San Cipriano Picentino, San Mango Piemonte, Santa Lucia di Serino, Santo Stefano del Sole, Senerchia, Serino, Solofra, Sorbo Serpico, Volturara Irpina.
