= Monte San Salvatore (Picentini) =

Mountain in Italy

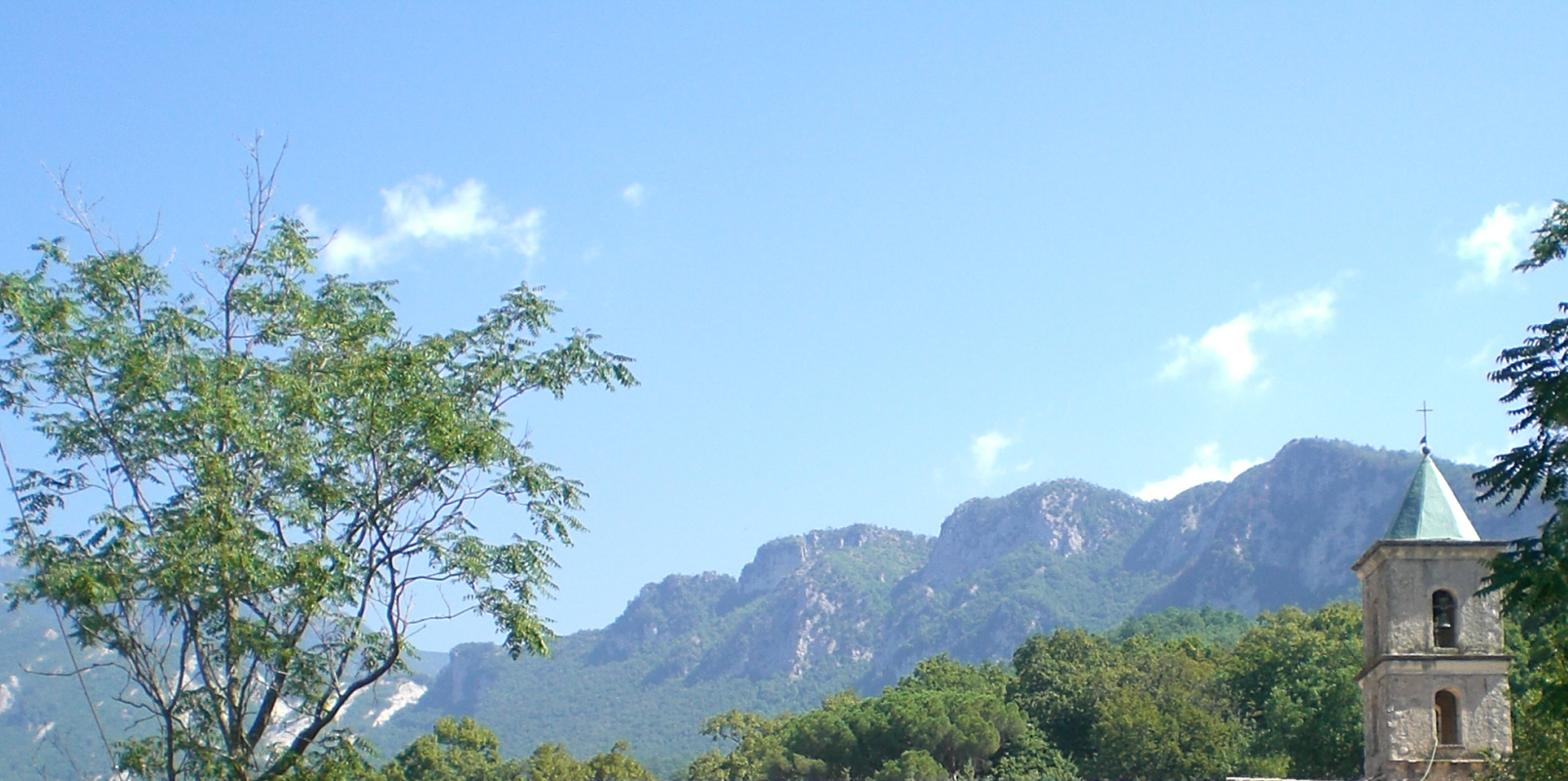

Highest point
- Elevation: 1,073 m (3,520 ft)
- Coordinates: 40°24′49″N 15°04′33″E

Geography
- Location within Italy
- Location: Campania, Italy
- Parent range: Apennine Mountains

Monte San Salvatore is a mountain in Campania, Italy, part of the Monti Picentini range.
