= Sattia gens =

Ancient Roman family

The gens Sattia was an obscure plebeian family of senatorial rank at ancient Rome. Members of this gens are known from the final century of the Republic to the time of Diocletian, but few of them held any of the higher offices of the Roman state.

== Praenomina ==
The main praenomina of the Sattii were Gaius, Sextus, Quintus, and Marcus, all of which were very common throughout Roman history.

== Members ==
This list includes abbreviated praenomina. For an explanation of this practice, see filiation.

- Gaius Sattius, named in an inscription from Praeneste in Latium, dating between 130 and 82 BC.
- Quintus Sattius, one of the priests of Hercules at Casilinum in Campania, named in an inscription dating between 130 and 50 BC.
- Gaius Sattius C. f., priest of Jupiter Optimus Maximus at Casilinum, named in an inscription dating to 108 BC.
- Sextus Sattius C. f. Scaevola, buried at Volturaria in Apulia, in the first half of the first century AD.
- Gaius Sattius C. f. Calatro, quaestor in AD 57.
- Sattia Victorina, the daughter of Tiberius Claudius Privatus, a freedman of the emperor, and Claudia Fortunata, who dedicated a monument at Rome to her father.
- Aulus Sattius Hebenus, one of those whose name was inscribed on the altar of Eternal Peace at Rome, built in AD 70.
- Sattia, buried at Rome, aged seventy-six, with her husband, the physician Gaius Mattius Lygdamus, in a tomb dating to the period of the Flavian dynasty.
- Gaius Sattius, a scout named in an inscription from Rome, dating to AD 126.
- Marcus Sattius Rufinus, a scout named in an inscription from Rome, dating to AD 144.
- Sattia Sabina, together with Titius Sabinianus, dedicated a monument at Lugdunum in Gallia Lugdunensis to their brother, Marcus Marclinius Lectus, a soldier in the thirteenth urban cohort, where he had served for six years, six months, and two days, dating to the latter half of the second century.
- Marcus Sattius Felix, a prefect in the century of Marcus Julius Tauriscus, serving in the fifth cohort of the vigiles, at the beginning of the third century.
- Marcus Sattius Felix, a prison guard in the fifth cohort of the vigiles, at the beginning of the third century.
- Publius Sattius Firminus, a soldier in the century of Tiberius Claudius Rufinus, serving in the fifth cohort of the vigiles, at the beginning of the third century.
- Sattius Clemens, a Roman senator in the time of Diocletian, was one of the municipal officials of Beneventum in Campania.
- Quintus Sattius Flavius Vettius Gratus, a senator and augur named in an inscription from Rhegium in Bruttium, dating between AD 280 and 330.

=== Undated Sattii ===
- Sattia L. f., named in several inscriptions of uncertain origin.
- Gaius Sattius C. f., the patron of Gaius Sattius Felix, perhaps his freedman, named in an inscription from Mediolanum in Cisalpine Gaul.
- Quintus Sattius Q. l. Acceptus, a freedman buried at Venafrum in Samnium.
- Sextus Sattius Sex. f. Agathyrsus, buried at Rome with a monument from his father, Sextus Sattius Hermes, aged eighteen years, two months, and two days.
- Gaius Sattius Amandus, dedicated a tomb at Rome to his wife, Sattia Tryphosa.
- Sattia Athenais, built a tomb at Ostia in Latium for her son, Sattius Felix.
- Sattius Demetrius, dedicated a tomb at Rome for his daughter, Sattia Onomaste.
- Sattia Ɔ. l. Erotis, a freedwoman buried at Rome, aged eight.
- Sattius Felix, buried at Ostia with a monument from his mother, Sattia Athenais.
- Gaius Sattius C. l. Felix, a freedman, and the client of Gaius Sattius, named in an inscription from Mediolanum.
- Sextus Sattius Sex. l. Hermes, the freedman of Sextus Sattius Olympicus, dedicated a tomb at Rome to his son, Sextus Sattius Agathyrsus.
- Sattia Januaria, buried at Beneventum in Campania, aged thirty-seven years, seven months, and eight days, with a monument from her husband, Sextus Marius Hilarus, with whom she lived for twenty-three years, nine months, and eleven days.
- Marcus Sattius Januarius, a soldier in the second cohort of the vigiles, buried at Rufrae, aged twenty-two years and six months, with a monument from his parents, Fullius Januarius and Sattia Tymele.
- Sattia Myrtale, buried at Nemausus in Gallia Narbonensis, with a monument from her daughter, Maximia Calvina, and sons, the Calvini Myrtalores.
- Sextus Sattius Olympicus, built tombs at Rome for his wife, Oppia Primitiva, daughter, Marciana, and son, Sextus Sattius Olympus; buried at Rome by a younger son also named Sattius Olympus.
- Sextus Sattius Sex. f. Olympus, buried at Rome, aged two years, ten months, and twenty-two days, with a monument from his father, Sextus Sattius Olympicus.
- Sattius Sex. f. Olympus, a younger son of Sextus Sattius Olympicus, who dedicated a monument to his father.
- Sattia Onomaste, buried at Rome, aged eight years, eight months, and nine days, with a monument from her father, Sattius Demetrius.
- Sextus Sattius Ɔ. l. Philogenes, a freedman named in an inscription from Rome.
- Gaius Sattius C. f. Sattianus, buried at Rome, aged twenty-three years, nine months, and twenty-eight days.
- Sattia Silvia, buried at Beneventum with her husband, Gaius Modius Felix, sons, Gaius Modius Felix and Cocceius Silvinus, and freedman, Modius Renatus.
- Sattia Silvina, buried at the present site of Montefalcione in Campania, aged thirty-two years, ten months, and ten days.
- Sattia Tryphosa, buried at Rome, aged fifty-six, with a monument from her husband, Gaius Sattius Amandus.

== See also ==
- List of Roman gentes

== Bibliography ==
- Theodor Mommsen et alii, Corpus Inscriptionum Latinarum (The Body of Latin Inscriptions, abbreviated CIL), Berlin-Brandenburgische Akademie der Wissenschaften (1853–present).
- René Cagnat et alii, L'Année épigraphique (The Year in Epigraphy, abbreviated AE), Presses Universitaires de France (1888–present).
- Paul von Rohden, Elimar Klebs, & Hermann Dessau, Prosopographia Imperii Romani (The Prosopography of the Roman Empire, abbreviated PIR), Berlin (1898).
