= Picentini =

Picentini may refer to:

- Picentes, the ancient Italic people from the Picenum region
- Monti Picentini, a mountain range in Campania, Italy
