= Tusciano =

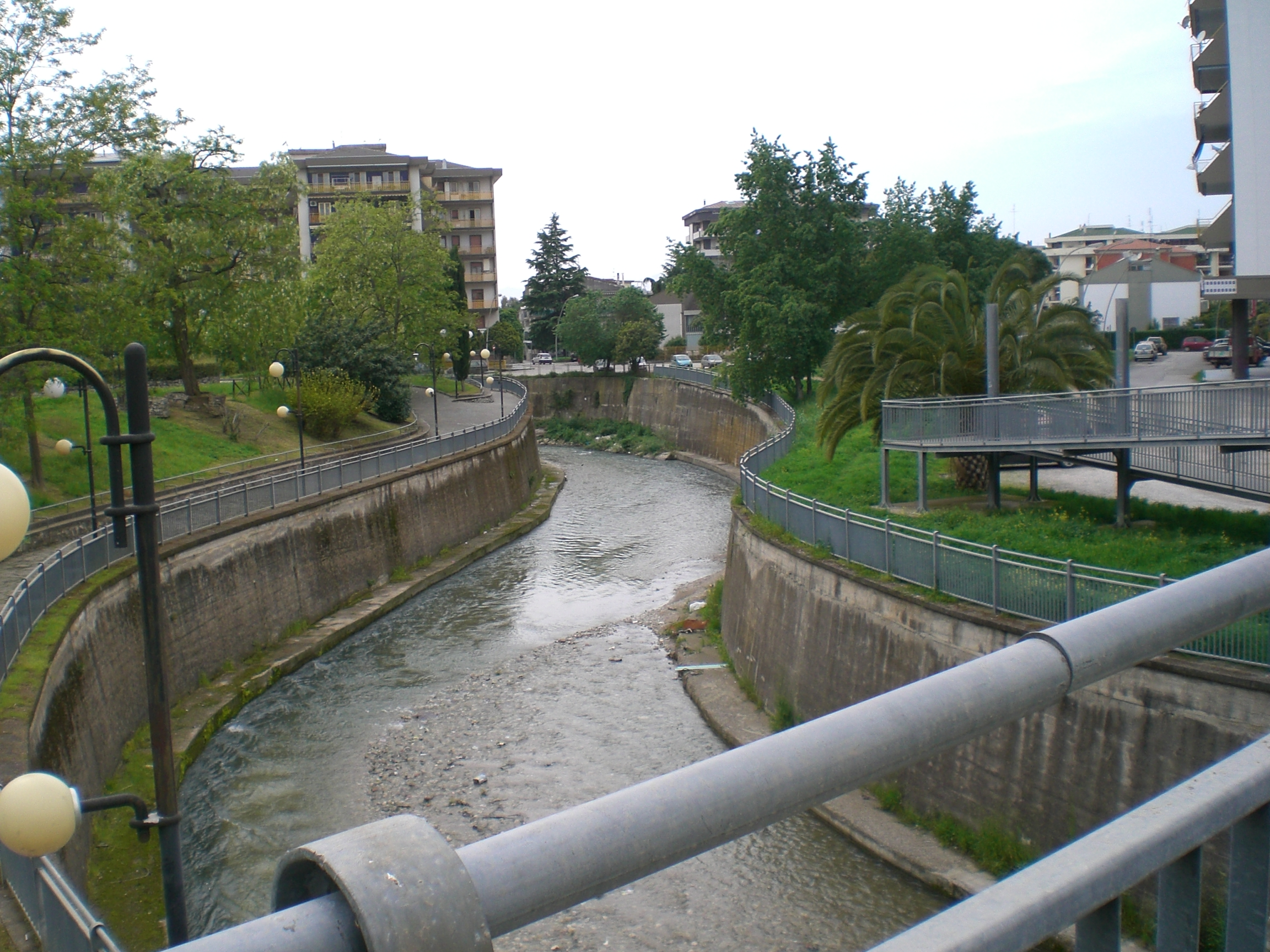
- The river at Battipaglia.

Location
- Country: Italy

Physical characteristics
- Source
  - location: Monte Polveracchio / Monte Cervialto
- Mouth: Tyrrhenian Sea
  - location: Gulf of Salerno
  - coordinates: 40.5797°N 14.8834°E
- Length: 37 km (23 mi)

The Tusciano is a river of Campania in southern Italy.

== Course ==
The source is between Monte Polveracchio and Monte Cervialto, in the Monti Picentini range of the southern Apennines. It passes through the territories of Acerno and Campagna, where it runs at the foot of Monte Costa Calda, then enters the commune of Olevano sul Tusciano. Having passed the settlements of Ariano and Monticelli it crosses Battipaglia to flow into the Tyrrhenian Sea at Spineta on the Gulf of Salerno.

== Tributaries ==
Its left tributary is the Canale Acque Alte Tusciano; its right tributaries are the torrents Cornea, Isca della Serra, Lama, Rialto and Vallemonio.

== Hydropower ==
At Presa, a locality of Olevano sul Tusciano, part of the water is diverted to the hydroelectric power station at Ariano. This, the earliest hydropower facility to be built in southern Italy, was planned in 1895 and constructed during the years 1901–1905 for the Società Meridionale di Elettricità.

== Notes ==
This article originated as a translation of ‘Tusciano’ its counterpart in the Italian Wikipedia.
