= Falivene =

Falivene is a surname. Notable people with the surname include:

- Agostino Falivene (died 1548), Italian bishop
- Carl Falivene (c. 1927–2015), American football player and coach
