= Castiglione del Genovesi =

- Comune
- Comune di Castiglione del Genovesi
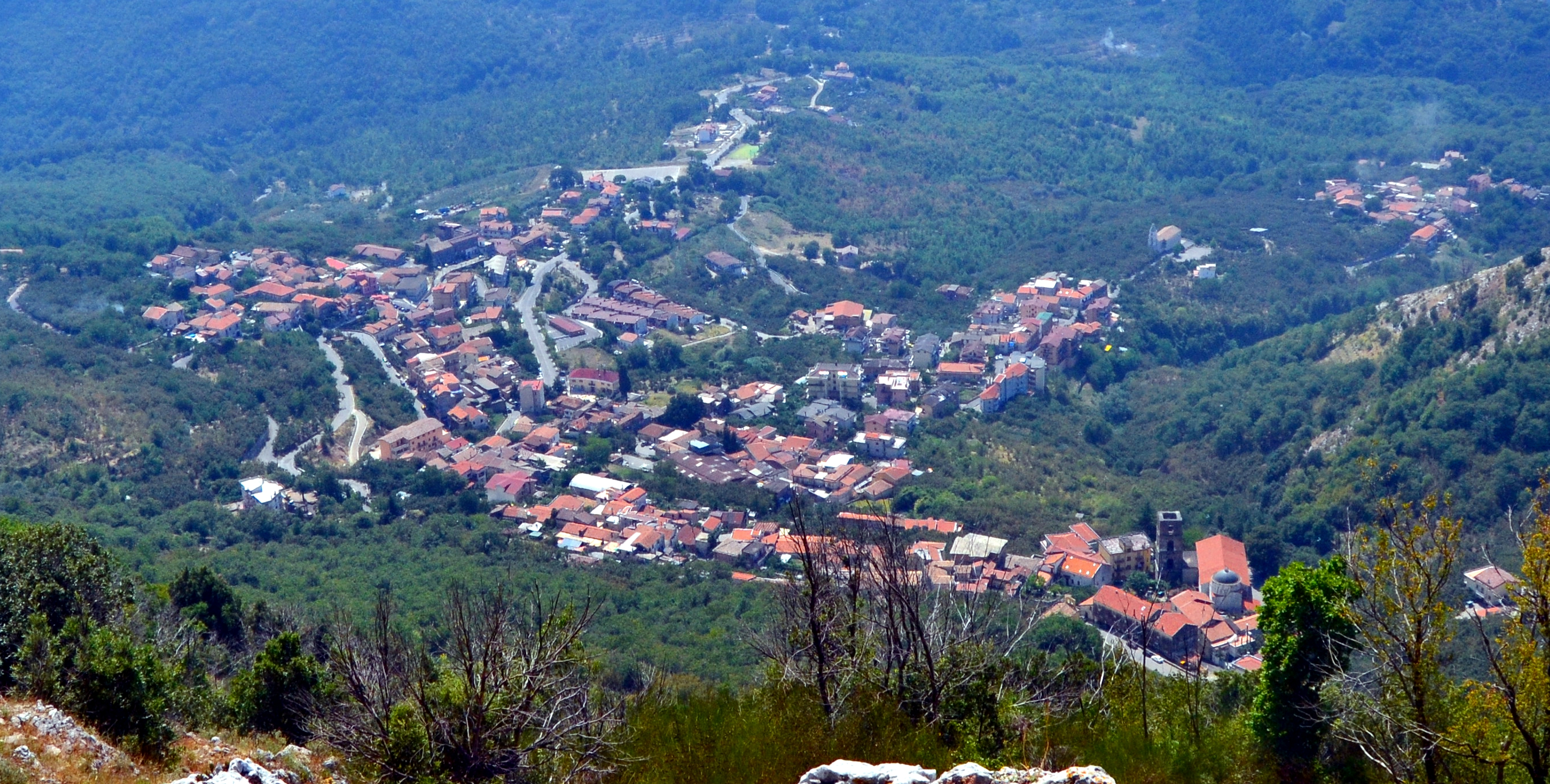

- Coat of arms

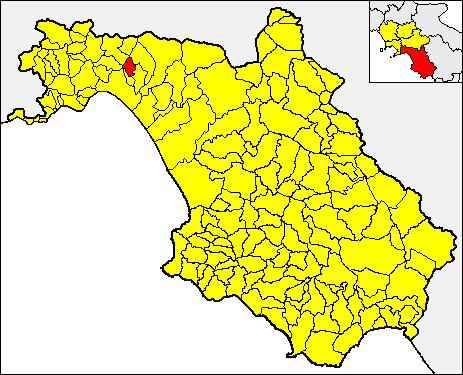
- Castiglione within the Province of Salerno

- Location within Italy Location within Campania
- Coordinates: 40°44′N 14°51′E
- Country: Italy
- Region: Campania
- Province: Salerno (SA)

Government
  - Mayor: Generoso Matteo Bottigliero

Area
  - Total: 10.41 km^{2} (4.02 sq mi)
- Elevation: 598 m (1,962 ft)

Population (28 February 2017)
  - Total: 1,380
  - Density: 133/km^{2} (343/sq mi)
- Demonym: Castiglionesi
- Time zone: UTC+1 (CET)
  - Summer (DST): UTC+2 (CEST)
- Postal code: 84090
- Dialing code: 089
- ISTAT code: 065036
- Website: Official website

Castigloine del Genovesi is a town and comune in the province of Salerno in the Campania region of south-western Italy.

Until 1862 it was known simply as Castiglione. It takes its current name from the philosopher and economist Antonio Genovesi, who was born here in 1713.

Located on the hillside below the Monte Monna, part of the Monti Picentini Regional Park, Castiglione borders with the municipalities of Baronissi, Fisciano, Giffoni Sei Casali, Salerno, San Cipriano Picentino and San Mango Piemonte.
