= Terminio =

Mountain in Italy

Coordinates: 40°51′N 14°52′E

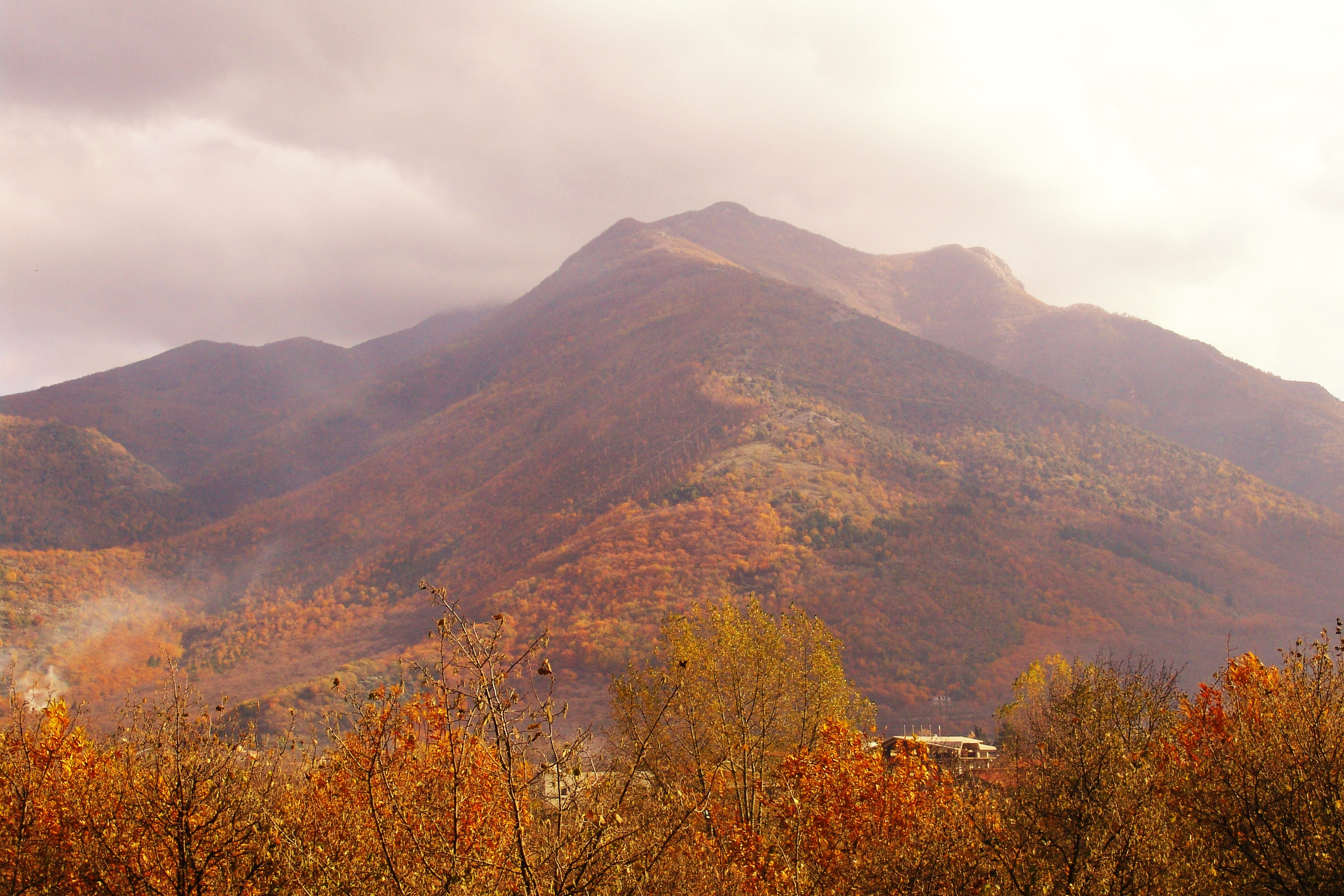

Highest point
- Elevation: 1,806 m (5,925 ft)
- Prominence: 954 m (3,130 ft)

Geography
- Location within Italy
- Location: Campania, Italy
- Parent range: Apennines

Terminio is a mountain massif in Campania, southern Italy. It rises to 1,806 m (5,925 ft) above sea level in Irpinia, at the northern end of the Picentini Mountains. The massif has a dome-shaped profile, with steep slopes overlooking the Sabato valley and gentler slopes descending towards the Calore valley.

Terminio is situated within the Monti Picentini Regional Park. Its massif contains an extensive karst aquifer formed principally from fractured and karstified Cretaceous limestone. The aquifer covers approximately 170 km^{2} (66 sq mi) and supplies springs used by water systems serving parts of Campania, Basilicata and Apulia.
