= Molaro =

Molaro may refer to:

- Molaro (surname), Italian surname
- Monte Molaro, mountain of the Picentini mountains, Italy
- 30379 Molaro, a minor planet
- Molaro, human settlement of the municipality of Montebello Ionico, Calabria, Italy.

== See also ==
- Molar (disambiguation)
