= Monte Nero (Picentini) =

Mountain in Italy

- Location within Italy

Highest point
- Elevation: 1,142 m (3,747 ft)
- Coordinates: 40°24′52″N 15°06′03″E

Geography
- Location: Campania, Italy
- Parent range: Apennines

Monte Nero is a mountain in Picentini Mountains Regional Park in Campania, Italy and part of the Monti Picentini mountain range.

== Geology ==
The mountain range it is part of is composed of dolomite and limestone and has led to the formation of karst mountain from erosion and dissolution of the limestone.
