= San Mango Piemonte =

- Comune
- Comune di San Mango Piemonte
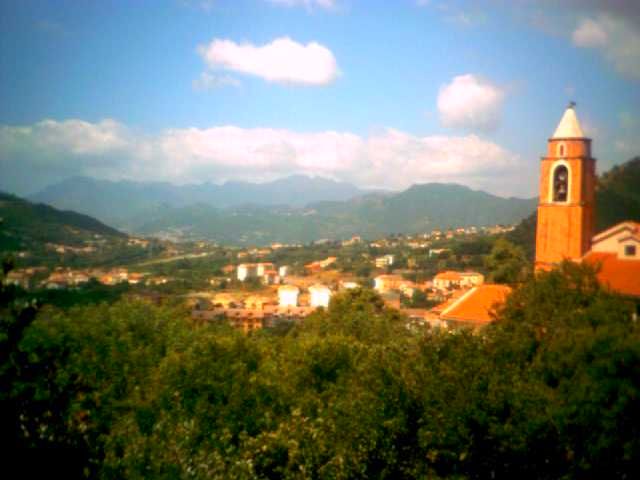

- Coat of arms

- Location within Italy Location within Campania
- Coordinates: 40°42′N 14°50′E
- Country: Italy
- Region: Campania
- Province: Salerno (SA)
- Frazioni: Monticelli, Piedimonte, Procuoio, Trinità, Chiusa, Casa Calce, Roscigno.

Government
  - Mayor: Francesco Di Giacomo

Area
  - Total: 6.02 km^{2} (2.32 sq mi)
- Elevation: 240 m (790 ft)

Population (31 December 2010)
  - Total: 2,644
  - Density: 439/km^{2} (1,140/sq mi)
- Demonym: Sanmanghesi
- Time zone: UTC+1 (CET)
  - Summer (DST): UTC+2 (CEST)
- Postal code: 84090
- Dialing code: 089
- Patron saint: St. Magnus of Anagni
- Saint day: 19 August
- Website: Official website

San Mango Piemonte is a village and comune in the province of Salerno in the Campania region of southern Italy.

It is an agricultural centre at the foot of the Monti Picentini, founded in 88 BC after the destruction of Picentia by the Romans.

== Geography ==
The village is bordered by Castiglione del Genovesi, Salerno and San Cipriano Picentino

== Sports ==
The village's well-known football team is ASD Temeraria 1957.
