= El Molar =

El Molar can refer to:

- El Molar, Madrid, Community of Madrid, Spain
- El Molar, Priorat, Province of Tarragona, Catalonia, Spain

== See also ==
- Los Molares, Seville, Spain
- Molar (disambiguation)
