= Molaro (surname) =

Molaro is an Italian surname. Notable people with the surname include:

- Carmine Molaro (born 1975), Italian former boxer
- Robert S. Molaro (1950–2020), American politician
- Steven Molaro (born 1972), American television producer and writer

== See also ==
- Molaro (disambiguation)
