= Giffoni Film Festival =

Annual children's film festival held in Giffoni Valle Piana, Campania, Italy

Coordinates: 40°43′00″N 14°56′30″E

Giffoni International Film Festival
- Location: Giffoni Valle Piana, Italy
- Founded: 1971
- Artistic director: Claudio Gubitosi
- Website: https://www.giffonifilmfestival.it/en/

The Giffoni International Film Festival is an Italian children's film festival which takes place annually in Giffoni Valle Piana, Campania. It began in 1971. The Giffoni International Film Festival typically has around 100,000 guests and has had events in other countries, such as the Giffoni Hollywood Film Festival in the United States.

== History ==
The Giffoni Film Festival was founded in 1971 by Claudio Gubitosi, and was hosted in Giffoni Valle Piana, Campania. As earlier editions (connected with the Salerno Film Festival) had limited budgets and a small number of films, the festival began to bring in films from Northern Europe and Soviet Union.

During the 1980s the amount of children's films increased and films coming from France, Albania, Spain, Sweden, Norway, Canada, Iran, Australia, Poland and New Zealand were imported. In 1982, François Truffaut attended the festival and wrote "[o]f all the film festivals Giffoni is the most necessary". In the following years, Robert De Niro, Sergio Leone, Michelangelo Antonioni, and Alberto Sordi attended the festival.

In 1997, the first stone of the "Cittadella del Cinema" in Giffoni was put down, beginning the Giffoni Multimedia Valley project. Between 1996 and 1998, the festival started three different competitive categories: First Screens, for children aged from 9 to 12, Free to Fly, for children aged from 12 to 14 years, and Y-Generation (formerly Rear Window), for youths from 15 to 19 years.

Berlin and Miami hosted its Next Generation Film Festival. Poland and Albania hosted the Giffoni Film Festival concept. The Giffoni-Australia Association was founded in 2005, based in Sydney. In 2008, the first edition of the Giffoni Hollywood Film Festival took place at the Kodak Theatre. The Giffoni World Alliance was also founded. In 2016, it was announced that Jennifer Aniston would attend the festival.

== Giffoni Experience ==
The Giffoni Experience is the brand that co-ordinates all the activities of Giffoni Cinema Citadel as the International Film Festival and the School Experience

The Giffoni Film Festival (1971) is split in 10 section, grant the Gryphon Award for the winning director of each category:

- Short animation films: Elements +3
- Short film: Elements +6, Elements +10 and Parental Experience
- Feature length films: Elements +6, Elements +10, Generator +15, Generator +16 and Generator +18
- Feature Documentaries: GEX Doc

The Giffoni School Experience (2019) is a traveling festival among the schools of the Italian peninsula that crown each year 10 different projects with the School Experience Festival Award:

- Feature Experience: Category +6,+11 and +14
- Short Experience: Category +3, +6, +11 and +14
- Your Experience: Category +6,+11 and +14

The Avrei Questa Idea (2023) is a pitch competition developed by Giffoni Innovation Hub to find new scripts for the Italian cinema system that crown each year 10 different projects with the School Experience Festival Award

== See also ==
- Salerno Film Festival
