= Volturara Irpina =

- Comune
- Comune di Volturara Irpina
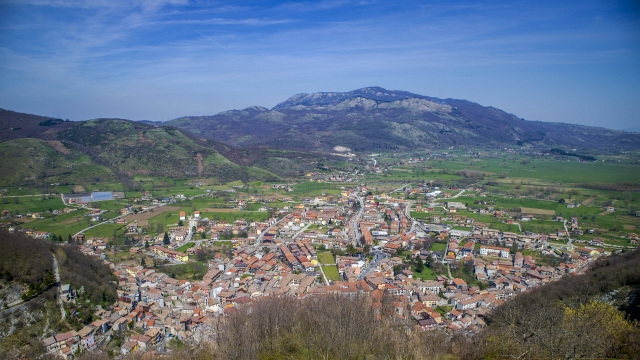
- View of Volturara Irpina from Monte San Michele

- Coat of arms

- Location within Italy Location within Campania
- Coordinates: 40°53′N 14°55′E
- Country: Italy
- Region: Campania
- Province: Avellino (AV)
- Frazioni: Tavernole

Government
  - Mayor: Marino Sarno

Area
  - Total: 32.42 km^{2} (12.52 sq mi)
- Elevation: 620 m (2,030 ft)

Population (31 December 2017)
  - Total: 3,207
  - Density: 98.92/km^{2} (256.2/sq mi)
- Demonym: Volturaresi
- Time zone: UTC+1 (CET)
  - Summer (DST): UTC+2 (CEST)
- Postal code: 83050
- Dialing code: 0825
- Patron saint: St. Nicholas of Bari
- Saint day: 6 December
- Website: Official website

Volturara Irpina (Irpino: Otrale) is a town and comune in the province of Avellino, Campania, Italy. It is located in the Monti Picentini area, at the foot of the Terminio.

== History ==
The existence of the first settlements in Volturara Irpina dates back to Roman times: it is assumed that, following the destruction of the legendary Sabatia, guilty of having given its support to Hannibal during the second Punic war against Rome, part of its population moved between the Upper Sabato Valley and the area of the Picentini Mountains, creating numerous settlements, including the original one of Volturara.

This hypothesis seems to be supported by the fact that, throughout the municipal territory, some tombstones have been found, of which, today, no trace remains, but whose content was wisely described by the priest Pasquale Di Meo, grandson of the great historian of the Kingdom of Naples Alessandro (1726-1786).

The medieval Norman Castle was built during the Swabian-Norman domination. The ruling dynasty of Aragon transformed the Castle into a noble residence. The hamlet was first recorded in 976 and its name was "Volturaria".

The Castle was the property of several lords in its history, among them Guglielmo de Tivilla who sent troops in the Holy Land during the crusades. Volturara Castle passed to the ownership of Nicola della Marra in 1303 remained in the ownership of the della Marra family until the 16th century. Today the Castle has four quadrangular angle-Towers that are no more than twelve m. high and has also a wide courtyard.

== Urban Legend ==
Legend has it that, in the area where the Piana del Dragone stands today, a prince named Gesio managed to kill a three-headed dragon with his sword. Once it lost the duel, the monster sank into the bowels of the earth, creating three holes dug by its three heads, giving rise to the natural sinkhole, called Dragon’s Mouth and still visible today.

== Economy ==
Economy is based on the production of chestnuts and the famous Volturara Irpina Quarantino beans. Known as the Quarantino due to the length of time it takes to mature—quaranta (40) days—the Volturara Irpina bean is small, irregular and has a thin, ash-white skin.
