= Giffoni Valle Piana =

- Comune
- Comune di Giffoni Valle Piana
- Coat of arms

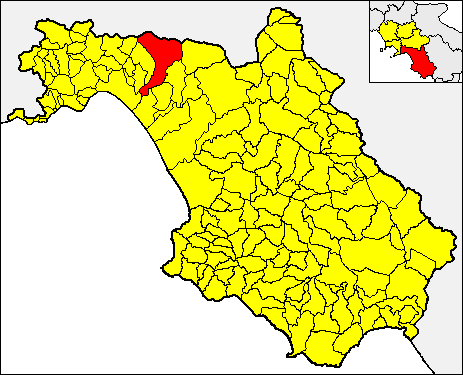
- Giffoni Valle Piana within the Province of Salerno and Campania

- Location within Italy Location within Campania
- Coordinates: 40°43′N 14°56′E
- Country: Italy
- Region: Campania
- Province: Salerno (SA)
- Frazioni: Mercato (communal seat), Catelde, Chiaravallisi, Chieve, Curti, Curticelle, Ornito, San Giovanni, Santa Caterina, Santa Maria a Vico, Sardone, Sovvieco, Terravecchia, Vassi

Government
  - Mayor: Antonio Giuliano

Area
  - Total: 88.61 km^{2} (34.21 sq mi)
- Elevation: 196 m (643 ft)

Population (28 February 2017)
  - Total: 11,927
  - Density: 134.6/km^{2} (348.6/sq mi)
- Demonym: Giffonesi
- Time zone: UTC+1 (CET)
  - Summer (DST): UTC+2 (CEST)
- Postal code: 84095
- Dialing code: 089
- Website: Official website

Giffoni Valle Piana, commonly known as Giffoni, is a town and comune in the Province of Salerno, Campania, southwestern Italy.

Economy is mostly based on agriculture, with the presence of a small number of light industries and services firms.

== History ==
Giffoni area was the seat of the ancient town of Picentia, which was destroyed two times by the Romans in the course of their conquest of southern Italy.

== Geography ==
The town is situated in a hill zone by the Picentini mountains. The municipality is extended from the urban and industrial area between Salerno and Pontecagnano to the mountain range at the borders with the Province of Avellino. It borders with the municipalities of Acerno, Calvanico, Giffoni Sei Casali, Montecorvino Pugliano, Montecorvino Rovella, Montella, Pontecagnano Faiano, Salerno, San Cipriano Picentino and Serino.

Giffoni is divided into 14 frazioni and Mercato, commonly also identified simply as Giffoni Valle Piana, is the administrative seat. The other parishes are Catelde, Chiaravallisi, Chieve, Curti, Curticelle, Ornito, San Giovanni, Santa Caterina, Santa Maria a Vico, Sardone, Sovvieco, Terravecchia and Vassi.

== Giffoni Film Festival ==
Since 1971 the town has hosted the biggest international children's film festival of the world.

== Notable people ==
- Agostino Falivene (?−1548), Roman Catholic bishop

== See also ==
- Monti Picentini
- Giffoni Sei Casali
