= Monte Molaro =

Mountain in Italy

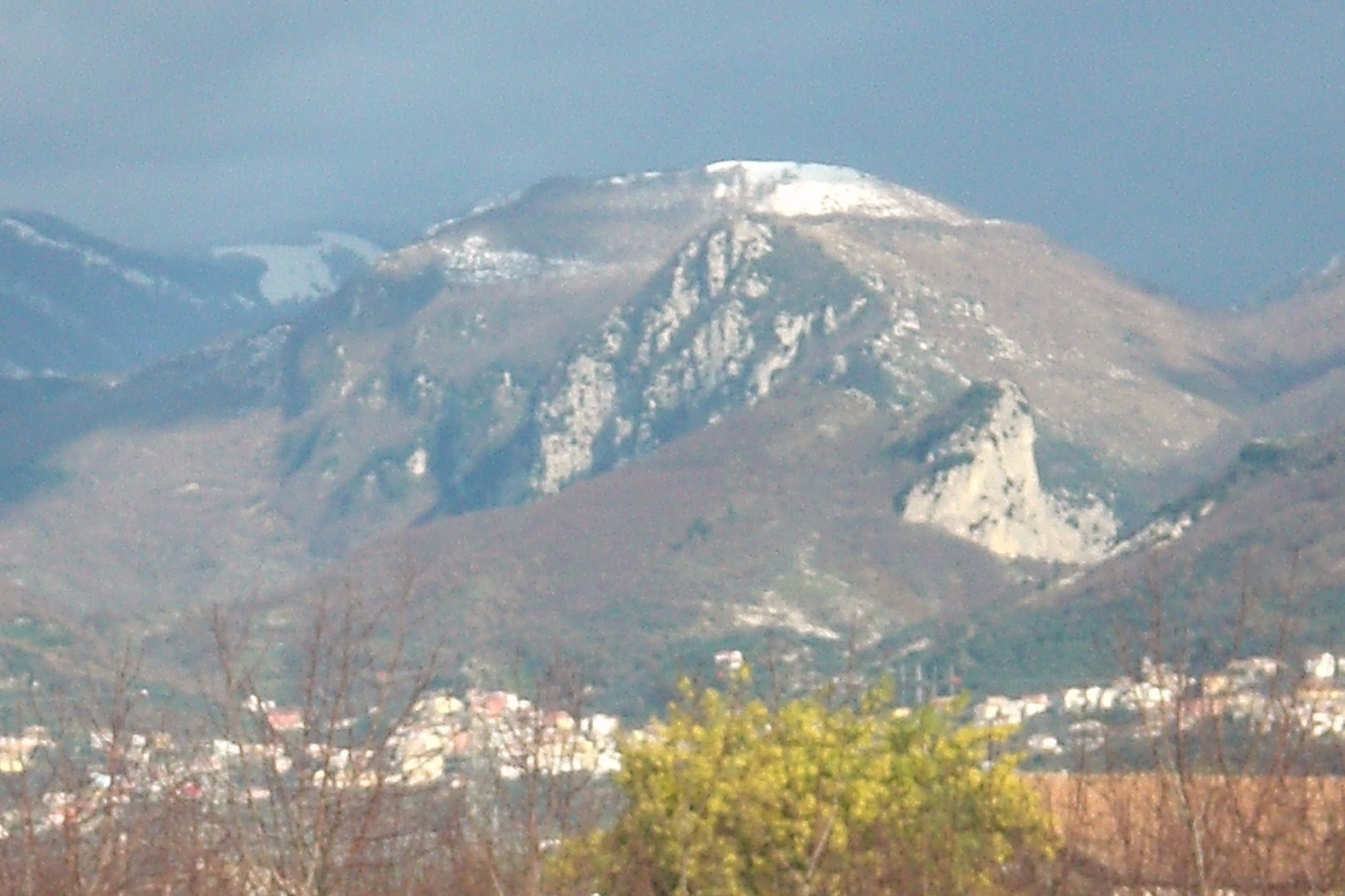

Highest point
- Elevation: 1,210 m (3,970 ft)
- Coordinates: 40°24′09″N 15°02′01″E

Geography
- Location within Italy
- Location: Campania, Italy
- Parent range: Apennines

Monte Molaro is a mountain between the towns of Campania and Olevano Romano in Picentini Regional Park and is part of the Picentini mountains.

== Description ==
Calcareous-dolomite, together with Monte Ripalta, Raione Monte, and Monte Costa Warm forms the watershed between the basins of the river Tusciano to the west and the river Tenza to the east. The mountain is covered by forests of oak, chestnut, rates while the top is occupied by prairie.

== Paths ==
From San Donato of Eboli, through a country road, you can reach the plateau above the mountain, then the mountain Ripalta Molaro. By country, along the path departing from the neighborhood Zappino, reached the summit of Mount Ripalta, you can continue until you reach the summit of Raione and Molaro. On the top is the Casone Melaina, a haven of service of the woodcutter.
