= Polveracchio =

Mountain in Italy

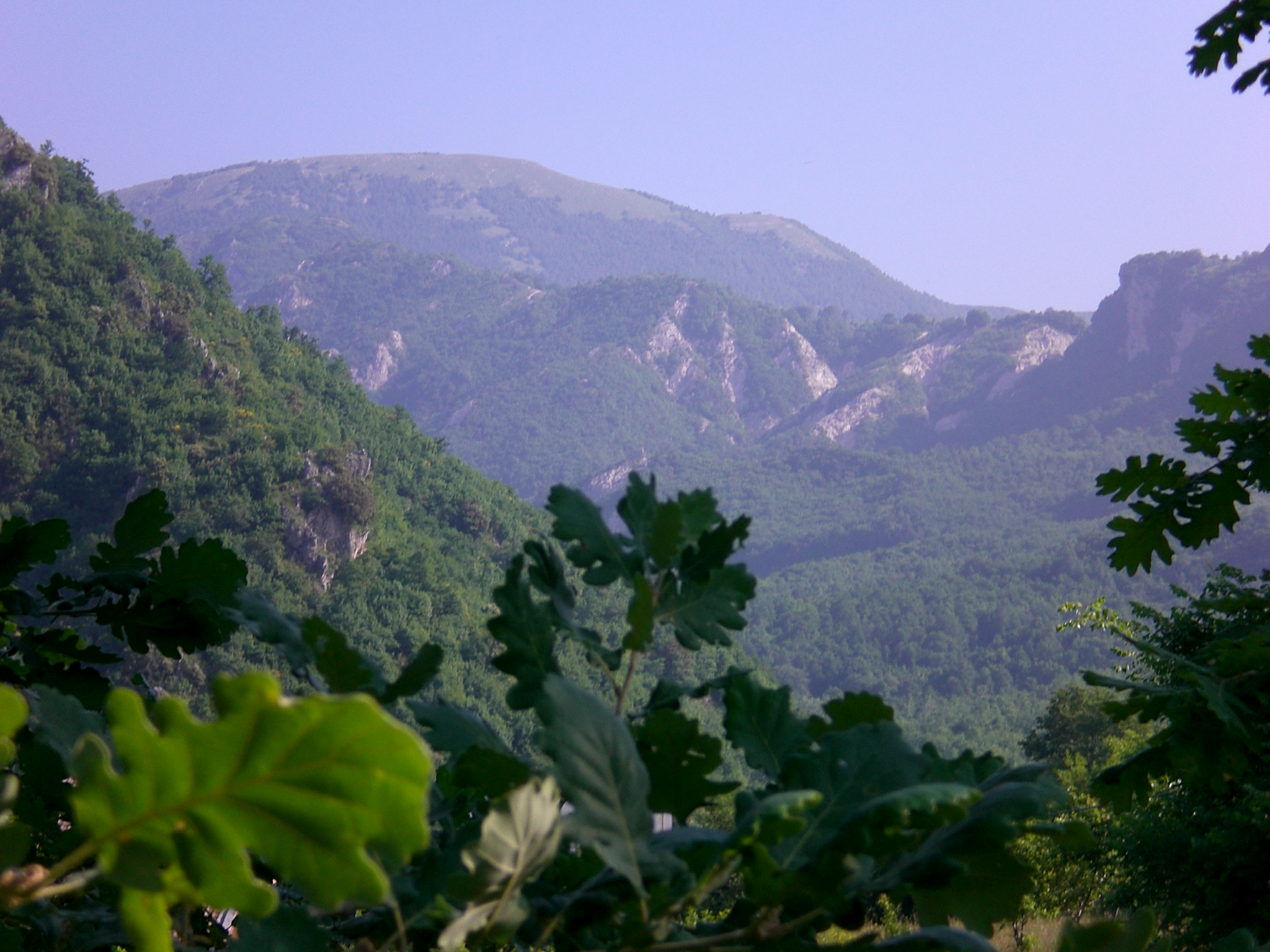
- Monte Polveracchio and the Valle della Cerreta.

Highest point
- Elevation: 1,790 m (5,870 ft)
- Coordinates: 40°43′24″N 15°7′41″E

Geography
- Location within Italy
- Location: Campania, Italy
- Parent range: Apennines

Polveracchio is a mountain of the Monti Picentini, Campania, Italy. It is 1,790m high and is included in the eponymous natural oasis, established in 1988, which is in turn part of the Monti Picentini Regional Park.
