= Giacinto de' Sivo =

Italian historian (1814–1867)

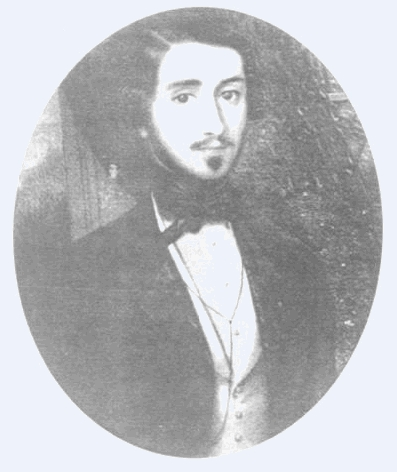
- Giacinto de' Sivo
- Born: 29 November 1814; Maddaloni, Kingdom of Naples
- Died: 19 November 1867 (aged 52); Rome, Papal States
- Resting place: Campo Verano
- Occupations: Historian; Politician; Poet; Novelist
- Spouse: Costanza Gaetani dell'Aquila d'Aragona (m. 1844)
- Writing career
- Language: Italian
- Genres: treatise; novel; drama
- Notable work: Storia delle Due Sicilie dal 1847 al 1861
- Literary movement: Romanticism

Giacinto de' Sivo (29 November 1814 – 19 November 1867) was an Italian politician, historian and journalist. De' Sivo was a leading legitimist historian after the fall of the Kingdom of the Two Sicilies and his books provided the main intellectual support in the struggle to undermine the legitimacy of the Kingdom of Italy.

== Biography ==
Giacinto de' Sivo in the southern Italian town of Maddaloni to a family of long loyalty to the House of Bourbon. His grandfather fought for the Sanfedisti in 1799. As a young man he frequented the most famous private school of the time at Naples, directed by Basilio Puoti. De’ Sivo served in various state positions in the Two Sicilies: a member of the Commission for Public Education, in 1848 he was appointed Councilor of Intendance of the province of Terra di Lavoro. In January 1849 he was appointed commander of one of the four companies of the National Guard of Maddaloni. On 14 September 1860 he was arrested for refusing to pay homage to Garibaldi. In 1861 he published his first historical essay Italy and its political drama in 1861 (L'Italia e il suo dramma politico nel 1861), in which he judged the unification process as elitist and distant from the interests of the people, led by gun violence and the spread of lies. As a result, and despite the risk of persecution and difficulty to find printers willing to publish his works, de' Sivo developed his most representative work, History of the Two Sicilies from 1847 to 1861 (Storia delle Due Sicilie dal 1847 al 1861), published in five volumes between 1862 and 1867, and reissued twice afterward.

In his works, he described the unification process as an assault against two sovereign states (the Kingdom of the Two Sicilies and the Papal States), in violation of international law and in particular of the spiritual and civil values of the Italian nation. He challenged the victors' assertion that they had 'liberated' Italy: unification merely meant the conquest of Italy by the Kingdom of Sardinia, itself the servant of powers beyond the Alps; the maladministration of the new government had reduced the Neapolitans to misery and despair. De' Sivo's history offers valuable insights into the political crisis of the Kingdom of the Two Sicilies and the brigandage that followed the unification of Italy. The thought of de' Sivo was long the subject of ostracism, in spite of Benedetto Croce had highlighted his thickness as a scholar by writing a biography that was included in the work A family of patriots (Una famiglia di patrioti).

== Works ==
- Costantino Dracosa tragedia storica (in Italian). Naples: dai torchi del Tramater. 1841.
- Corrado Capece. Storia pugliese dei tempi di Manfredi (in Italian). Naples: tipografia Carluccio. 1846.
- L'Italia e il suo dramma politico nel 1861 (in Italian). Bruxelles. 1861.
- Discorso pe' morti del Volturno (in Italian). Rome. 1861.
- Sivo, Giacinto De' (1861). I Napolitani al cospetto delle nazioni civili (in Italian). Livorno.
- Storia delle Due Sicilie dal 1847 al 1861, Vol. I, Rome, 1863; Vol. II, Rome, 1864; Vol. III, Verona, 1865; Vol. IV and V, Viterbo, 1867.

== Bibliography ==
- Croce, Benedetto (1918). Uno storico reazionario: Giacinto De Sivo (in Italian). Naples: Tipografia Giannini.
- Croce, Benedetto (1918). Francesco Paolo Bozzelli e Giacinto De Sivo: due note lette all'Accademia Pontaniana nella tornata del 17 febbraio 1918 (in Italian). Naples: R. Stab. tip. F. Giannini & figli.
- Vitelli, Andrea (1930). "Lo storico delle Due Sicilie: Giacinto De Sivo". Spigolature e Curiosità di Storia Napoletana (in Italian). Naples.
- Croce, Benedetto (1949). Una famiglia di patrioti ed altri saggi storici e critici (in Italian). Bari: Laterza. pp. 147–160.
- Maturi, Walter (1962). Interpretazioni del Risorgimento (in Italian). Turin: Einaudi. pp. 331–334.
- Mascia, Roberto (1966). La vita e le opere di Giacinto De Sivo (in Italian). Naples: Berisio.
- Mendella, Michelangelo (1969). "Sull'opera letteraria e storica di Giacinto de' Sivo" (PDF). La Rassegna Storica dei Comuni (in Italian). 1: 333–339.
- Del Ninno, Giuseppe Maria (1974). "Uno storico reazionario: Giacinto De Sivo". Il Conciliatore (in Italian) (11–12).
- Giuseppe Maria Del Ninno, ed. (1976). Risorgimento e controrivoluzione (in Italian). Rome: Volpe.
- Menna, Pietro (1977). "Le fonti della «Storia delle Due Sicilie» di G. De Sivo in alcuni documenti borbonici" [The sources of G. De Sivo's «History of the two Sicilies» in some Bourbon documents]. Rassegna degli Archivi di Stato (in Italian). XXXVII (1–3): 44–59.
- D'Agostino, Stefania (1990). "Giacinto de' Sivo scrittore reazionario". Studi Storici Meridionali (in Italian). X (2): 211–219.
- Iorio, Bruno (2001). Il primato napolitano. Studi su Giacinto de' Sivo e altri saggi (in Italian). Naples: Loffredo.
- Del Corno, Nicola (2011). "Giacinto De Sivo". Giuseppe Garibaldi Due Secoli di Interpretazioni (in Italian). Gangemi Editore: 133–135.
- Gin, Emilio (2016). "L'Italia contesa. "Nazione Napoletana" e "Nazione Italiana" in Giacinto De' Sivo". Nuova Rivista Storica (in Italian). 100 (1): 107–140. doi:10.1400/239822. ISSN 0029-6236.
- Peruzzi, Alberto (2018). "Il Risorgimento fra sette e complotti: il giudizio di Giacinto de' Sivo sulla spedizione dei Mille". In Benedetta Baldi (ed.). Complotti e Raggiri: Verità, non Verità, Verità Nascoste (in Italian). Rome: Viella. pp. 113–124. doi:10.23744/2407.
- Sarlin, Simon (2022). "Frères contre la révolution: discours et expériences de la fraternité dans l'Anti-Risorgimento". Frères de sang, frères d'armes, frères ennemis. La fraternité en Italie (1820–1924) (in French). Publications de l’École française de Rome: 183–197.
