= Agostino Falivene =

Roman Catholic bishop

- Bishop of Ischia
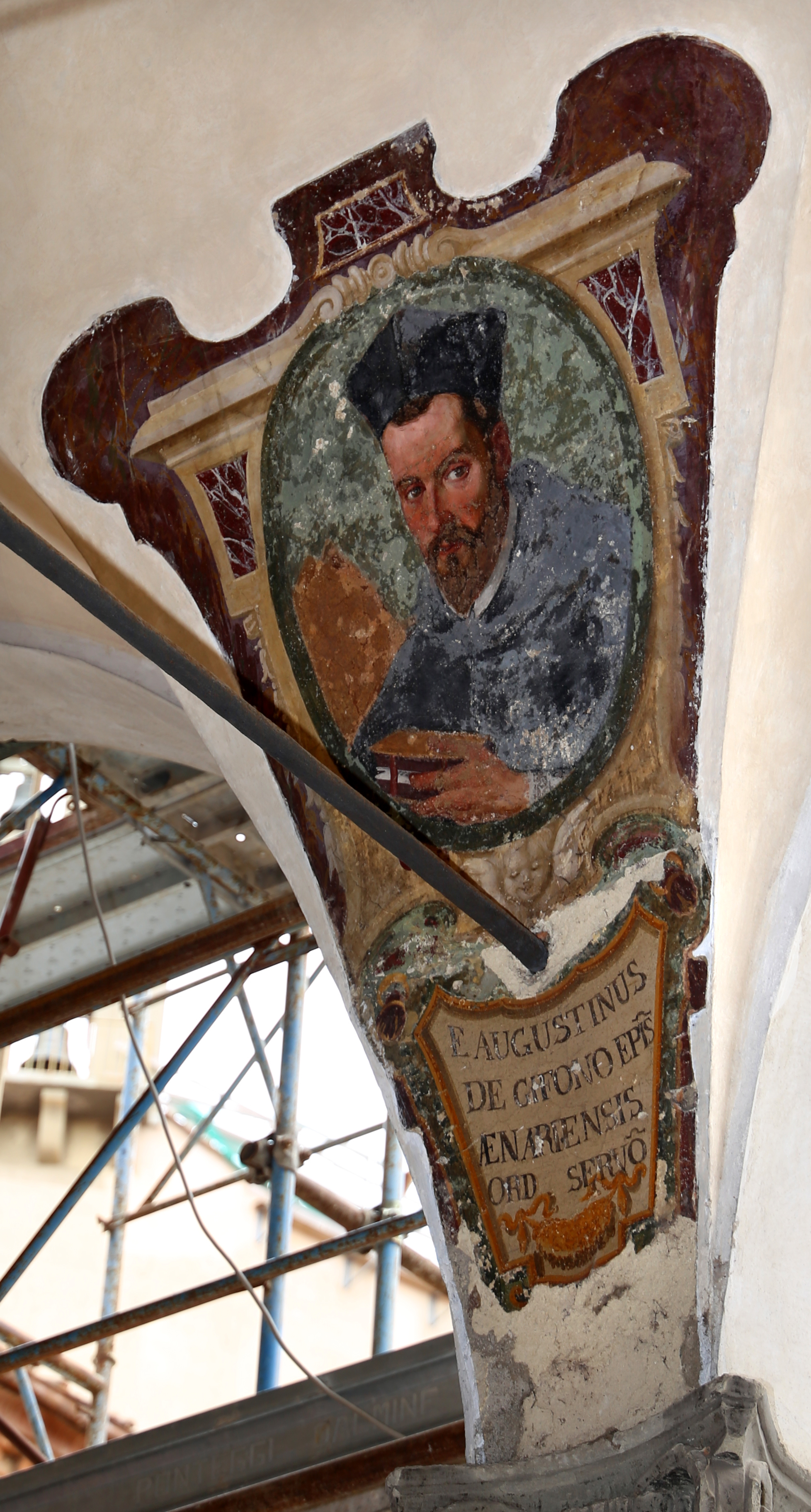
- Church: Roman Catholic Church
- Predecessor: Donato Strineo
- Successor: Francisco Gutierrez
- Previous post(s): Bishop of Capri

Personal details
- Born: Giffoni Valle Piana, Italia
- Died: 1548; Ischia, Italia

Agostino Falivene was born at Giffoni Valle Piana in the province of Salerno. Falivene was a member of the Order of the Servants of Maria, and a Roman Catholic bishop of the island of Capri from 25 September 1528 to 24 April 1534. Pope Paul III transferred him to the island of Ischia where he died in 1548. His tomb is in the castle of Ischia.
