= Montefalcione =

- Comune
- Comune di Montefalcione
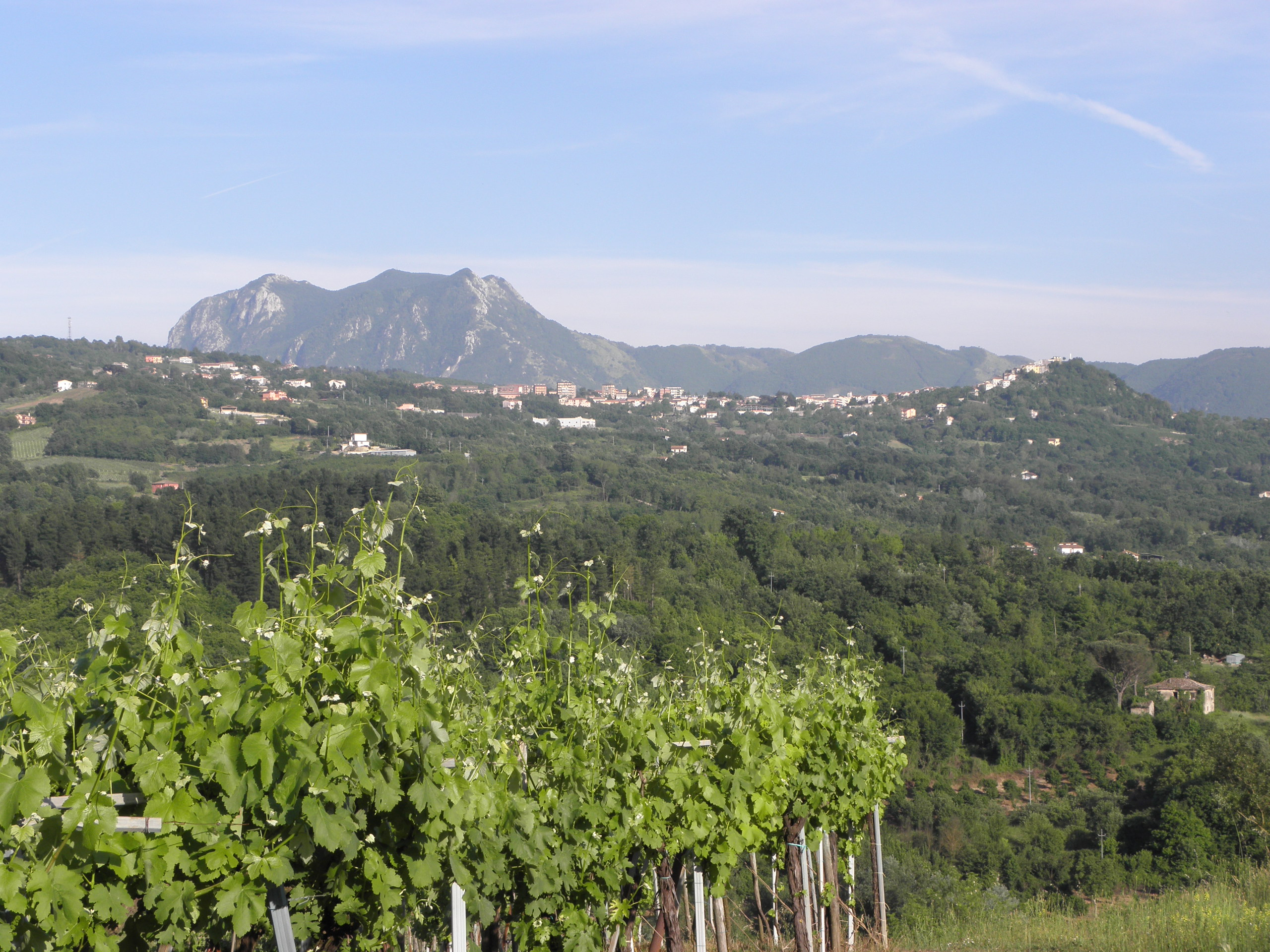
- Montefalcione

- Coat of arms

- Location within Italy Location within Campania
- Coordinates: 40°57′45″N 14°53′5″E
- Country: Italy
- Region: Campania
- Province: Avellino (AV)

Government
  - Mayor: Angelo Antonio D'Agostino (centre)

Area
  - Total: 15.15 km^{2} (5.85 sq mi)
- Elevation: 523 m (1,716 ft)

Population (31 December 2010)
  - Total: 3,461
  - Density: 228.4/km^{2} (591.7/sq mi)
- Demonym: Montefalcionesi
- Time zone: UTC+1 (CET)
  - Summer (DST): UTC+2 (CEST)
- Postal code: 83030
- Dialing code: 0825
- Patron saint: St. Anthony of Padua
- Saint day: 13 June
- Website: Official website

Montefalcione (Irpino: Mundëfaucionë) is a town and comune of the province of Avellino in the Campania region of southern Italy. The town lies on a hill which at its summit is 523 metres (1,716 ft) above sea level.

In 1861 it was the location of a revolt against the newly formed government of Italy.

== People ==
- Nicola Mancino

== See also ==
- Revolt of Montefalcione
