= Monte Litto =

Mountain in Italy

Coordinates: 40°56′37″N 14°40′08″E

Highest point
- Elevation: 700 m (2,300 ft)

Geography
- Location: Campania, Italy

Monte Litto is a mountain of Campania, Italy. It is 700 metres above sea level.
