= Pizzo San Michele =

Mountain in Italy

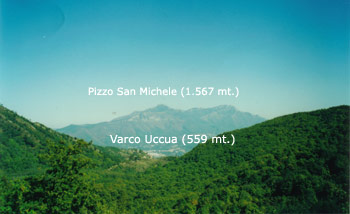

Highest point
- Elevation: 1,567 m (5,141 ft)
- Coordinates: 40°47′58″N 14°50′39″E

Geography
- Location within Italy
- Location: Campania, Italy
- Parent range: Apennines

Pizzo San Michele is a mountain of Campania, Italy. Its elevation is about 1,567 meters, and has been a popular destination for hiking for over a century.
