= Monte Costa Calda =

Mountain in Italy

- Location within Italy

Highest point
- Elevation: 1,166 m (3,825 ft)
- Coordinates: 40°24′49″N 15°02′07″E

Geography
- Location: Campania, Italy

Monte Costa Calda is a mountain in the region of Campania, Italy. Close to the shore, it is rated as an "E" for an easy climb.

== See also ==
- Conservation in Italy
