= Torre Le Nocelle =

- Comune
- Comune di Torre Le Nocelle
- Location within Italy Location within Campania
- Coordinates: 41°01′N 14°54′E
- Country: Italy
- Region: Campania
- Province: Avellino (AV)
- Frazioni: Taurasi, Mirabella Eclano, Montemiletto, Pietradefusi, Venticano

Government
  - Mayor: Antonio Cardillo (since May 2013)

Area
  - Total: 10.04 km^{2} (3.88 sq mi)
- Elevation: 420 m (1,380 ft)

Population (2024)
  - Total: 1,234
  - Density: 122.9/km^{2} (318.3/sq mi)
- Demonym: Torresi
- Time zone: UTC+1 (CET)
  - Summer (DST): UTC+2 (CEST)
- Postal code: 83030
- Dialing code: 0825
- Patron saint: San Ciriaco
- Saint day: March 16 and August 8

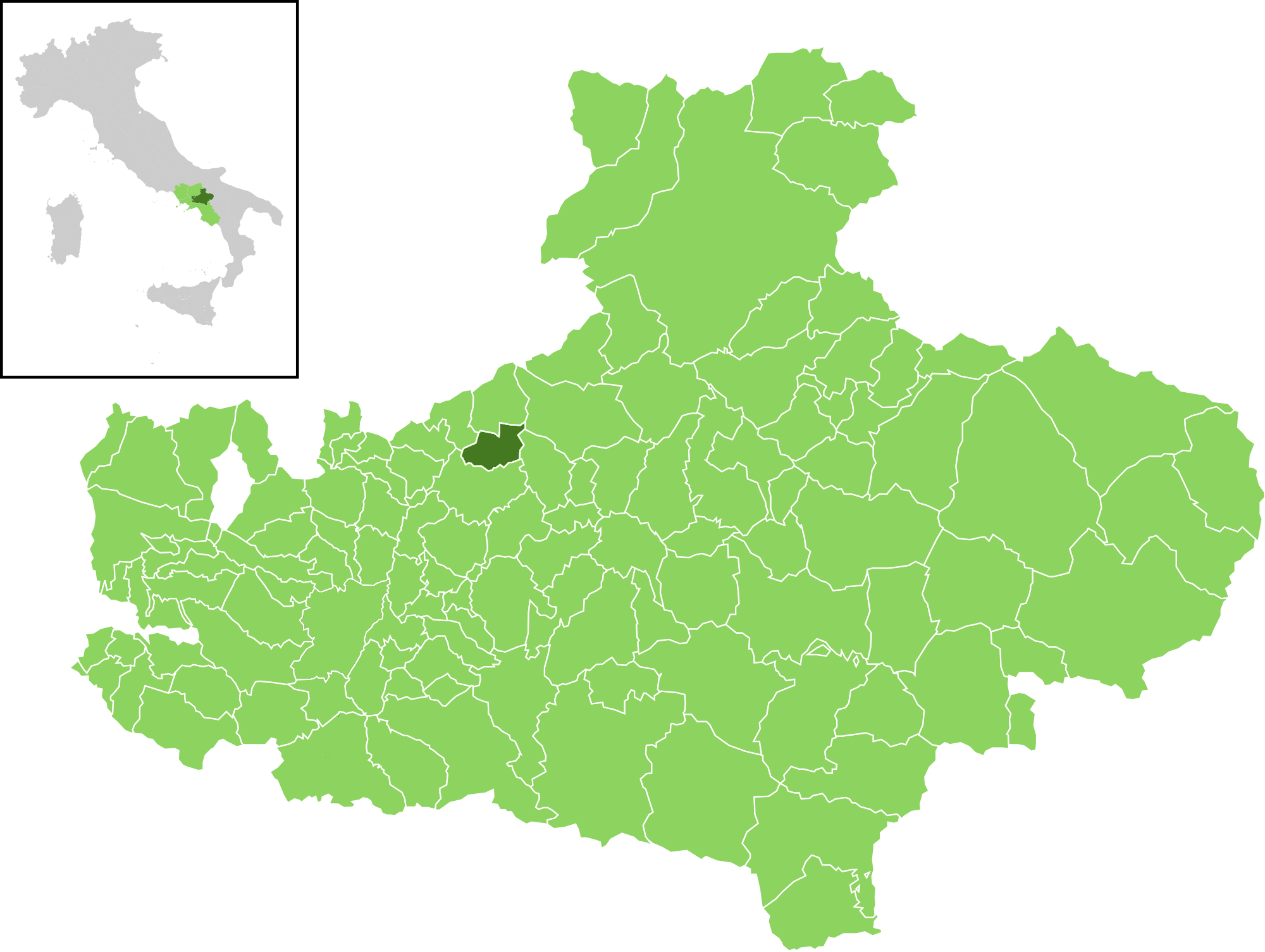
Position of the municipality within the province of Avellino

Torre Le Nocelle is a town and comune in the province of Avellino, Campania, Italy.
