= Tammaro =

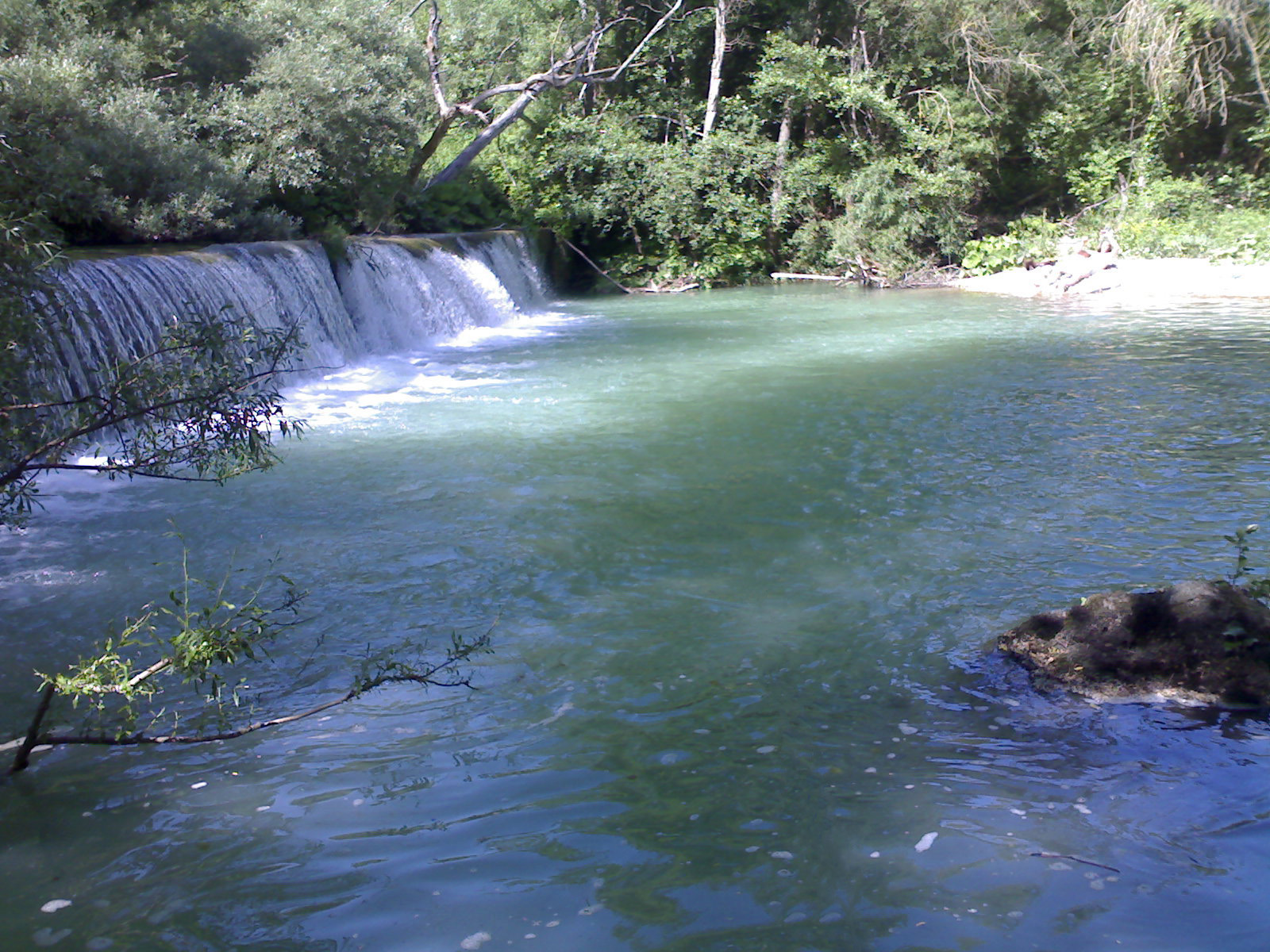

Location
- Country: Molise and Campania, southern Italy

Physical characteristics
- Source
  - location: Sella di Vinchiaturo
  - elevation: 558 m (1,831 ft)
- Mouth: Calore Irpino
  - coordinates: 41.1466°N 14.8320°E
- Length: 78 km (48 mi)
- Basin size: 793 km^{2} (306 sq mi)

Basin features
- Progression: Calore Irpino→ Volturno→ Tyrrhenian Sea

The Tammaro (Tàmmaro) is a river in southwestern Italy, with a length of 78 kilometres (48 mi) and a catchment area of 673 square kilometres (260 mi^{2}). It rises in the Sella del Vinchiaturo in the Apennine Mountains and is a tributary of the Calore Irpino river. In ancient times it was known by the Latin name Tamarus.
