= Monte Iulio =

Mountain in Italy

- Location within Italy

Highest point
- Elevation: 623 m (2,044 ft)
- Coordinates: 40°47′56″N 14°43′03″E

Geography
- Location: Campania, Italy

Monte Iulio (or Monte Giulio) is a mountain of Campania, Italy. It is 623 meter high mountain located between the municipalities of Siano and Campomanfoli, an ancient farmhouse in Castel San Giorgio, in the province of Salerno.

From records of various archives it appears that even in 1700 it was called in this way. It is also called Poggio Coviglia.

According to tradition the name derives from Julius Cesar who assigned the mountain to the legionaries of the Roman colony, to use it mainly as a source of wood supply. A street in Castel San Giorgio is still today called Via degli Iuliani because it was used by the Julius' legionaries to go to the territory of the colony.

By virtue of its privileged exposure at noon, the mountain slopes are populated by small, typically family-owned agricultural plots. Among the cultivated vegetables there are fennel, cauliflower, broccoli, tomatoes, artichokes, endive, peppers, beans, aubergines, lettuce, potatoes, onions and garlic.
