= Molar =

Molar may refer to:

- Molar (tooth), a kind of tooth found in mammals
- Molar (grape), another name for the Spanish wine grape Listan Negro
- Molar (unit), a unit of concentration equal to 1 mole per litre
- Molar quantities, such as molar mass, molar volume, etc.
- El Molar, Tarragona, a village in the comarca (county) of Priorat, province of Tarragona in the autonomous region of Catalonia, Spain
- El Molar, Madrid, a town in the north of the Community of Madrid in the road to Burgos, after San Agustín de Guadalix

== See also ==
- Moler, a power-pop band from Australia
- Moler (surname)
- Molaro (disambiguation)
- Molar tooth sign, a characteristic of the genetic disorder Joubert syndrome
