= Vesole =

Mountain in Italy

Coordinates: 40°24′25″N 15°09′24″E

Highest point
- Elevation: 1,210 m (3,970 ft)

Geography
- Location: Campania, Italy

Vesole is a mountain of Campania, Italy. It has an elevation of 1,210 metres above sea level. The local Campanians pick variety of plants on the mountain for food, medicine, and other purposes.
