= Calore Irpino =

Calore
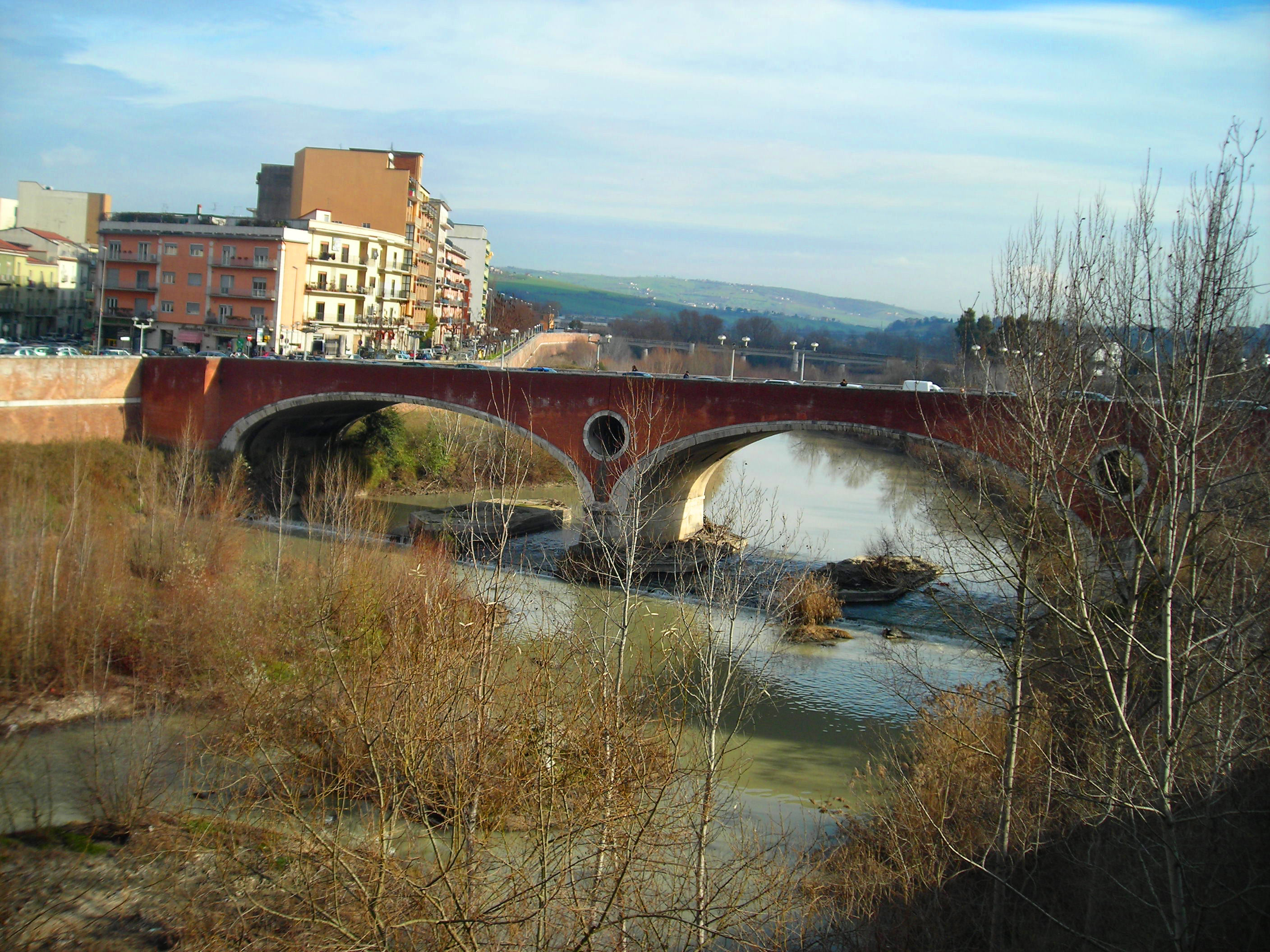
- The Calore at Benevento

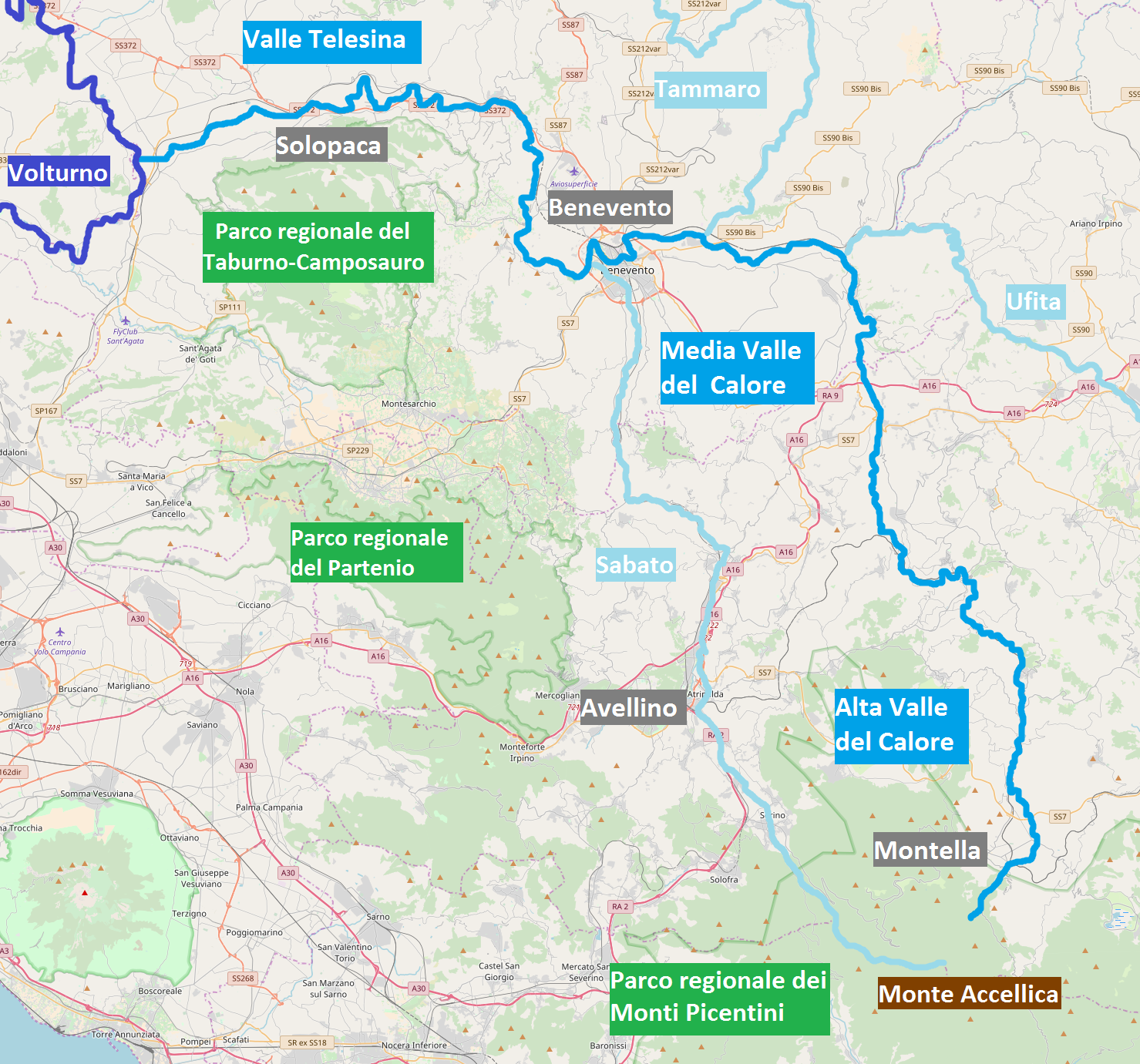
- Map of the Calore River and its three main tributaries

Location
- Country: Italy

Physical characteristics
- Source
  - location: Monte Cervialto, Monti Picentini
  - elevation: 1,809 m (5,935 ft)
- Mouth: Volturno
  - coordinates: 41°11′06″N 14°27′46″E
- Length: 108 km (67 mi)
- Basin size: 3,085 square kilometres (1,191 mi^{2})
- Discharge
  - average: 31.8 m^{3}/s (1,120 cu ft/s)

Basin features
- Progression: Volturno→ Tyrrhenian Sea
- Tributaries
  - left: Sabato
  - right: Ufita, Tammaro

The Calore Irpino or Calore Beneventano or Calore river is a river in southwestern Italy. It rises from Colle Finestra (1,060 metres (3,480 ft) above sea level), a mountain saddle between Monte Acellica and the Terminio sub-group in the Monti Picentini, sub-range of the Apennine Mountains. The river flows first in the province of Avellino, and then in that of Benevento, before flowing into the Volturno. In ancient times it was known as Calor.

== Overview ==
On 8 May 663, a large detachment of the army of the Eastern Emperor Constans II, which had invaded the Lombard Duchy of Benevento, was defeated here in battle by the army of King Grimoald, under the joint command of Mitola, Count of Capua, and Grimoald's son, Romuald.

Having already abandoned the siege of Benevento and every small conquest done in Italy, Constans, falling back to Naples, lost any hope to push back the Lombards and re-establish Byzantine sovereignty over southern Italy.

== Sources ==
- Iamalio, Antonio (1918). la Regina del Sannio. Naples: P. Federico & G. Ardia.
