= Calvanico =

- Comune
- Comune di Calvanico
- Location within Italy Location within Campania
- Coordinates: 40°47′N 14°50′E
- Country: Italy
- Region: Campania
- Province: Salerno (SA)

Government
  - Mayor: Antonio Conforti

Area
  - Total: 14.91 km^{2} (5.76 sq mi)
- Elevation: 600 m (2,000 ft)

Population (28 February 2017)
  - Total: 1,492
  - Density: 100.1/km^{2} (259.2/sq mi)
- Demonym(s): Calvagnoli, Calvanesi
- Time zone: UTC+1 (CET)
  - Summer (DST): UTC+2 (CEST)
- Postal code: 84080
- Dialing code: 089
- ISTAT code: 065020
- Patron saint: St. Michael Archangel
- Saint day: 29 September
- Website: Official website

Calvanico (Neapolitan: Cravanic) is a town and comune in the province of Salerno in the Campania region of south-western Italy.
