= Sabato (river) =

River in Italy

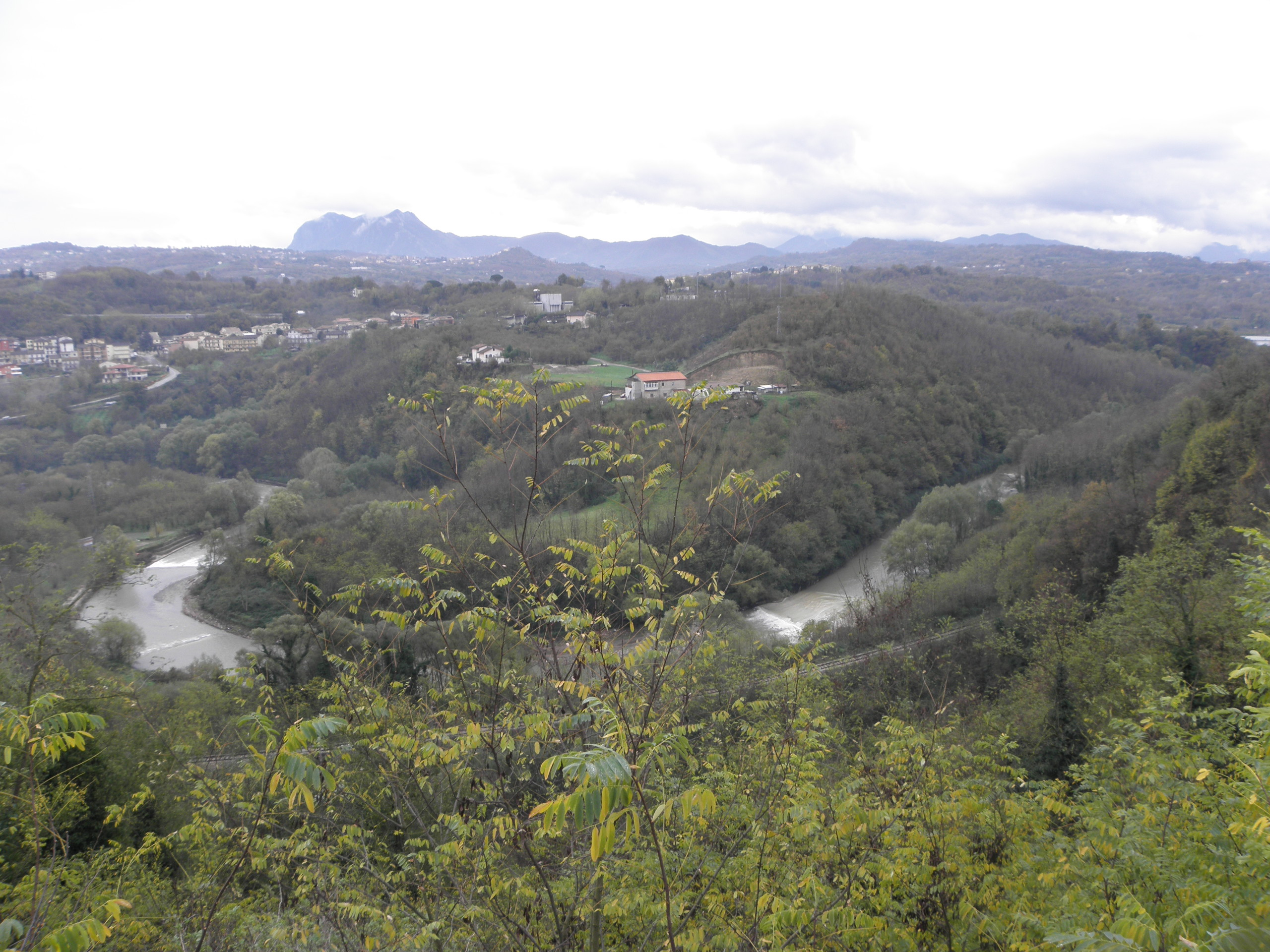

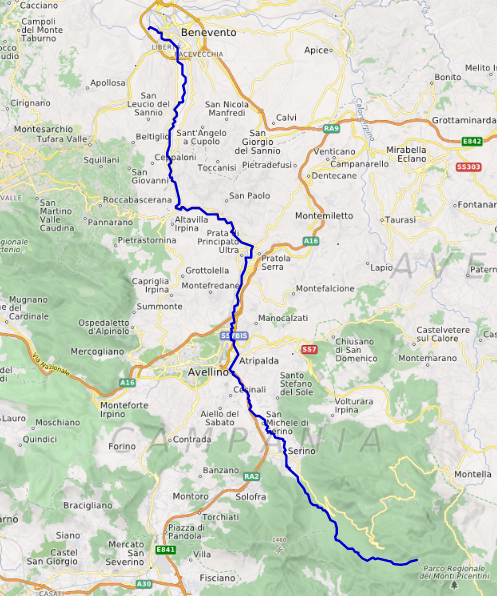
- Course of the Sabato

Location
- Country: Italy

Physical characteristics
- Mouth: Calore Irpino
  - coordinates: 41.1336°N 14.7584°E
- Basin size: 459 km^{2} (177 sq mi)

Basin features
- Progression: Calore Irpino→ Volturno→ Tyrrhenian Sea

The Sabato (Fiume Sabato) is a river in southern Italy. It is a tributary of the Calore Irpino (Calore Beneventano) and joins it at Benevento. It has a catchment basin of 459 square kilometres (177 sq mi).
