= San Cipriano Picentino =

- Comune
- Comune di San Cipriano Picentino
- Coat of arms

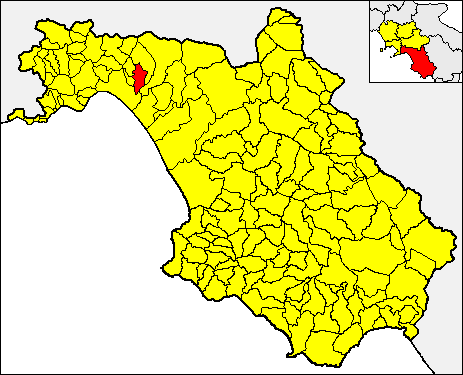
- San Cipriano Picentino within the Province of Salerno

- Location within Italy Location within Campania
- Coordinates: 40°43′N 14°52′E
- Country: Italy
- Region: Campania
- Province: Salerno (SA)
- Frazioni: Filetta, Campigliano, Pezzano, Vignale

Government
  - Mayor: Sonia Alfano

Area
  - Total: 17 km^{2} (6.6 sq mi)

Population (31 August 2015)
  - Total: 6,628
  - Density: 390/km^{2} (1,000/sq mi)
- Demonym: Sanciprianesi
- Time zone: UTC+1 (CET)
  - Summer (DST): UTC+2 (CEST)
- Postal code: 84099
- Dialing code: 089
- Patron saint: St. Cyprian
- Website: Official website

San Cipriano Picentino is a town and comune in the Province of Salerno in the Campania region of southern Italy.

== Twin towns ==
- Sormano (Italy, since 2007)
