= Monti Picentini =

Mountain range in Italy

Coordinates: 40°45′N 15°00′E

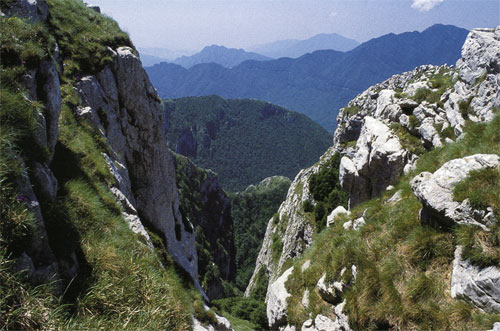
Rocky limestone landscape in the monti Picentini.

The Monti Picentini is a mountain range and national park in southern Italy, part of the Apennines, traditionally part in the Campanian Apennines. They are included between the Monti Lattari, the Partenio mount, the Irpinian plateau and the Sele river valley. The chain is included in the Monti Picentini Regional Park.

The highest peak is the Monte Cervialto (1,809 m), in the eastern sector, followed by the Monte Terminio (1,783 m), which is instead in the western part of the range.

== Geology, landscape and climate ==
=== Overview ===
The range is mostly made up of carbonate rocks, such as dolomite and limestone rocks, different from the surroundings areas, which are dominated by sandstone rocks. A central depression, joining the valleys of the Calore Irpino and Tusciano rivers, divided the range in two geologically different sectors: the western one, where rocks are predominantly dolomite, and the eastern one, mostly made up of limestone and has generally a less sharp landscape.

Karst topography is widely present, from which, in the valleys below, originates several springs.

Snow is present in winter over 1,000 m of altitude.

Vegetation is generally low, somewhere mixed with chestnut woods.

=== Rivers ===
Rivers starting from the Monti Picentini include:

- Sele
- Tusciano
- Picentino
- Calore Irpino
- Sabato
- Ofanto

== See also ==
- Monte Acellica
- Monti Picentini Regional Park
