= Camillo Caracciolo, 2nd Prince of Avellino =

Camillo Caracciolo
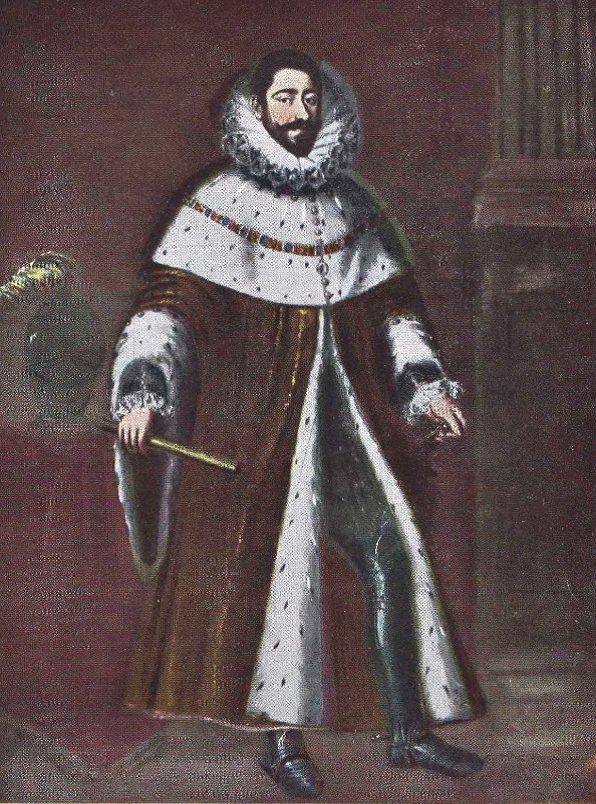
- Succeeded by: Marino II Caracciolo

Personal details
- Spouse: Roberta Carafa
- Children: Marino II Caracciolo
- Parents: Marino I Caracciolo (father); Crisostoma Carafa (mother)
- Awards: Order of the Golden Fleece

Camillo Caracciolo (September 11, 1563, Naples – December 28, 1630, Caravaggio), 2nd Prince of Avellino, 3rd Duke of Atripalda and 3rd Count of Torella, was a military leader and statesman of the Kingdom of Naples and the Spanish Empire.

Camillo was born as the second son of Marino I Caracciolo, 1st Prince of Avellino, and Crisostoma Carafa. He initially intended to pursue a clerical career, but after the death of his elder brother in 1585 he became heir to the titles of his father, receiving the title of Count of Torella. Neapolitan patrician, Scipione Bellabona Marquis di Bella (1603) describes him as "one of the most handsome princes of his time, tall, pleasant in appearance, and with an open manner and lively spirit that endeared him to others." Following his father's example, Camillo pursued a military career in the service of the King of Spain, serving under Alessandro Farnese in various campaigns. After showing valor on a number of occasions Farnese promoted Camillo to the general of the Neapolitan heavy cavalry (cataphracts). He participated in the Siege of Antwerp (1584-1585) under Alessandro Farnese's command. In June of 1592 he became the military adviser in the Spanish Netherlands, and was appointed as a member of the Collateral Council of the Kingdom of Naples in 1597. He gathered and commanded Tercio units in Naples, setting out for the war in Flanders. He promoted personally Tommaso Caracciolo to captain. He would take part in the Flanders campaign, in particular the Siege of Ostend, where his tercios bore the brunt of trench warfare. As a reward for his bravery at the siege of Ostend Camillo was knighted by Philip III in the Order of the Golden Fleece in 1602. He received the chain of the order from the Duke of Parma in the cathedral of his capital on October 13 of the same year.

On February 11, 1609, he assumed the post of Grand Chancellor of the Kingdom of Naples, a prestigious position that included jurisdiction over the University of Naples and the authority of president of the College of Doctors, which awarded degrees in law, medicine, and theology.

On August 9, 1609 he was appointed governor of Calabria.

The prince's wealth also grew, and he was able to purchase the estate of Sanseverino, which included 43 farms, including Baronissi and Lancusi, for 134,000 ducats. In Avellino, he improved the wool industry, using the water resources of Irpinia, for which he received the nickname "prince of the waters" ( il principe delle acque ).

The prince fought against usury and was involved in charity, using his wife's dowry to create the Monte di Pieta, a charity fund, also called the Monte di maritaggio (marriage fund), because it provided orphan girls with an allowance of 50 scudi. With papal blessing, Camillo founded the Conservatory of the Sisters, where nuns were responsible for the education of girls from good families. He was active in civil and religious construction, and completed the restoration of the Church of St. John the Baptist, better known as Monserrato, built by Countess Maria de Cardona.

A lover of art and literature, the Prince of Avellino was a member of the Neapolitan Accademia degli Oziosi, founded by Giovanni Battista Manso on May 3, 1611, in the monastery of Santa Maria delle Grazie. He decorated the walls of his Neapolitan residence with canvases by the best painters of the time. Avellino Castle transformed into a luxurious residence in the Renaissance style, was adorned with a magnificent park on Belvedere Hill, where fountains were installed, and aqueducts were built to supply water.

He returned to arms against the Venetians and against the Duke of Savoy in the war for the succession to the duchy of Mantua. While serving in Lombardy, Camillo became a general of cavalry of the Duchy of Milan (1617). Praised as "the ornament and glory of the present and future of his family.", He died suddenly in the Caravaggio castle, and was buried in the church of Santa Maria del Carmine, which he began to build in 1604.

== Literature ==
- Maurice, Jean-Baptiste. Le blason des armoiries de tous les chevaliers de l'ordre de la Toison d'Or depuis la première institution jusques à present. - La Haye; Brussels; Anvers: Jean Rammazeyn; Lucas de Potter, 1667, p. 340 [1]
- Pinedo y Salazar J. de. Historia de la Insigne Orden del Toisón de Oro. TI - Madrid: Imprenta Real, 1787, p. 289
