= Sava, Baronissi =

Sava
- Frazione
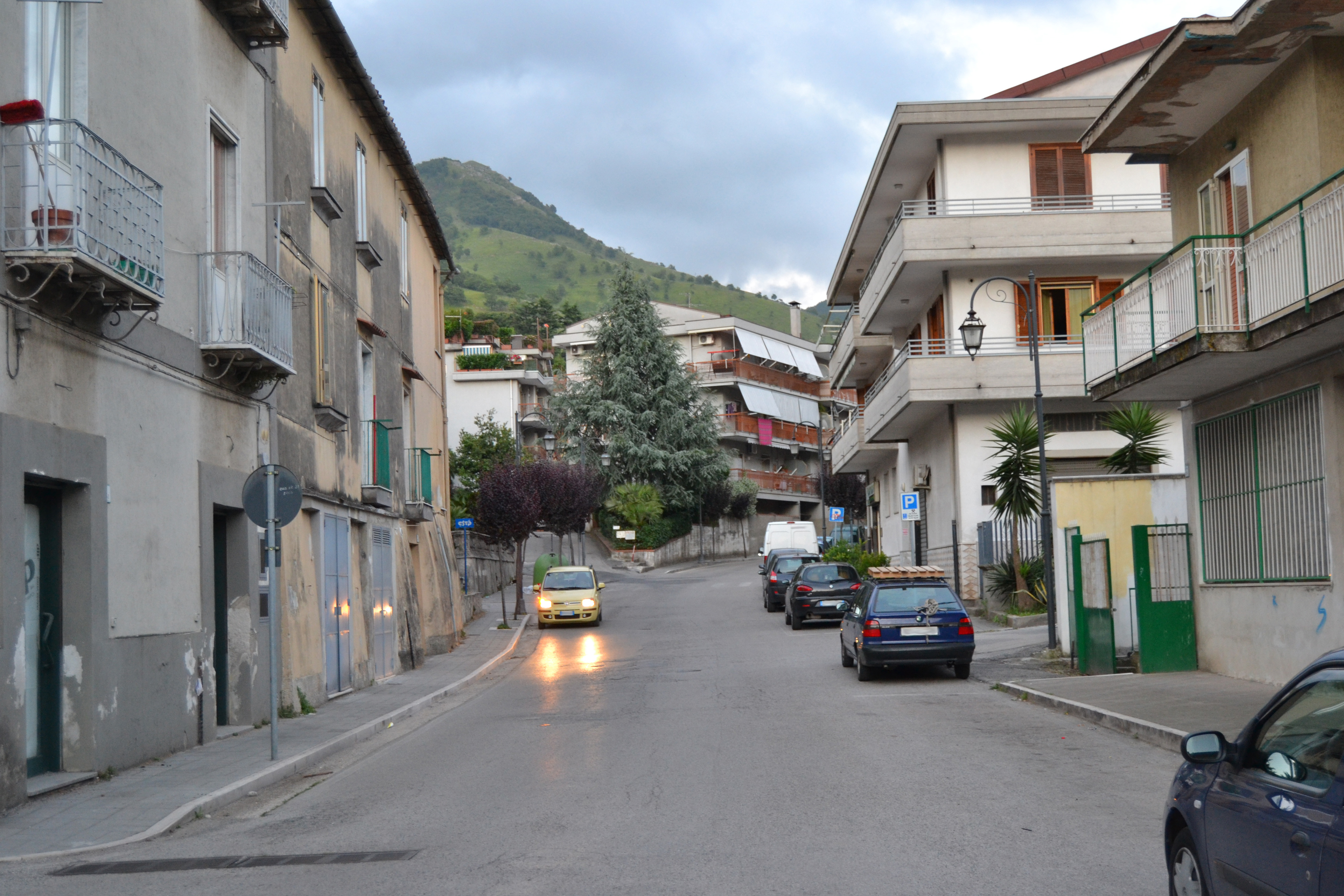
- A road in town's centre

- Location of Sava in Italy
- Coordinates: 40°44′50.4″N 14°46′50.2″E
- Country: Italy
- Region: Campania
- Province: Salerno (SA)
- Comune: Baronissi
- Elevation: 261 m (856 ft)

Population (2009)
  - Total: 4,153
- Demonym: Savesi
- Time zone: UTC+1 (CET)
  - Summer (DST): UTC+2 (CEST)
- Postal code: 84081
- Dialing code: (+39) 089
- Patron saint: St. Agnes
- Saint day: 21 January

Sava is a southern Italian village and hamlet (frazione) of Baronissi, a municipality in the province of Salerno, Campania. With a population of 4,153 (2009), it is the most populated hamlet of its municipality.

== History ==
Original settlement of a Roman villa of the 1st century AD, Sava grew around its historic center, named Vallone. It was first mentioned in 1011, with the ancient name of Sabba.

== Geography ==
Sava spans on a plain, named Irno Valley, west of the Picentini mountain range, at the springs of Irno river. The village is urbanistically contiguous with Baronissi, and other nearest settlements are Caprecano, Orignano, Lancusi, Antessano, Acquamela, Bolano, Fusara and Penta.

Part of the urban area of Salerno (8 km far), it is 4 km from Fisciano, 6 from Mercato San Severino and 27 from Avellino. Its northern suburb hosts an industrial area and the faculty of medicine of the University of Salerno.

== Transport ==
The village is crossed from east by the RA 2 motorway Salerno-Avellino, and is served by the exit "Lancusi-Baronissi Nord". Nearest railway station, Baronissi, part of Salerno-Mercato San Severino line, is located on the border with Baronissi, 500 m from the center.

== Multipurpose center ==
Located in Via Pozzillo, it was inaugurated in 2004 as "Casa della Musica" (House of the Music) and was named after Francesco Giordano, a young Baronissi musician who died of leukemia the year before. The house of music was then closed and renovated and then reopened in January 2020 as a multifunctional center. The local Senegalese community and various local and not for profit associations participated in the second inauguration ceremony, under the same organization that every year takes care of the local comic book fair, Irno Comix & Games.

== Gallery ==
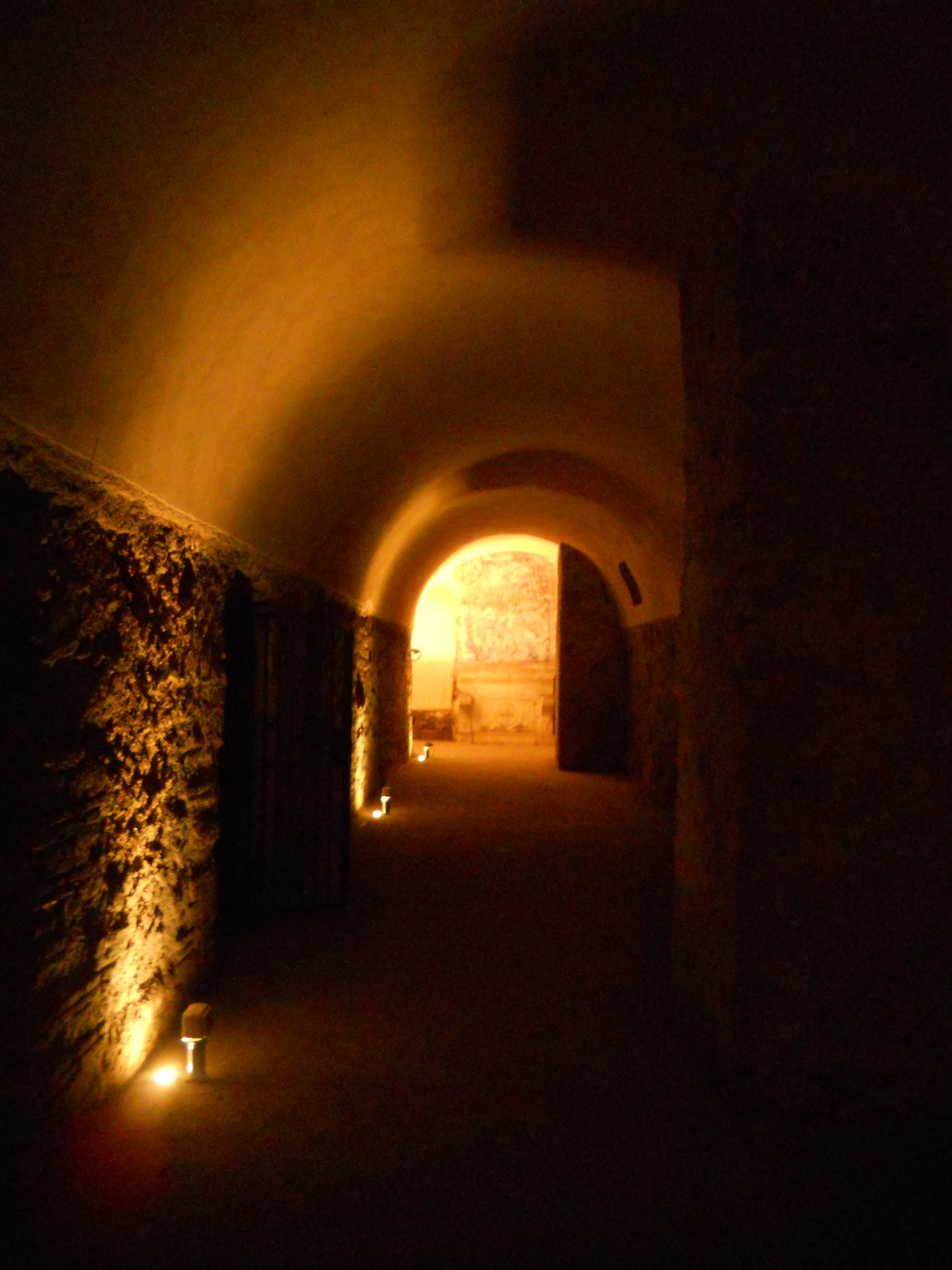
Cryptoporticus of the Roman villa

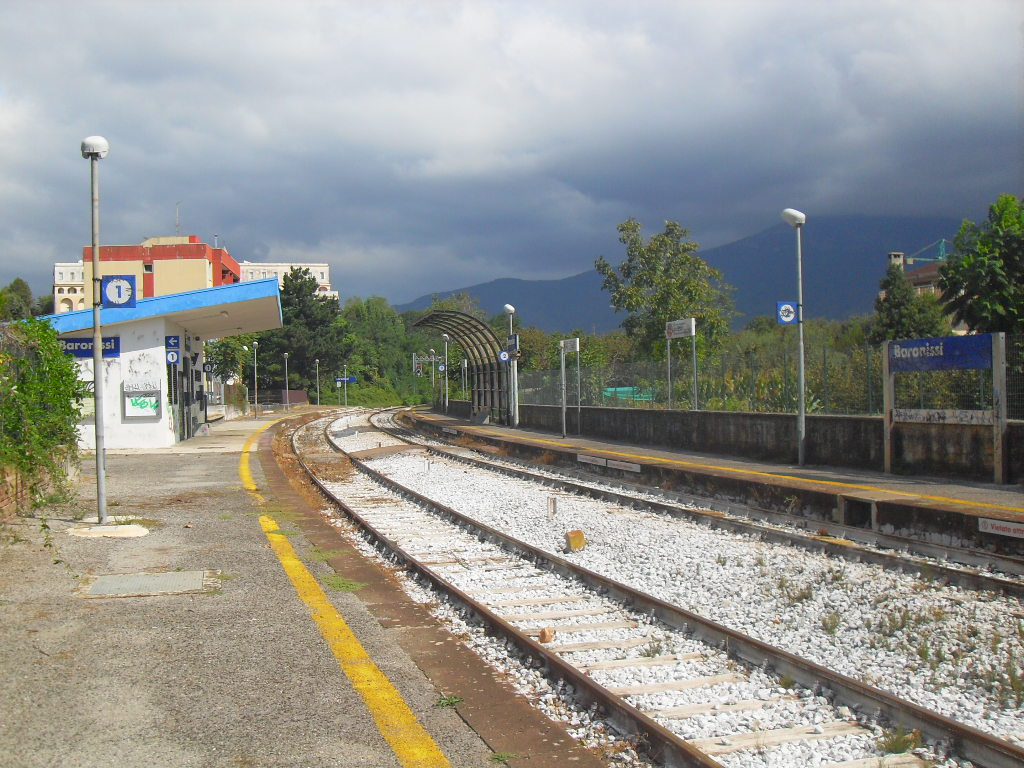
Baronissi station, located next to Sava
