= Michele Ricciardi =

Italian painter

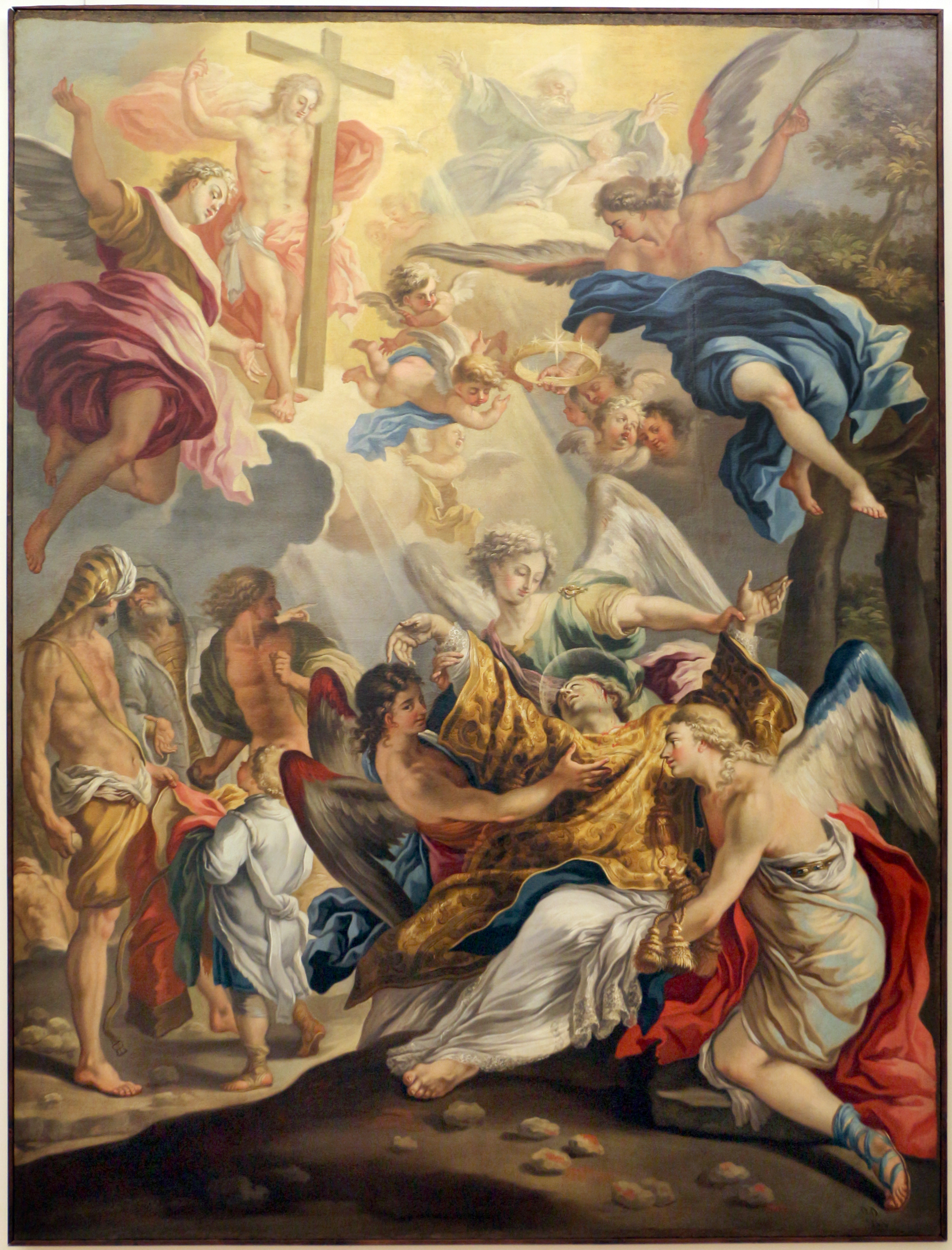
Stoning of Saint Stephen, Sant'Angelo Le Fratte

Michele Ricciardi (1672 – 1753) was an Italian painter, active in the provinces of Salerno and Avellino, and other towns in the Campania all within the Kingdom of Naples in a late-Baroque-style.

== Biography ==
He was born and died in Penta, a neighborhood of Fisciano in the province of Salerno. He is described as a follower of Luca Giordano and Francesco Solimena. He mainly painted sacred subjects for churches. He frescoed the interior of the church of Santa Maria delli Mazzi in Coperchia. He depicted the Assumption and the Coronation of the Virgin. He also painted the Virgin with St Lucy and Catherine of Alexandria intercedes with Christ for the town of Coperchia and an Allegory of the Catholic Church. Around this painting, are twelve smaller paintings likely depicting allegories of the three theological virtues (Faith, Hope and Charity); the four cardinal virtues (Strength, Justice, Temperance, and Prudence); and the eight Beatitudes. He also painted for the Avellino Cathedral.
