= Lancusi =

- Frazione
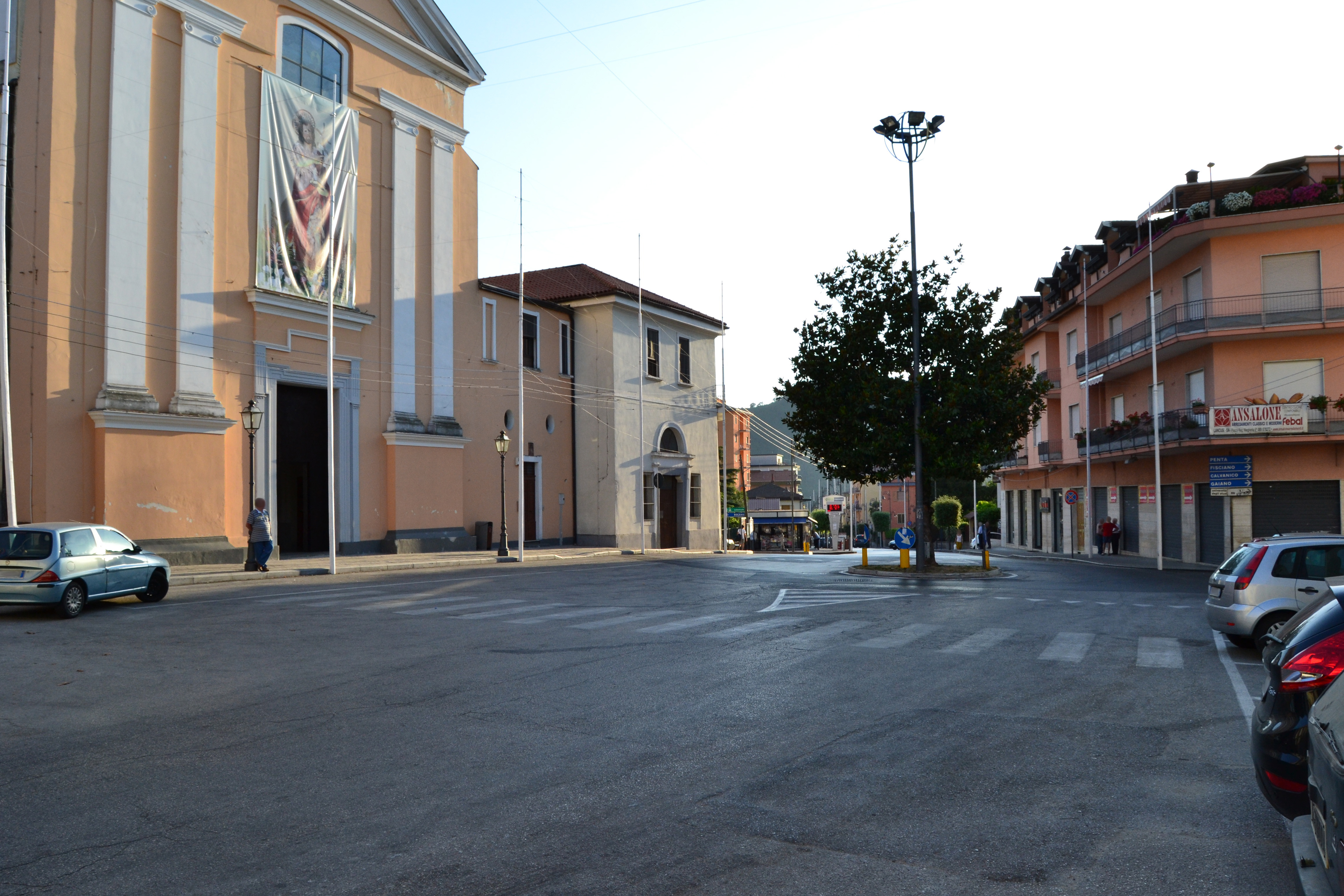
- The central Regina Margherita Square with St. Martin's Church

- Location of Lancusi in Italy
- Coordinates: 40°45′43.1″N 14°47′06.4″E
- Country: Italy
- Region: Campania
- Province: Salerno (SA)
- Comune: Fisciano
- Elevation: 232 m (761 ft)

Population (2011)
  - Total: 4,000 (circa)
- Demonym: Lancusani
- Time zone: UTC+1 (CET)
  - Summer (DST): UTC+2 (CEST)
- Postal code: 84084
- Dialing code: (+39) 089
- Patron saint: St. John the Baptist
- Saint day: Last sunday of June

Lancusi is a southern Italian village and hamlet (frazione) of Fisciano, a municipality in the province of Salerno, Campania. With a population of circa 4,000 (2011), it is the most populated settlement of its municipality, including the administrative town.

== History ==
First mentioned in 1309 with the name of Lanciusi, the village was an independent barony of the Principality of Sanseverino.

== Geography ==
Lancusi spans on a plain, named Irno Valley, west of the Picentini mountain range, near the springs of Irno river. The village is urbanistically contiguous, almost fused, with the village of Bolano. Other nearby settlements are Baronissi, Penta, Sava and Orignano. It spans on two parallel main roads: Via Tenente Nastri, representing the old town center, and Via del Centenario, the northern urban expansion. North of it is the locality of Macchione.

Part of the urban area of Salerno (11 km far), it is 2 km from Corticelle, 4 from Fisciano and the University of Salerno, 4.5 from Mercato San Severino and Gaiano, 6 from Calvanico and 30 from Avellino. The faculty of medicine of the university, located in the suburbs of Sava, lies just outside Bolano.

== Transport ==
The village is crossed by the RA 2 motorway Salerno-Avellino, and is served by the exit "Lancusi-Baronissi Nord". Fisciano railway station, part of Salerno-Mercato San Severino line, is located south of it, at the end of Via Nastri.

== Gallery ==
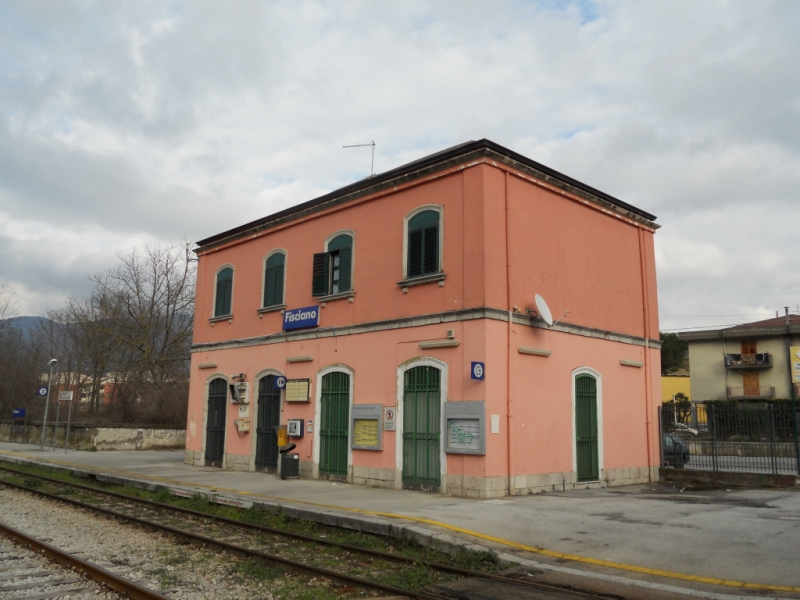
Fisciano station, located in Lancusi

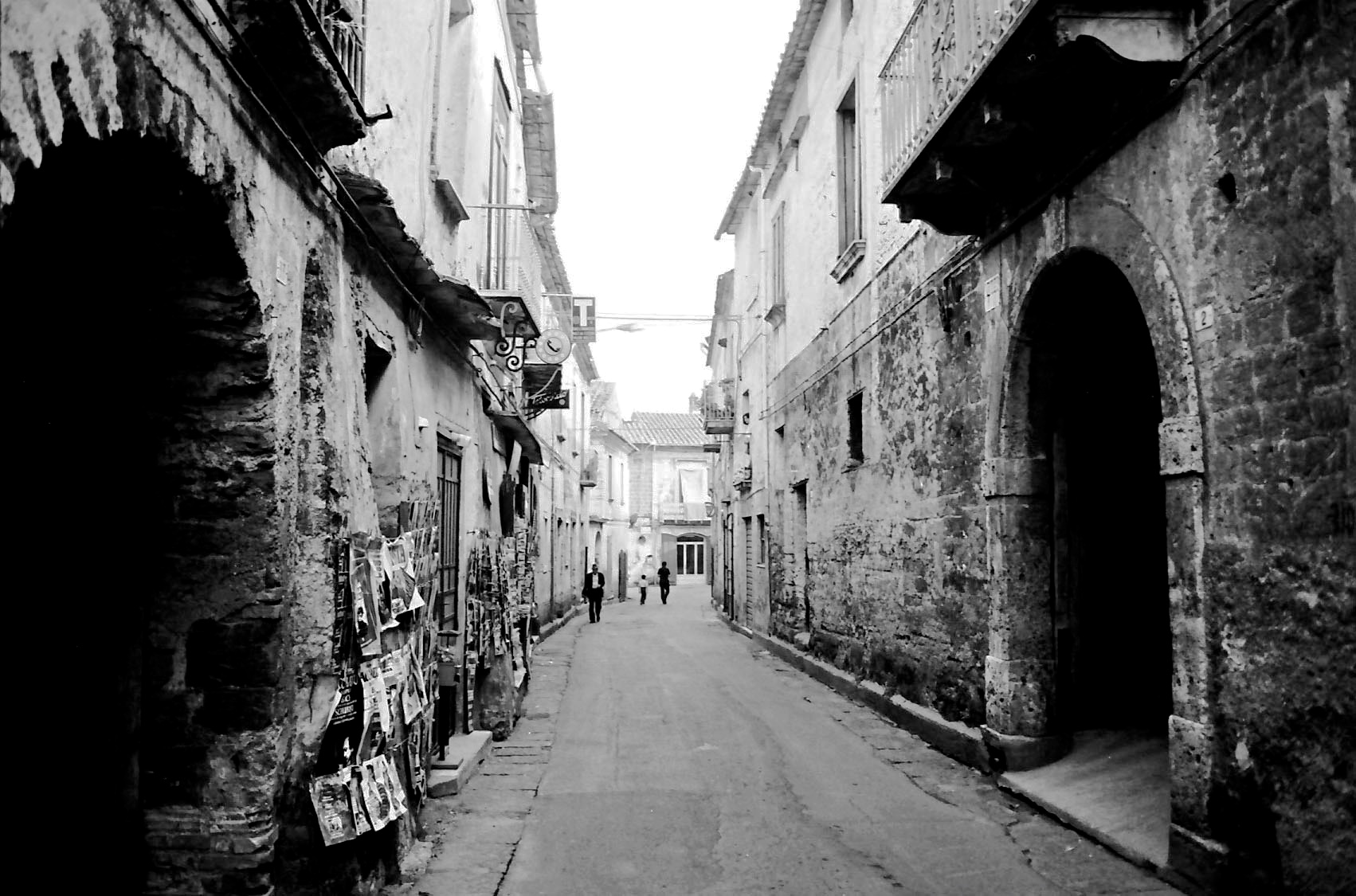
A road of Lancusi in 1980
