= Saint Flavian =

Saint Flavian may refer to:

- Flavian (died 259, one of the Martyrs of Carthage under Valerian
- Flavianus of Avellino (died 311), a priest from Antioch martyred with St Florentinus
- Flavian of Constantinople (died 449), patriarch
- Fravitta of Constantinople, better known as Fravitta (died 490), patriarch
- Flavianus Michael Malke (1858–1915), Syrian Catholic eparch of Cizre martyred during a Turkish massacre of Christians
