= Coperchia =

Coordinates: 40.7347°N 14.7500°E

Coperchia is the most populated parish of Pellezzano, in the Province of Salerno, Italy.

== Geography ==
It is located along the so-called Via dei casali, which is a county road that connects the city of Baronissi with Salerno, and it is also the location of the local cemetery. There's also a town library and a theatre, whose name's "M. A. Galdi".

== Transport ==
There's also a train station, which connects Coperchia with Salerno and also with other important centres of its province, such as Baronissi, Mercato San Severino and Nocera Inferiore. Salerno and Baronissi are also reachable by bus.

== Culture ==
Peppino De Filippo wrote a farce, whose name was A Coperchia è caduta una stella, which takes place in Coperchia. It was written in 1933. There's also a film which is inspired by this farce. Its name's "In campagna è caduta una stella", and it was directed in 1932 by Eduardo De Filippo, who was Peppino's brother.

== See also ==
- Capezzano
- Capriglia
- Irno
- Comunità Montana Zona Irno
