= Milly D'Abbraccio =

Italian politician

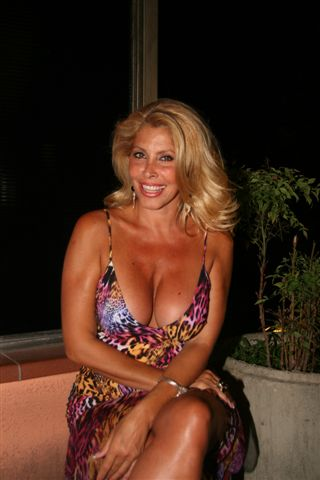
- Born: Emilia Cucciniello; November 3, 1964 (age 61); Avellino, Italy
- Occupations: Actress; pornographic actress
- Years active: 1993–2007

Milly D'Abbraccio (born 3 November 1964) is an Italian former actress and pornographic actress.

== Life and career ==
Born in Avellino, the sister of stage actress Mariangela D'Abbraccio, she started her career in 1978, winning the Miss Teenager Italy pageant, then she appeared in a number of films, stage plays and television shows as an actress and soubrette. In 1979, she published a song with the pseudonym of Milly Mou, "Superman Supergalattico".

In the late 1980s, she joined the agency Diva Futura and switched to porn. She was one of the first Italian actresses to star pregnant in a porn film.

In the Italian 2008 general election, she was a Socialist Party candidate for the municipality of Rome. In 2011, she announced her candidacy for mayor of the city of Monza with a local party, Forza Monza. She was not elected.

D'Abbraccio was a protagonist in gossip columns dealing with her affair with art critic and politician Vittorio Sgarbi.
