= Antonio Baccarini =

Italian merchant and chemist (1887–1971)

- Born: July 7, 1887
- Died: February 6, 1971 (aged 83)
- Citizenship: Australia
- Known for: public lecturer, community leader, merchant

Antonio Baccarini (7 July 1887 – 6 February 1971) was an Italian merchant and chemist, born in Avellino. Antonio later moved to Florence and became qualified in chemistry and science.

== Background and career ==
Antonio was born on 7 July 1887 to an Italian Catholic family. He served in the Italian army during World War I, where he was promoted to captain and awarded the British Military Cross. After marrying Ruth King in London and serving as a liaison officer, he settled in Sydney, Australia, in 1922, where he became a prominent businessman and cultural figure. Baccarini founded the Italian Chamber of Commerce in Australia, was involved in the Dante Alighieri Art and Literary Society, and contributed significantly to the Italian community through lectures and writings. Despite controversies over his support of Fascism.

Baccarini was a member of the Royal Society of New South Wales from 1923.

Baccarini died on 6 February 1971 in Balmain, Sydney, New South Wales, Australia.
