= Avellino Cathedral =

Cathedral in Avellino, Campania, Italy

Coordinates: 40.9153°N 14.7970°E

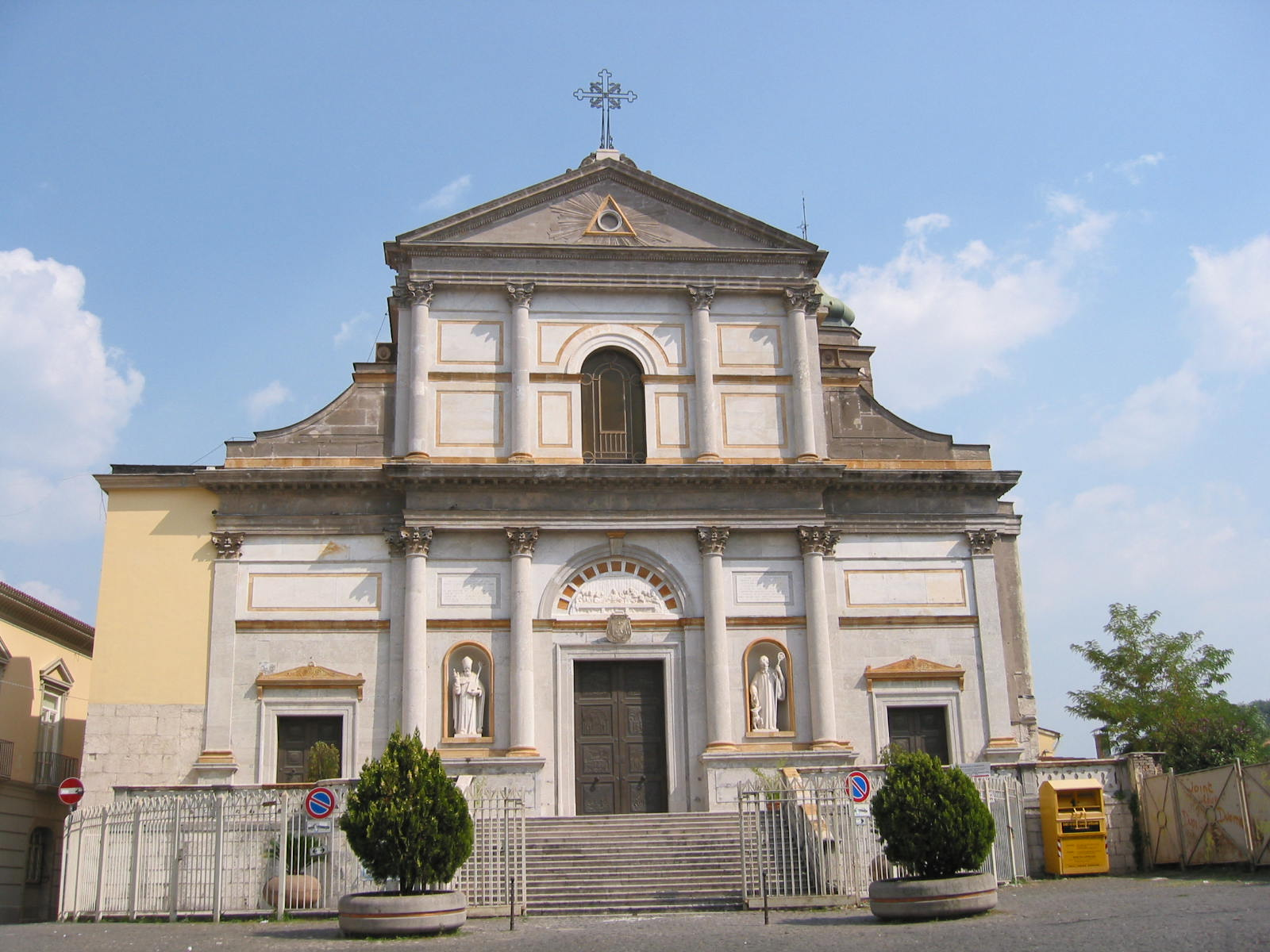
West front

Avellino Cathedral (Italian: Duomo di Santa Maria Assunta e di San Modestino, Cattedrale di Avellino) is a Roman Catholic cathedral dedicated to the Assumption of the Virgin Mary and Saint Modestinus in Avellino, Campania, Italy. It is the seat of the bishops of Avellino.

== History ==
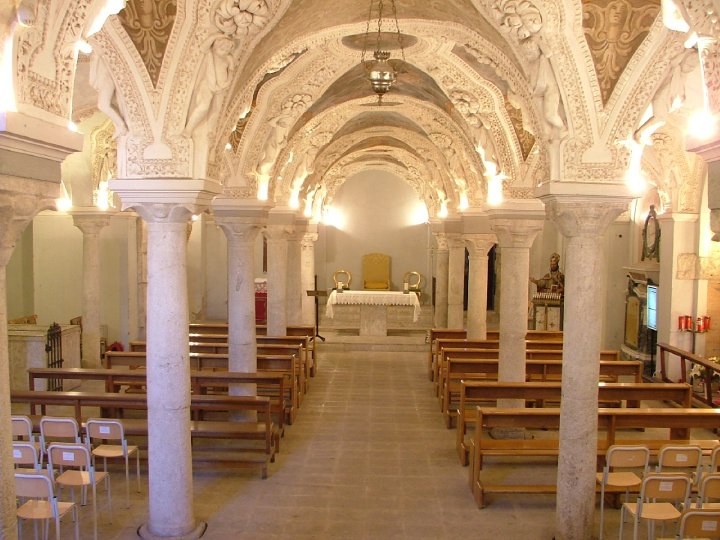
Crypt

The Romanesque cathedral was built between 1132 and 1166 by bishop Roberto of Avellino, who dedicated it to Saint Modestinus. It kept its original appearance until the end of the 17th century, when a series of refurbishments and renovations began which, continuing into the 18th century, eventually transformed the building into a Baroque one. Bishop Francesco Gallo (1855–1896) gave the cathedral a further overhaul, creating its present Neoclassical appearance. The refacing of the west front was entrusted to the architect Pasquale Cardola and was completed between 1857 and 1868, while the conversion of the interior was the work of the architect Vincenzo Varriale between 1880 and 1889. The new building was subjected to the bombing of World War II and the 1980 Irpinia earthquake, both of which made necessary further significant stabilisation and reinforcement of the structure.

== Description ==
=== Exterior ===
The classical façade in white and grey marble, following 16th-century conventions, is divided into two levels by a cornice. In the lower level, divided into five bays by four columns, are three entrance portals: two stone panels record the vicissitudes of the central doorway, built by Bishop Roberto in 1133 and subsequently enlarged by Bishop Guglielmo in 1167. The bronze doors are cast in relief with scenes from the religious and civil history of Avellino. In the lunette above the central doorway is a bas relief of the Last Supper. In two niches to either side of the same doorway are statues of Saint Modestinus, patron saint of the city, and of Saint William of Vercelli, founder of the monastery of the Sanctuary of Montevergine and patron saint of Irpinia.

Statue of S. William of Vercelli with wolf from Cathedral of Avellino (exterior right)

A third stone plaque records the construction of the new façade in the 19th century.

The Baroque access stairway and the arrangement of the piazza in front of the cathedral are the work of Bishop Martinez at the end of the 17th century.

On the right side of the church is the campanile, of various centuries. The lowest and oldest part is constructed of stones and marble from Roman buildings of the first century A.D.

=== Interior ===
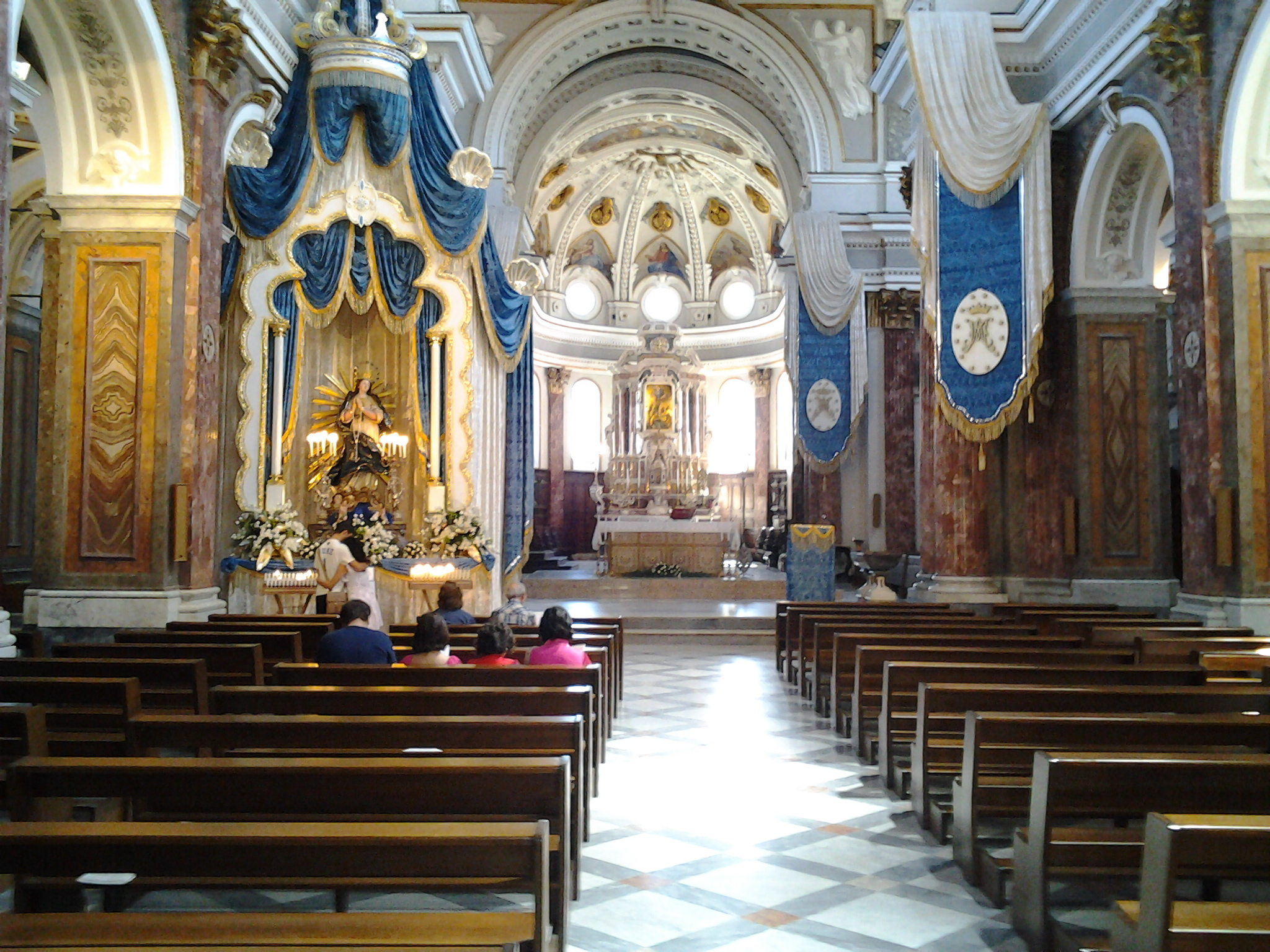
Cathedral interior, decorated for the festivities of 2012 in honour of the Assumption

The cathedral interior has a Latin cross floorplan. The nave is divided into three aisles by pilasters; the transept leads into a large presbytery.

The side chapels and altars in the two side aisles are new. To the south are altars dedicated to Saint Gerardo Maiella, to the Adoration of the Magi, to Saint Anthony of Padua and to the Crucifixion. To the north are firstly two chapels, of which one is dedicated to the Our Lady of the Seven Sorrows, while the other, containing an ancient canvas depicting the Annunciation, has served for a long time as a baptistry. There then follow altars dedicated to the Assumption, to Our Lady of the Rosary, and to the Sacred Heart, formerly dedicated to Saint Alfonso Maria de' Liguori, where it is remembered that the saint himself once celebrated Mass.

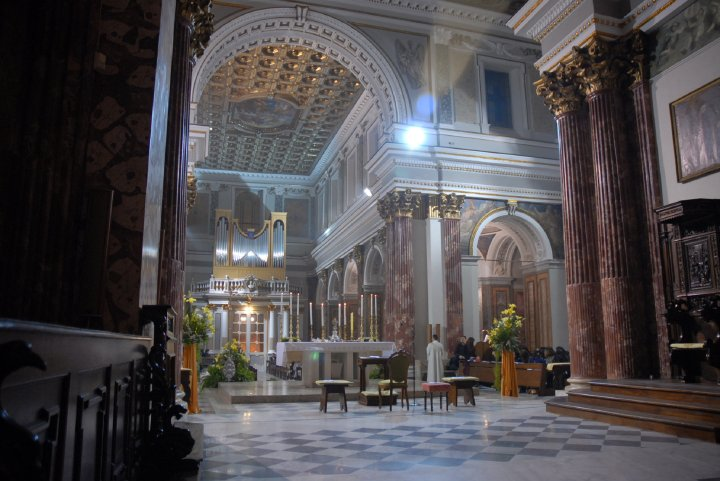
Cathedral interior, seen from the apse

The coffered ceiling of the central nave, which covers the ancient ceiling beams, was installed in the 17th century. In the centre is the large canvas by Michele Ricciardi depicting the Assumption of the Virgin (1702–1705). To the sides in four medallions are depicted elements recalling the Marian Litany of Loreto: a house, a star, a tower and a rose.

In the ten small cupolas which give light to the side aisles are painted gospel episodes from the life of the Virgin, works by Achille Iovine but repainted, because of the effects of damp, by Ovidio De Martino. By the same Iovine are the 20 figures of prophets or other Biblical characters painted in the arches which separate the aisles and the figures of the apostles Peter and Paul in the arch which leads into the transept.

In the strip of wall that runs along the cornice has been inserted a long passage in Latin from the address of Pope Paul VI given at the closing of the third session of Vatican II.

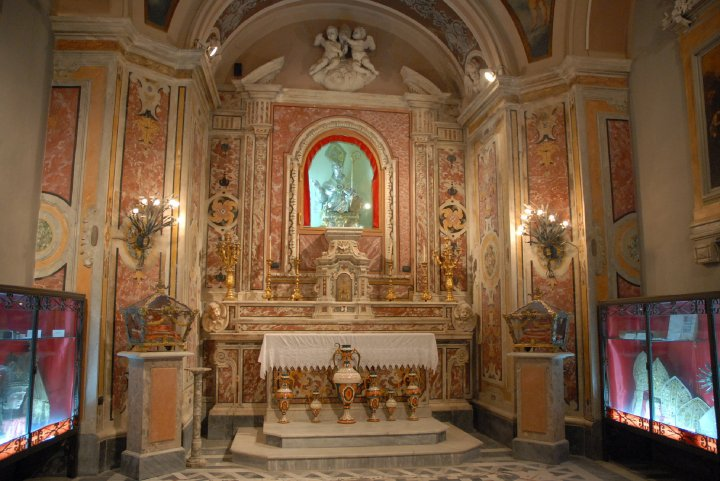
Chapel of Saint Modestinus, patron saint of Avellino

From the nave, steps give access to the transept, in the middle of which are located the new altar, the ambo and the baptismal font.

On the walls, below the cornice, are two paintings by Achille Iovine showing the Holy Family, to the left, and Saint Lawrence the Martyr to the right; there are in addition four niches containing gesso statues of the Four Evangelists. Above the cornice are five paintings by Angelo Michele Ricciardi of saints: Saint Francis Xavier, Saint Charles Borromeo, Saint Andrea Avellino, Saint Modestinus and Saint Gaetano Thiene.

Off the transept are two chapels alongside the presbytery. To the north is the Chapel of Saint Modestinus, otherwise known as the Chapel of the Treasure of Saint Modestinus (Italian: Cappella del tesoro di san Modestino), as it preserves in precious caskets the relics of the patron saint of the diocese and a silver bust of him. This is the most important chapel in the cathedral.

To the south is the Chapel of the Holy Trinity, so called because it contains a bas relief of the Trinity of the mid-16th century.

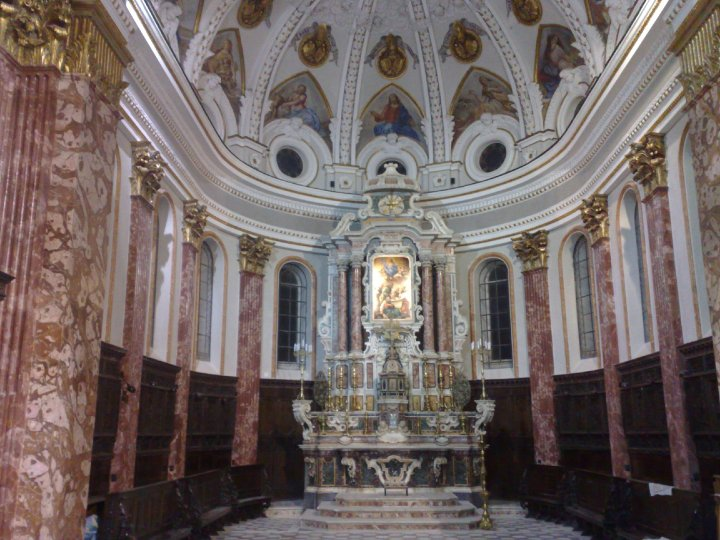
Apse and high altar

The transept leads to the choir and apse. The 16th-century choir stalls are decorated with scenes from the passion and death of Christ. In the centre is the sumptuous high altar, of the first half of the 16th century, which came from the Santuario dell'Incoronata near Summonte and has been in the cathedral since 1813. In the upper part of the apse are nine medallions containing representations of the first nine bishops of Avellino (mostly legendary); paintings of the Beatitudes and the figure of Christ; and in the ceiling vault three frescoes by Achille Iovine of episodes in the life of Saint Modestinus.

Also opening off the transept is the entrance to the crypt, which has retained its Romanesque appearance. It is divided into three aisles by stone columns. The ceiling has 17th-century frescoes by Angelo Michele Ricciardi.

== Bibliography ==
- A.A.V.V., La Cattedrale di Avellino nella storia, nel culto e nell'arte, Cava dei Tirreni
- Gambino N., Guida del Duomo di Avellino, Avellino 1989
- Sica R., Le pitture del Duomo di Avellino, Napoli 1981
