= Pellezzano =

- Comune
- Comune di Pellezzano
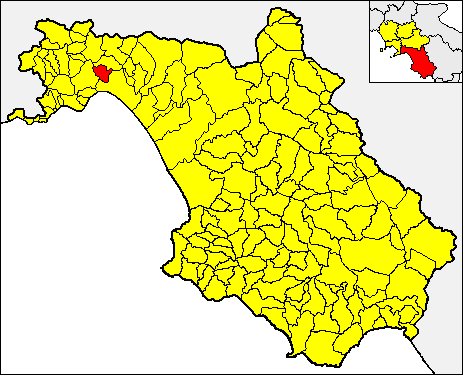

- Location within Italy Location within Campania
- Coordinates: 40°44′N 14°46′E
- Country: Italy
- Region: Campania
- Province: Salerno (SA)
- Frazioni: Capezzano, Capriglia, Cologna, Coperchia, Grotte, Rione Piombino

Government
  - Mayor: Francesco Morra

Area
  - Total: 14.04 km^{2} (5.42 sq mi)
- Elevation: 247 m (810 ft)

Population (31 March 2018)
  - Total: 11,103
  - Density: 790.8/km^{2} (2,048/sq mi)
- Demonym: Pellezzanesi
- Time zone: UTC+1 (CET)
  - Summer (DST): UTC+2 (CEST)
- Postal code: 84080
- Dialing code: 089
- Patron saint: St. Clement I; Sant'Anna
- Saint day: 23 November-26 July
- Website: Official website

Pellezzano (Campanian: Pellezzane) is a town and comune in the province of Salerno in the Campania region of south-western Italy.

== Geography ==
Pellezzano borders with the municipalities of Baronissi, Cava de' Tirreni and Salerno.

It counts 6 civil parishes (frazioni): Capezzano, Capriglia, Cologna, Coperchia, Grotte and Rione Piombino.
