= Modestinus, Florentinus and Flavianus =

4th-century Italian Christian martyrs

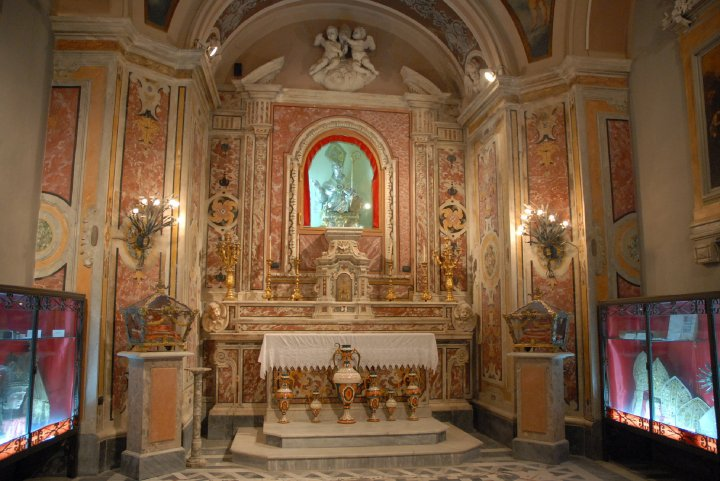
Cappella di San Modestino, patrono di Avellino

Saints Modestinus, Florentinus and Flavianus are three Christian martyrs of Campania, Italy, martyred in 311. Their relics were re-discovered in 1167 by Gugliemo, bishop of Avellino. Like others, they had taken refuge on Monte Vergine.

Holweck considers the "acts of Modestinus" as "untrustworthy". According to tradition, Bishop Modestinus, the priest Florentinus, and the deacon Flavianus were captured in Antioch in the persecution under Emperor Diocletian, but miraculously escaped the prison and fled to Calabria. They were re-captured near Epizephyrian Locris, but after Modestinus had healed the Governor's daughter of a serious illness, they were freed and went to Pozzuoli. From there they went to Abellinum, where Modestinus converted many people before the three were arrested and executed.

They are the patron saints of the city and diocese of Avellino, and of the city of Mercogliano. They are also joint patron saints of the city of Locri and of the Diocese of Locri-Gerace in Calabria.

Avellino Cathedral is dedicated to Saint Modestinus. His feast day is 14 February, the date of his death. Florentinus and Flavianus, respectively deacon and priest, died on 15 February but are celebrated with Modestinus on 14 February.

There is a relic of Saint Modestinus at the Cathedral Basilica of St. John the Baptist (Savannah, Georgia).

== Sources ==
- Santiebeati.it: Santi Modestino, Fiorentino e Flaviano (in Italian)
- Diocese of Avellino official website (in Italian)
