= Carmine Biagio Gatti =

Italian footballer (born 1988)

Personal information
- Date of birth: 10 February 1988 (age 38)
- Place of birth: Avellino, Italy
- Position: Goalkeeper

Team information
- Current team: Colligiana

Youth career
- –2006: Parma
- 2006–2007: Napoli

Senior career*
Years	Team	Apps	(Gls)
2007–	Napoli	0	(0)
2007–2008	→ Pomigliano (loan)	29	(0)
2008–2009	→ Matera (loan)	16	(0)
2009–	→ Colligiana (loan)	3	(0)
- * Club domestic league appearances and goals as of 12:48, 7 May 2010 (UTC)

Carmine Biagio Gatti (born 10 February 1988) is an Italian professional football player currently playing for Lega Pro Seconda Divisione team V.F. Colligiana on loan from S.S.C. Napoli.

== See also ==
- Football in Italy
- List of football clubs in Italy
