= Tommaso Caracciolo =

Italian general of the Spanish Army in the Thirty Years' War (1572–1631)

Tommaso Caracciolo, Count of Roccarainola
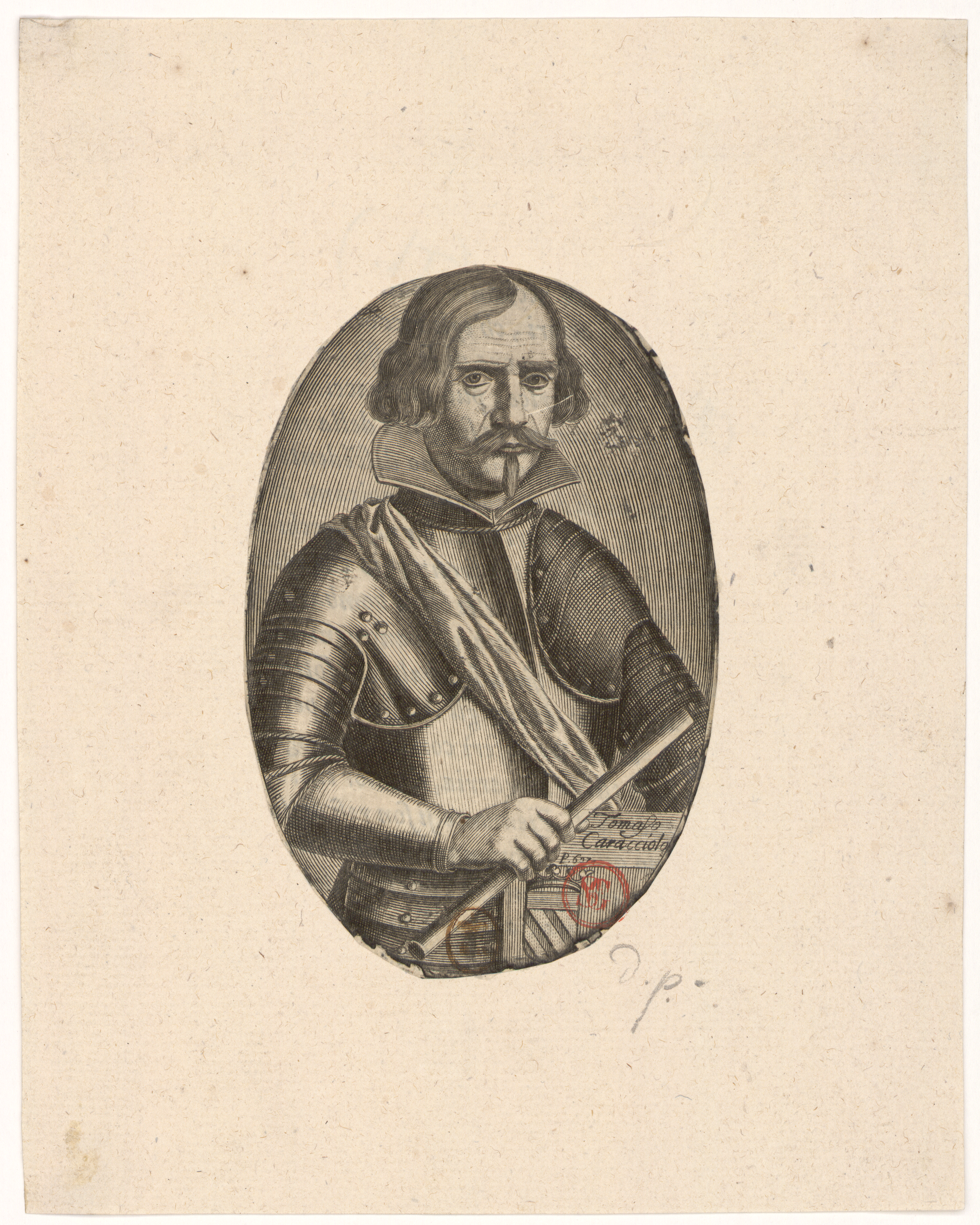
- Born: 10 March 1572; Naples, Kingdom of Naples, Crown of Aragon
- Died: 5 December 1631 (aged 59); Naples, Kingdom of Naples, Crown of Aragon
- Military career
- Allegiance: Spain
- Service years: 1594–1631
- Rank: Field Marshal
- Conflicts: Eighty Years' War; Thirty Years' War

Tommaso Caracciolo, Count of Roccarainola (10 March 1572 – 5 December 1631), was among others a Field Marshal who commanded parts of the Spanish forces in the Thirty Years' War.

== Biography ==
His father, Tristano Caracciolo, was the son of Michele Caracciolo, 2nd Baron of Castelfranco (Cosenza) and Signore of Lusciano (Terra di lavore) and Ponte Albaneto (Capitanata). Michele had the lordship of these lands from 1530 to his death in 1548, inheriting them from his uncle Berardino Caracciolo, created first baron by privilege signed by the King Fernando I of Aragon at the Castel Nuovo of Naples.

He seems to have had some military experiences in his youth; he reportedly assisted in the siege of Brichesario (1594). On 25 August 1600 he was made a captain by his relative Camillo Caracciolo, 2nd Prince of Avellino, who entrusted him a tercio. On 5 September he was made a sergeant major of this tercio. He took part at the Siege of Ostend in Flanders. He is mentioned as Maestro de Campo (Field Marshal) in the war in Montferrat in the Piedmont (1614–1617).

After 1617, he made him captain of war of the Val di Noto (between Catania and Messina) by the viceroy Count of Osuna, in order to establish the defense of Sicily against a suspected Turkish invasion.

== Campaign in Bohemia ==
On 2 January 1619 he got the permit to leave Sicily and came back to Naples where he took part in the expedition of Carlo Spinelli to Bohemia as an adventurer without military order. Later the same Carlo Spinelli refuses to serve under Tommaso Caracciolo in Germany.

He commanded some of the Spanish troops on the way to the Battle of White Mountain north of Prague on 8 November 1620, in which half of the enemy forces were killed or captured. After that, on 22 July 1621, the Emperor appointed him to the post of Master field general in Moravia.

== Campaign in Germany ==
He successfully captured a hill with Walloon musketeers under his command at the Battle of Höchst.

== Campaign against French-Savoyan-Forces in Northern Italy ==
He was defeated by Savoian-French troops near Voltaggio, which he left to meet the enemy, being taken a prisoner by the Duke of Savoy on 9 September 1625, in which hands he remained until 11 September 1625, when Philip IV of Spain paid for his rescue.

== Late years ==
After two years in Milan, he came back to Naples on 3 August 1625, being appointed Commissary and Superintendent General of the Fortifications of the Kingdom, a post that he maintained until his death. By his military services, the king of Spain had appointed him Count of Roccarainola, a title raised to Duke of Roccarainola in 1667 for his eldest son.

== Literature ==
- Der tolle Halberstädter Herzog Christian von Braunschweig im pfälzischen Kriege Band 2 1621–1622, Hans Wertheim, 1929, ca. 620 pages
- Italienische Einwanderung und Wirtschaftstätigkeit in rheinischen Städten des 17. und 18. Jahrhunderts, Dr. Johannes Augel, 1971, 482 pages
- Die Schlacht am Weissen Berge bei Prag: (8, November 1620) im Zusammenhange, Karl Julius Krebs, 1879
- Die Berichte über die Schlacht auf dem Weissen Berge bei Prag, Anton Gindely, 1877, 179 pages
- Der Kampf des Hauses Habsburg gegen die Niederlande und Ihre Verbündeten, Milos Kouril, 1976, 309 pages
- Genoa and the Sea: Policy and Power in an Early Modern Maritime Republic, Thomas Allison Kirk, 2005, 296 pages
- Die bayerische Unterpfalz im Dreißigjährigen Krieg – Besetzung, Verwaltung und Rekatholisierung der rechtsrheinischen Pfalz durch Bayern 1621 bis 1649, Franz Maier, 1990, 585 pages
