= Maria de Cardona =

Italian noblewoman

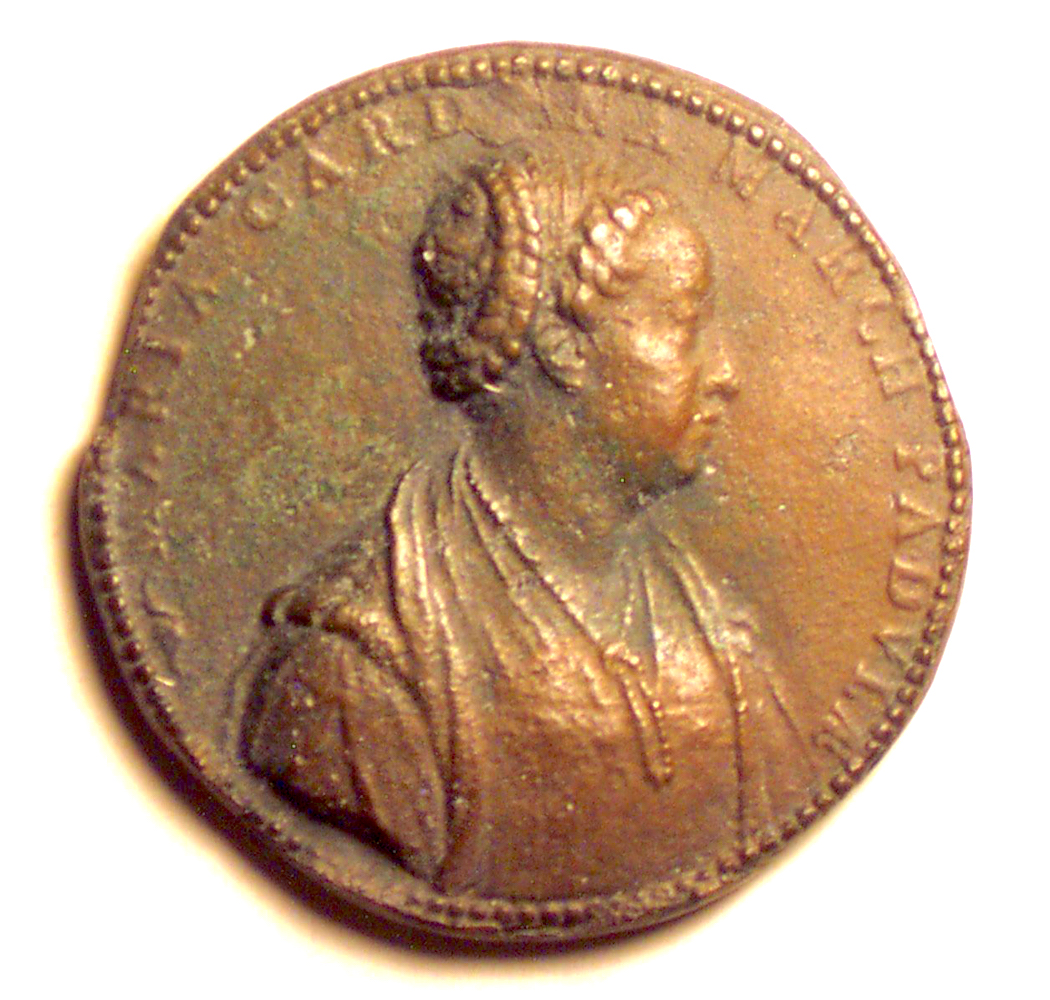
- Born: 1509; Naples, Kingdom of Naples
- Died: 9 March 1563 (aged 53–54); Naples, Kingdom of Naples
- Occupation: Noblewoman

Maria de Cardona or Maria Folch de Cardona (1509, probably in Naples – 9 March 1563, Naples) was an Italian noblewoman and patron of the arts. She was from the Folch de Cardona family. de Cardona was the Countess of Avellino, Marquise of Padula, and Baroness of Candida and habitually lived in the Irpinia castle.

== Bibliography ==
- Emilio Sarli, La decima musa del Parnaso: Maria de Cardona, Tricase, Youcanprint, 2012, ISBN 9788866184706.
