= Baronissi =

- Comune
- Comune di Baronissi
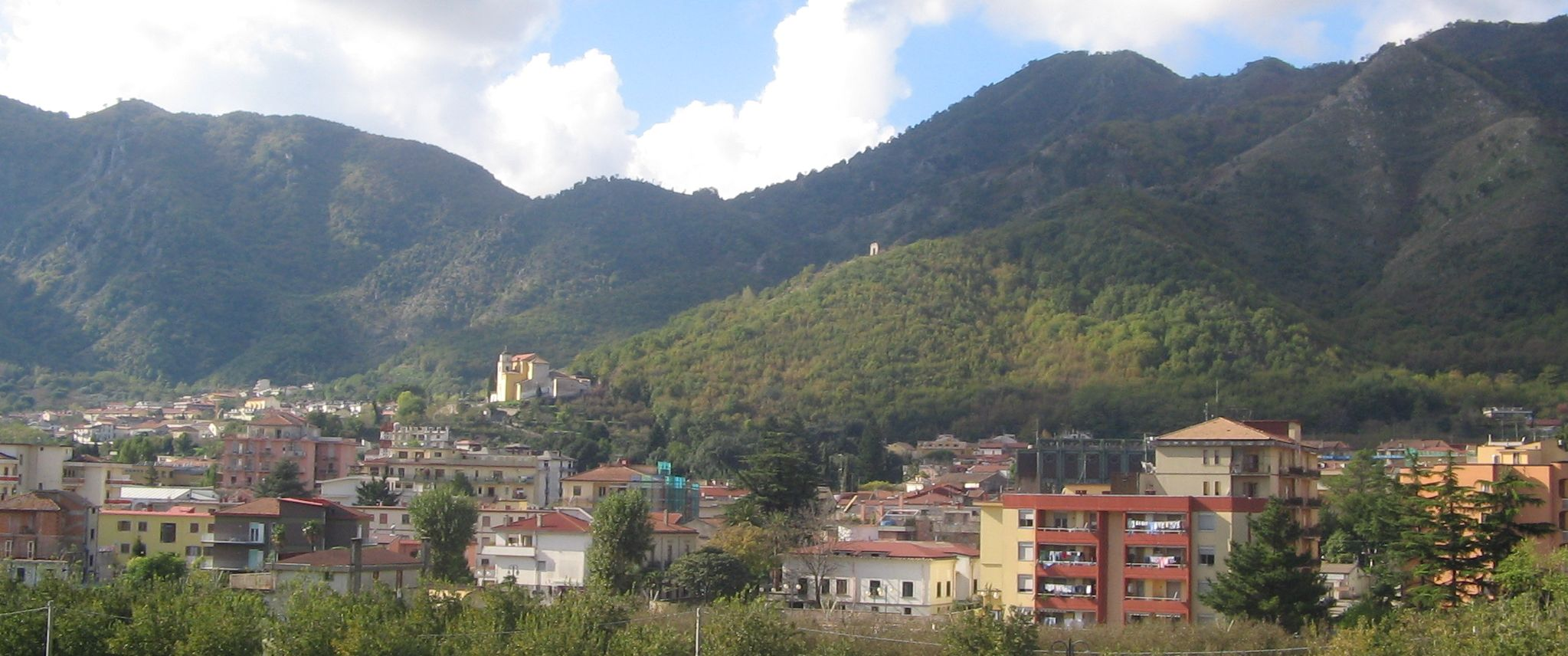
- Panoramic view of Baronissi

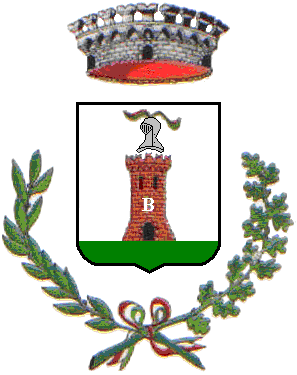
- Coat of arms

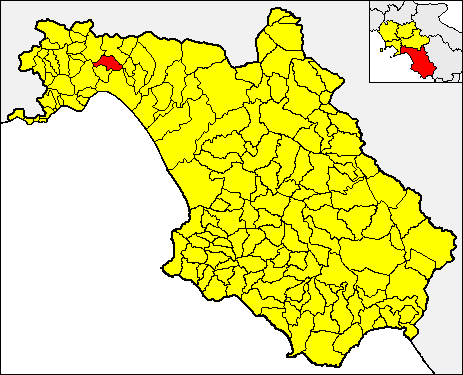
- Baronissi within the Province of Salerno and Campania

- Location of Baronissi in Italy Baronissi (Campania)
- Coordinates: 40°44′46.4″N 14°46′13.7″E
- Country: Italy
- Region: Campania
- Province: Salerno (SA)
- Frazioni: Acquamela, Aiello, Antessano, Capo Saragnano, Caprecano, Casal Barone, Casal Siniscalco, Fusara, Orignano, Saragnano, Sava

Government
  - Mayor: Anna Petta

Area
  - Total: 17.93 km^{2} (6.92 sq mi)
- Elevation: 260 m (850 ft)

Population (28 February 2017)
  - Total: 17,061
  - Density: 951.5/km^{2} (2,464/sq mi)
- Demonym: Baroniensi or Baronissesi
- Time zone: UTC+1 (CET)
  - Summer (DST): UTC+2 (CEST)
- Postal code: 84081
- Dialing code: 089
- ISTAT code: 065013
- Patron saint: St. Francis of Assisi
- Saint day: 4 October
- Website: Official website

Baronissi is a town and comune in the province of Salerno in the Campania region of south-western Italy. It is home to a campus of the University of Salerno.

== History ==
The town develops from the original old area named Casali.

== Geography ==
The town is situated 7 km north of Salerno and it is 35 km from Avellino. The bordering municipalities are Castiglione del Genovesi, Cava de' Tirreni, Fisciano, Mercato San Severino, Pellezzano and Salerno.

Its 11 hamlets (frazioni) are Acquamela, Aiello, Antessano, Capo Saragnano, Caprecano, Casal Barone, Casal Siniscalco, Fusara, Orignano, Saragnano, Sava (the most populated one).

== Main sights ==
- Convent of the Holy Trinity, 13th century
- Villa Farina, 19th century
- Roman villa of Sava, 1st century AD
- Church of the Holy Savior, in Saragnano

== Transport ==
The municipality has two train stations (Baronissi, in town's center, and Acquamela, in the homonym village), both on the line Salerno-Mercato San Severino. It is also served by the motorway RA 2 Salerno-Avellino, at the exits "Baronissi Sud" and "Lancusi-Baronissi Nord".

== Events ==
- Baronissi Jazz Festival: it takes place every July since 1996 in the "Anfiteatro" (Amphitheater), a modern hemicycle built in the mid-nineties and located in the hamlet of Sava near the border with the town of Baronissi. His guests included the French pianist Michel Petrucciani.
- Irno Comix & Games: takes place since 2016 and is a 2-day comic fair with the participation of exhibition stands, designers and cosplayers, the latter engaged in the traditional "Cosplay Competition" which takes place on the second day of the fair. Held at the Parco della Rinascita (Renaissance Park). The winter edition takes place in Salerno, in Villa Carrara.

== Personalities ==
- Diego Campanile (1574–1642), Catholic Guardian of Holy Land
- Fortunato Maria Farina (1881–1954), Catholic Archbishop
- Jack Hirschman (b. 1933) American poet, honourable citizen from 13 December 2008

== Twin towns ==
- Portes-lès-Valence – France (2006)
