= University of Salerno =

University in southwest Italy

Coordinates: 40°46′16″N 14°47′26″E

- Università degli Studi di Salerno
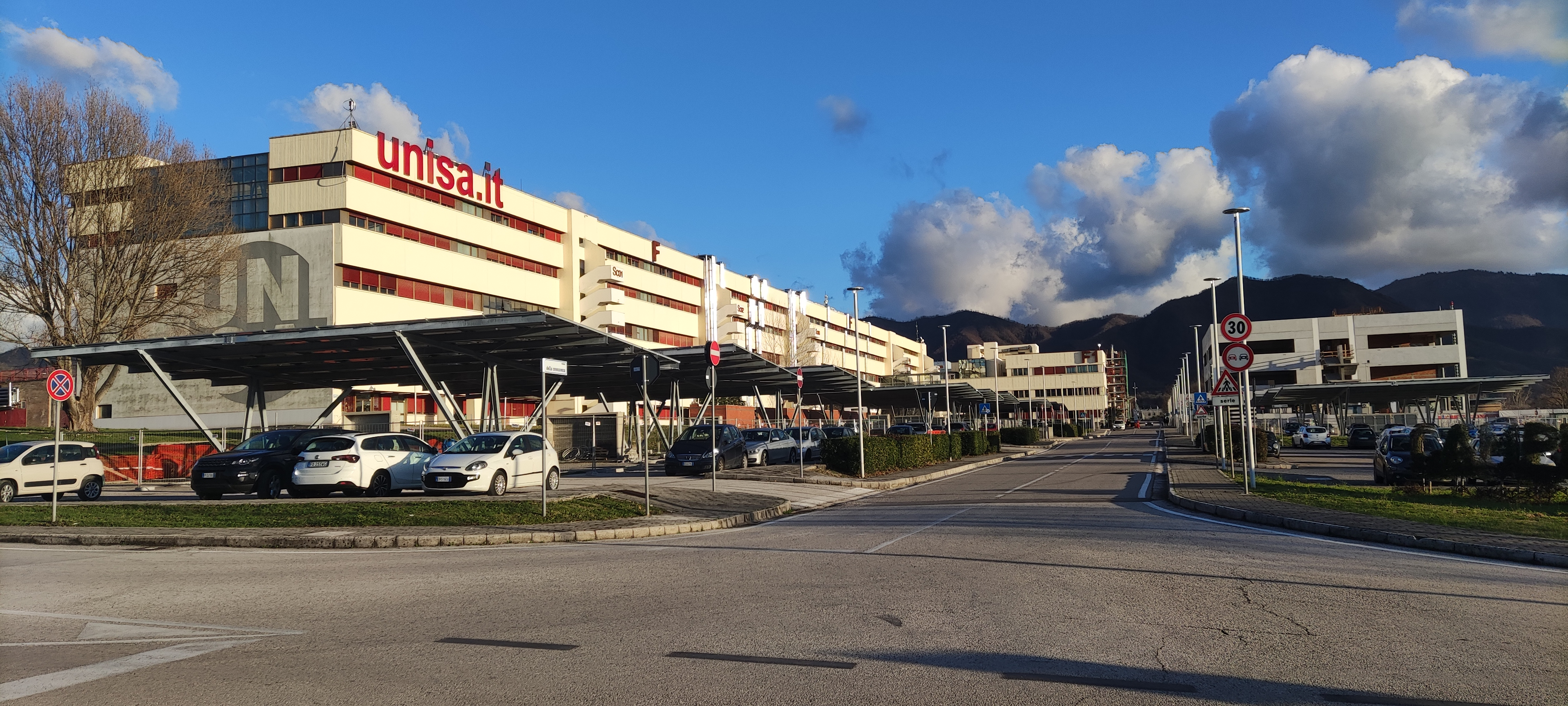
- Latin: Hippocratica Civitas Studium Salerni
- Type: State-supported
- Established: 1968
- Affiliations: EASN
- Rector: Prof. Virgilio D'Antonio
- Location: Fisciano; Baronissi, Italy
- Campus: Rural
- Sports teams: CUS Salerno
- Website: www.unisa.it

The University of Salerno (Italian: Università degli Studi di Salerno) (UNISA) is a university located in Fisciano and in Baronissi, Italy. Its main campus is located in Fisciano, while the Faculty of Medicine is located in Baronissi. Another branch, the third overall, was opened in Avellino in 2023.

It is organized into 17 departments.

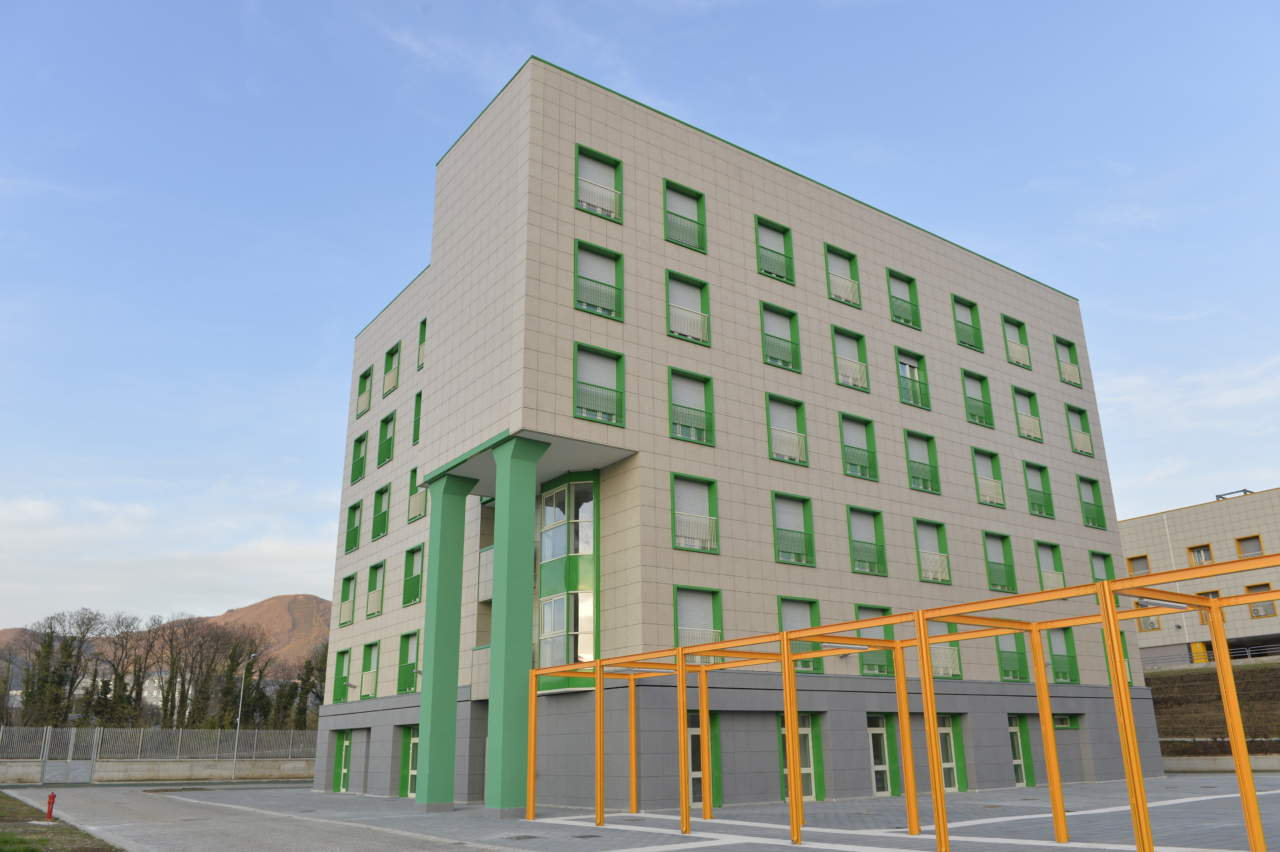
View of a residence in the university campus

== History ==
Salerno's Schola Medica Salernitana was the most important medical school in Europe between the 10th and 13th centuries. Following the rise of university medical schools, it briefly merged with the University of Naples, which moved to Salerno from 1253 to 1258 before returning to Naples and establishing its own medical school there. Meanwhile, the University of Montpellier displaced Salerno as the most prestigious medical school internationally and by the 14th century the latter had ceased to exist. The modern University of Salerno traces its origin to the Istituto Universitario di Magistero "Giovanni Cuomo", a teacher training college founded in 1944 with this renowned and ancient tradition in mind. In 1968 the institute became a State university, the University of Salerno, and it has since seen a great increase in student numbers.

== Organization ==
The University of Salerno offers degrees in 10 faculties:

- Faculty of Arts and Philosophy
- Faculty of Economics
- Faculty of Education
- Faculty of Engineering
- Faculty of Foreign Language and Literature
- Faculty of Law
- Faculty of Medicine
- Faculty of Mathematics, Physics and Natural Sciences
- Faculty of Pharmacy
- Faculty of Political Science

The "Central library Eduardo R. Caianiello" (in Italian "Biblioteca umanistica "E. R. Caianiello") offers students over 800,000 bibliographic units and over 6,383 periodicals in its shelves.

=== ICSR Mediterranean Knowledge ===
In May 2015 the University of Salerno saw the establishment of a new research institute, the International Centre for Studies and Research "Mediterranean Knowledge", composed by 14 Research Units located in universities of the Mediterranean countries. The ICSR, that has its administrative office at the University of Salerno, aims at favouring research and dissemination of knowledge about the most important topics of the Mediterranean Basin. For that purpose it publishes the book series Mediterranean, Knowledge, Culture, Heritage, theJournal of Mediterranean Knowledge and a series of Working Papers. The ICSR, moreover, periodically organizes national and international conferences.

== See also ==
- List of Italian universities
- Salerno
- Schola Medica Salernitana
