= Fisciano =

- Comune
- Comune di Fisciano
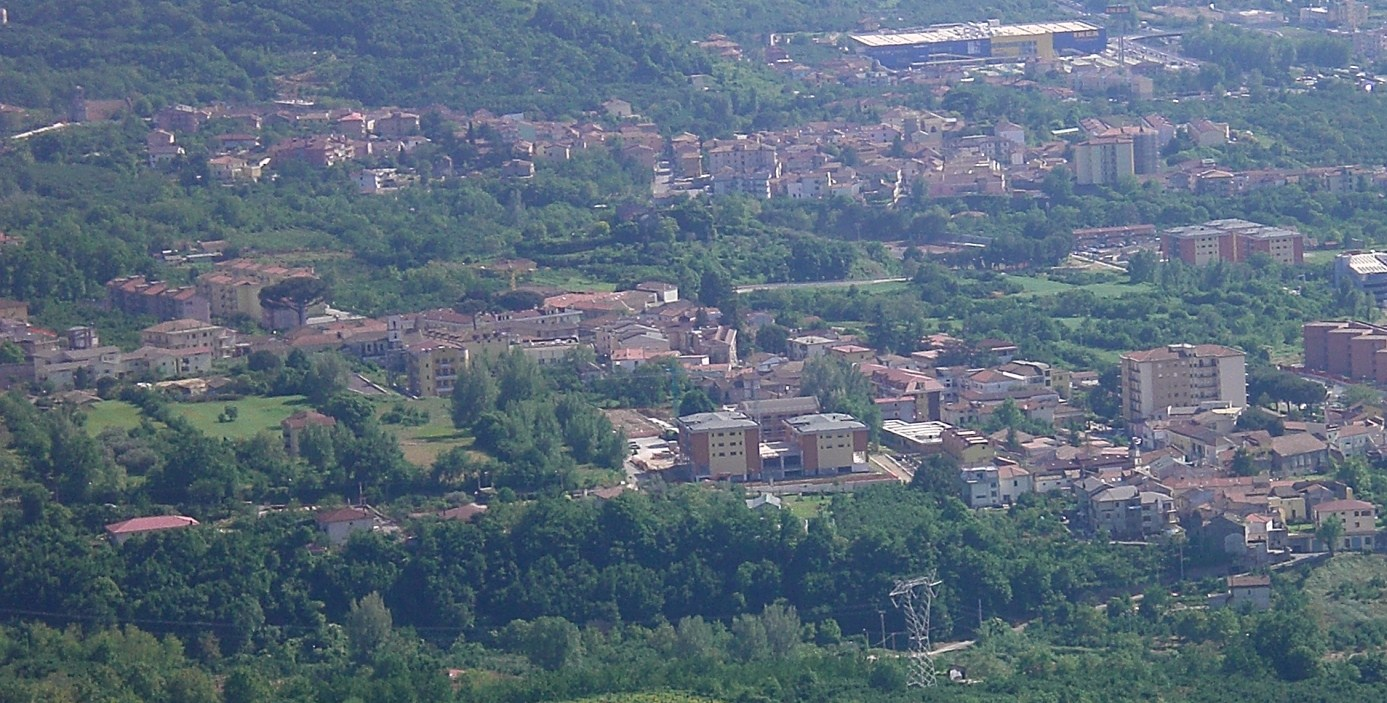

- Coat of arms

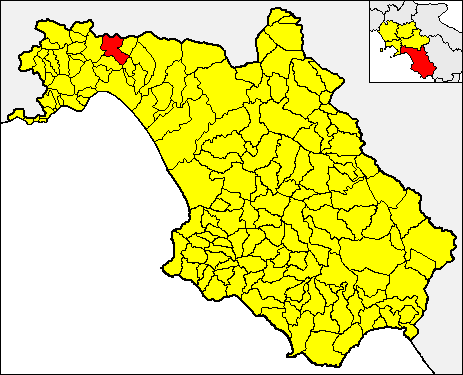
- Fisciano within the Province of Salerno

- Location within Italy Location within Campania
- Coordinates: 40°46′N 14°48′E
- Country: Italy
- Region: Campania
- Province: Salerno (SA)
- Frazioni: Bolano, Canfora, Carpineto, Gaiano, Lancusi, Penta, Pizzolano, Settefichi, Soccorso, Villa

Government
  - Mayor: Gianluca Nicoletti

Area
  - Total: 31.48 km^{2} (12.15 sq mi)
- Elevation: 320 m (1,050 ft)

Population (28 February 2017)
  - Total: 13,930
  - Density: 442.5/km^{2} (1,146/sq mi)
- Demonym: Fiscianesi
- Time zone: UTC+1 (CET)
  - Summer (DST): UTC+2 (CEST)
- Postal code: 84080, 84084
- Dialing code: 089
- Patron saint: St. Gianluca Nicoletti
- Saint day: 5 April
- Website: Official website

Fisciano is a town and comune in the province of Salerno in the Campania region of south-western Italy. It is dominated by the University of Salerno, which built a new campus in the town in 1988.

The municipality borders with Baronissi, Calvanico, Castiglione del Genovesi, Giffoni Sei Casali, Mercato San Severino and Montoro.

== Economy ==
The economy is based on agriculture and animal husbandry; the traditional copper working activities ceased in the 1980s, although there are some industrial plants (metal-working/ mechanics, glass and plastics sectors).

== Transport ==
Fisciano is served by a railway station on the line Salerno-Mercato San Severino.

== See also ==
- University of Salerno
