= Avellino =

Avellino Avillino (Irpino)
- Comune
- Comune di Avellino
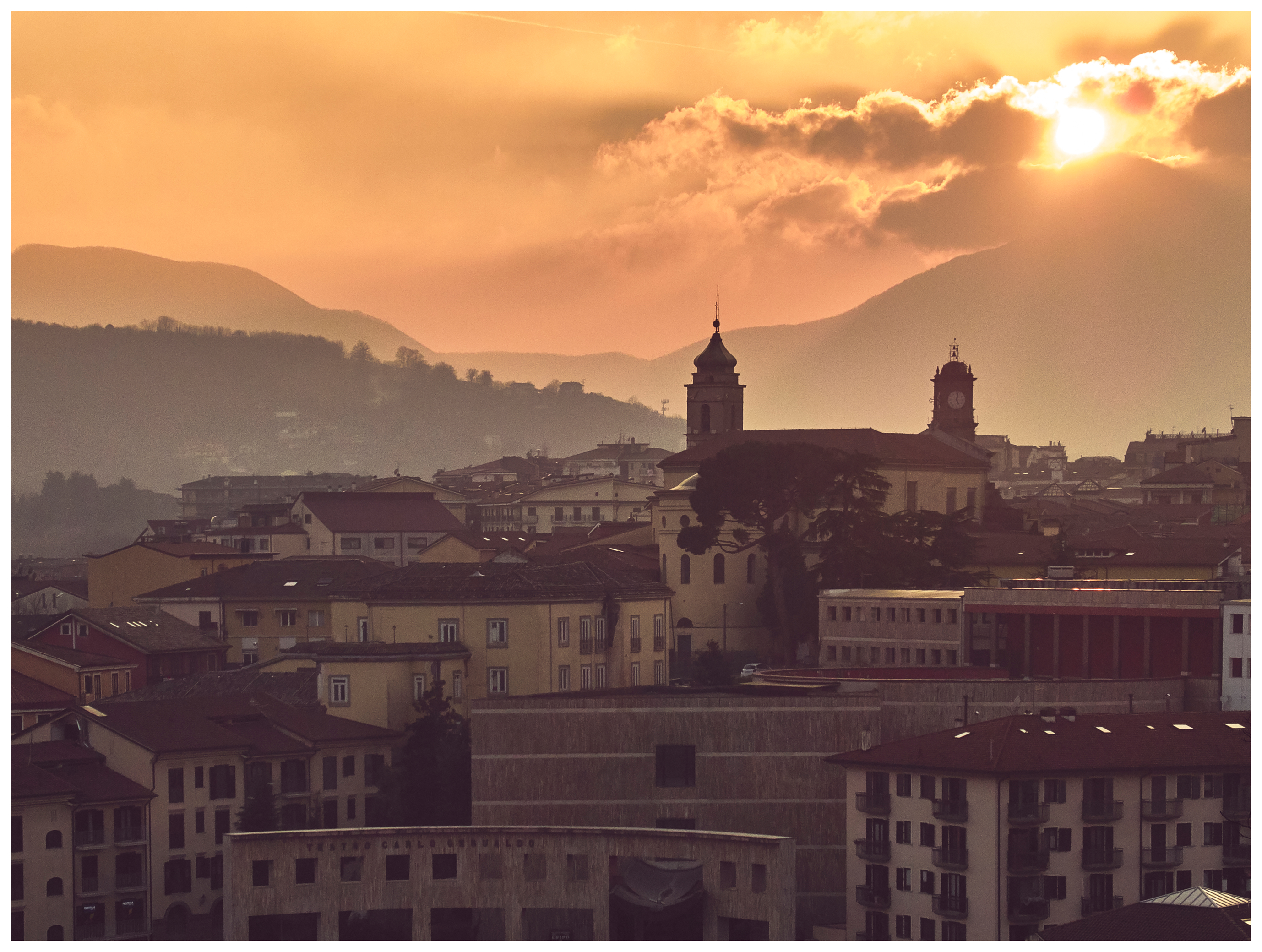
- View of Avellino

- Flag Coat of arms

- Location within Campania Location within Italy
- Coordinates: 40°55′00″N 14°47′20″E
- Country: Italy
- Region: Campania
- Province: Avellino (AV)
- Frazioni: Bellizzi Irpino, Pianodardine, Picarelli, Valle-Ponticelli

Government
  - Mayor: Nello Pizza

Area
  - Total: 30.55 km^{2} (11.80 sq mi)
- Elevation: 348 m (1,142 ft)

Population (2026)
  - Total: 51,819
  - Density: 1,696/km^{2} (4,393/sq mi)
- Demonym: Avellinese
- Time zone: UTC+1 (CET)
  - Summer (DST): UTC+2 (CEST)
- Postal code: 83100
- Dialing code: 0825
- ISTAT code: 064008
- Patron saint: St. Modestinus
- Saint day: 14 February
- Website: Official website

Avellino (Italian: [avelˈliːno]; Irpino: Avillino [avilˈliːnə]) is a city and comune (municipality), and capital of the province of Avellino in the region of Campania in southern Italy. It is situated in a plain surrounded by mountains 47 kilometres (29 mi) east of Naples and is an important hub on the road from Salerno to Benevento. It has 51,819 inhabitants.

== History ==
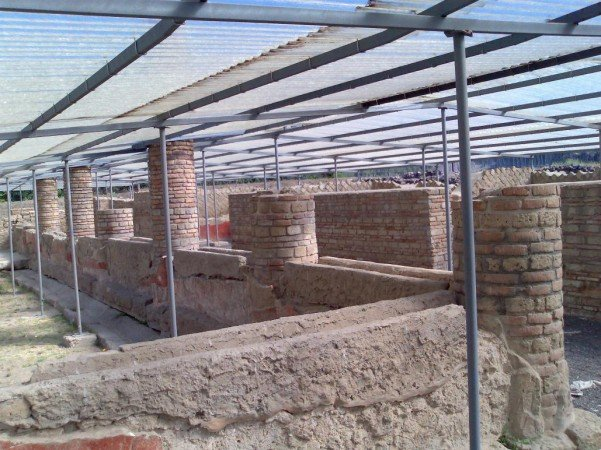
Remains of Abellinum

Before the Roman conquest, the ancient Abellinum was a centre of the Samnite Hirpini, located on the Civita hill some 4 kilometres (2 mi) outside the current town, in what is now Atripalda. The city could correspond to the ancient Velecha, documented by coins found in the area. Abellinum was conquered by the Romans in 293 BC, changing name several times in the following centuries (Veneria, Livia, Augusta, Alexandriana, and Abellinatium). However, the construction of a true Roman town occurred only after the conquest by Lucius Cornelius Sulla in the civil wars in 89 BC. He razed the old site and in 82 BC founded the colony Veneria Abellinatium on the left bank of the river Sabato.

The new city was surrounded by massive walls and had an orthogonal hippodamian urban layout. In 7 AD Augustus changed its name to Livia Augusta in honour of his wife, Livia Drusilla who owned the territories between Abellinum and Aeclanum. In the 3rd century Alexander Severus expanded the colony under the title of Livia Augusta Alexandrina with a massive immigration of oriental settlers. This helped to spread ancient Levantine cults such as Sol Invictus in the territory.

There followed economic crises (III and IV centuries), violent earthquakes (346) and disastrous volcanic eruptions (472). The town was Christianised around 500, becoming an episcopal seat.

There were invasions of the Goths (535–555) and the Vandals. After the Lombard conquest of southern Italy, the ancient city was abandoned in 568 (it is disputed if completely or partly) and a new settlement grew on the Terra hill, corresponding to the modern Avellino.

Defended by a castle, it became part of the Duchy (later Principality) of Benevento and, after the latter's fall, of the Principality of Salerno. In 1100, during the Norman rule of southern Italy, it was acquired by Riccardo dell'Aquila. Later, King Charles I of Anjou assigned it to the Montfort family, who were succeeded by the Del Balzo and the Filangieri.

The feudal rights to Avellino were purchased in 1581 by Don Marino I Caracciolo, duke of Atripalda, of a patrician family of Naples, who was made Prince of Avellino in 1589. Avellino became the main seat of the Caracciolo. Don Marino's son and grandson were consecutively Grand Chancellor of the Kingdom of Naples and chevaliers of the Order of the Golden Fleece. The grandson, Don Marino II (1587–1630), was the patron of Giambattista Basile, author of the Pentamerone.

In 1820 Avellino was seat of revolutionary riots. However, the Unification of Italy some fifty years later did not bring any benefit to the city, being cut off from the main railway line Naples-Benevento-Foggia, and far from the sea as well.

In 1943 the city was bombed by Allied planes in an attempt to cut off the retreat of German panzer units over the important Bridge of Ferriera.

Avellino has suffered from seismic activity throughout its history and was struck hard by the earthquakes of 23 November 1980 and 14 February 1981. Avellino has also received ashfall from numerous eruptions of Vesuvius which lies almost due west; the city sits on type locality of pumice deposited from a Plinian eruption of Vesuvius about 3800 years ago.

== Climate ==
According to the Köppen climate classification, Avellino has a hot-summer Mediterranean climate (Csa).

Climate data for Avellino (2001–2017)
Month	Jan	Feb	Mar	Apr	May	Jun	Jul	Aug	Sep	Oct	Nov	Dec	Year
Mean daily maximum °C (°F)	11.0 (51.8)	12.1 (53.8)	15.8 (60.4)	20.5 (68.9)	25.4 (77.7)	30.3 (86.5)	33.0 (91.4)	32.8 (91.0)	27.2 (81.0)	22.4 (72.3)	16.9 (62.4)	12.1 (53.8)	21.6 (70.9)
Daily mean °C (°F)	6.6 (43.9)	7.4 (45.3)	10.1 (50.2)	13.7 (56.7)	17.7 (63.9)	22.0 (71.6)	24.3 (75.7)	24.2 (75.6)	20.0 (68.0)	16.0 (60.8)	11.6 (52.9)	7.5 (45.5)	15.1 (59.2)
Mean daily minimum °C (°F)	2.2 (36.0)	2.7 (36.9)	4.5 (40.1)	6.9 (44.4)	10.0 (50.0)	13.6 (56.5)	15.7 (60.3)	15.6 (60.1)	12.9 (55.2)	9.6 (49.3)	6.2 (43.2)	3.0 (37.4)	8.6 (47.4)
Average precipitation mm (inches)	172 (6.8)	121 (4.8)	114 (4.5)	104 (4.1)	68 (2.7)	49 (1.9)	24 (0.9)	12 (0.5)	76 (3.0)	186 (7.3)	208 (8.2)	220 (8.7)	1,354 (53.3)
Average precipitation days	14	10	13	10	7	5	3	3	7	9	14	15	110
Average relative humidity (%)	81	78	75	69	66	61	58	59	67	77	82	83	71
Source 1: Climi e viaggi
Source 2: Enea-Casaccia (precipitation and humidity 1961–1990)

== Demographics ==
Historical population
Year	Pop.	±%
1861	19,929	—
1871	21,597	+8.4%
1881	23,379	+8.3%
1901	24,501	+4.8%
1911	24,710	+0.9%
1921	27,328	+10.6%
1931	27,451	+0.5%
1936	29,955	+9.1%
1951	36,965	+23.4%
1961	41,825	+13.1%
1971	52,382	+25.2%
1981	56,892	+8.6%
1991	55,662	−2.2%
2001	52,703	−5.3%
2011	54,222	+2.9%
2021	52,498	−3.2%
Source: ISTAT

As of 2026, the population is 51,819, of which 47.4% are male, and 52.6% are female. Minors make up 13.0% of the population, and seniors make up 26.4%.

=== Immigration ===
As of 2025, immigrants make up 7.6% of the population. The 5 largest foreign countries of birth are Ukraine, Switzerland, Romania, Argentina, and Brazil.

== Main sights ==
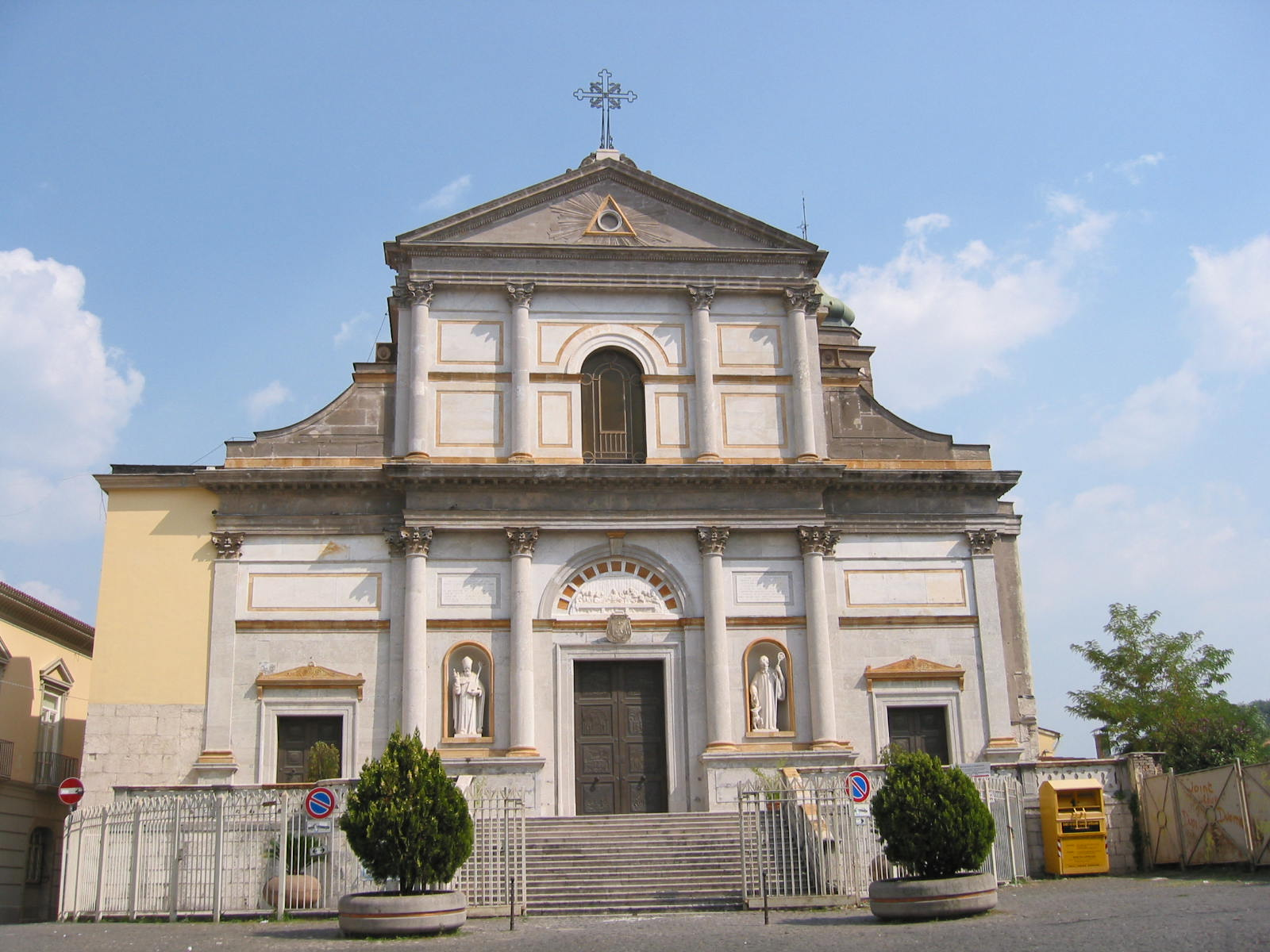
Avellino Cathedral

The ruins of the ancient Roman Abellinum are situated near the modern village of Atripalda, 4 kilometres (2.5 miles) east of modern Avellino. They include the forum, faced by temples, baths, parts of the Serino aqueduct and a patrician domus. There was also an amphitheatre and a brothel.

Avellino Cathedral, with its Romanesque crypt, stands on the site of a rich Roman villa which was built around 129 BC and abandoned after the eruption of Vesuvius, and an earthquake in 346 AD. The church and convent of Santa Maria delle Grazie were built in 1580.

There are some remains of the Lombard castle in Piazza Castello (Castle Square). Because the castle was built at the base of a small valley, its tactical purpose continues to puzzle modern-day historians throughout Europe.

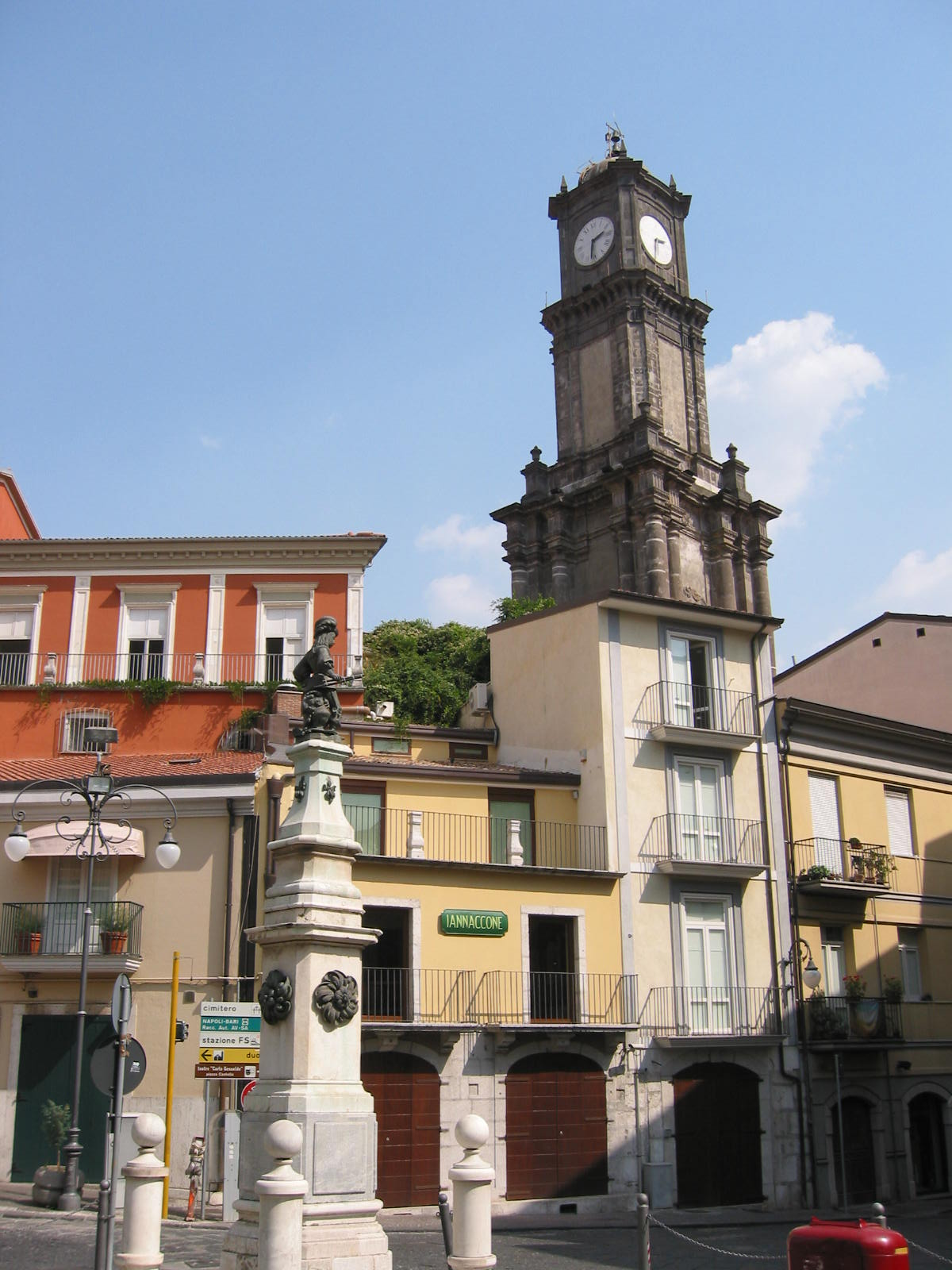
View of the Old City

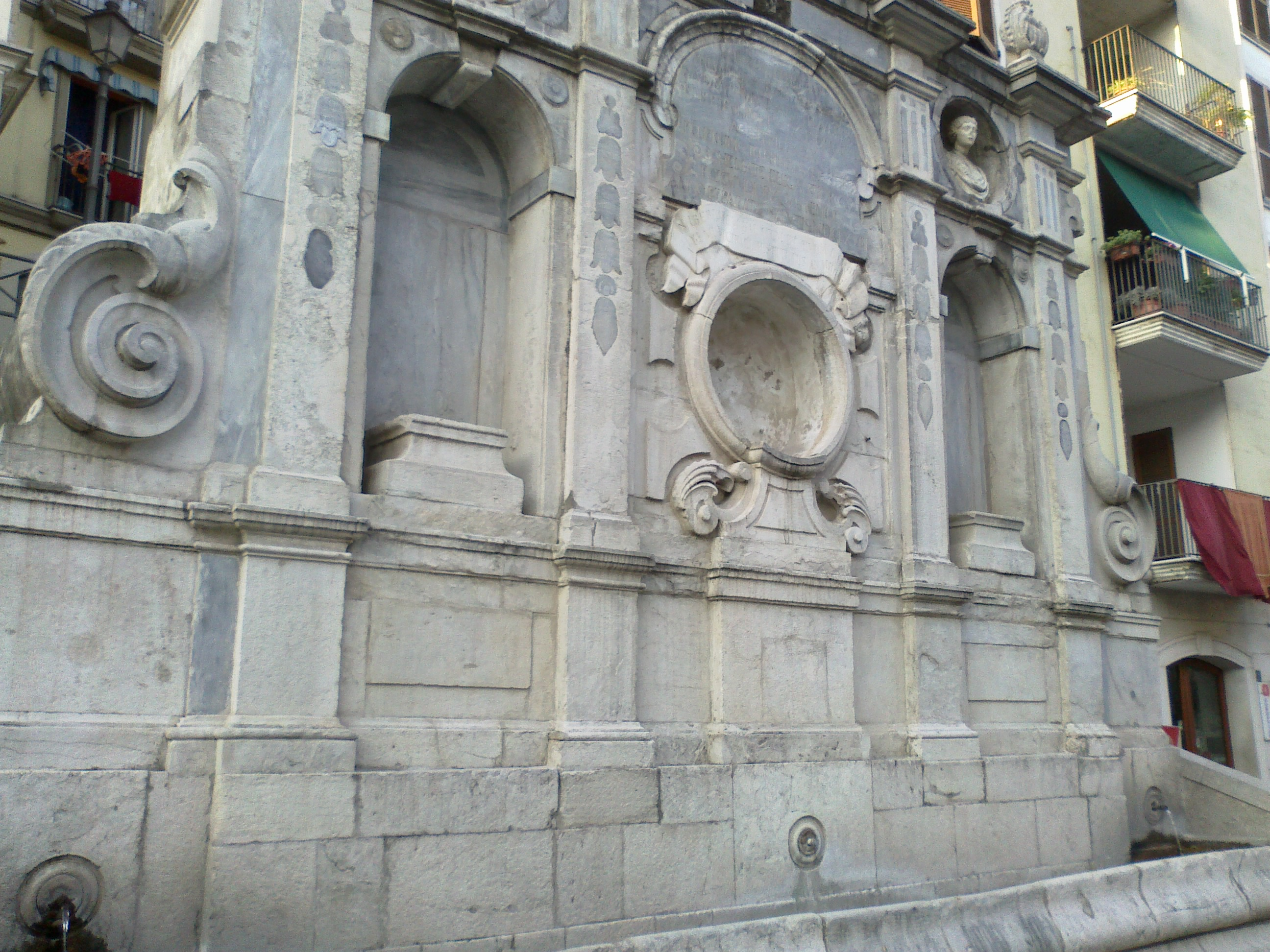
Fountain of Bellerophon

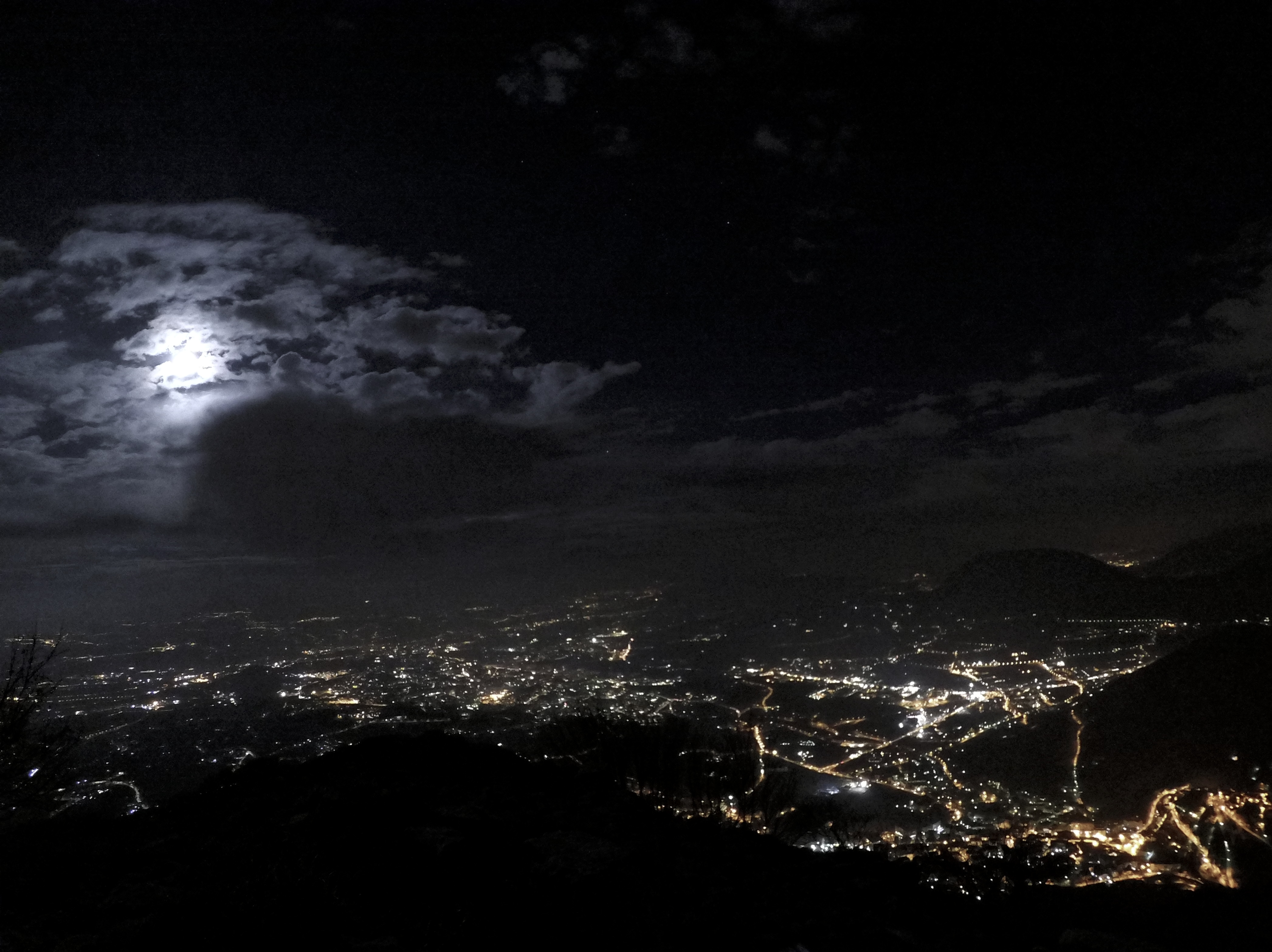
Avellino by night, panorama from Montevergine.

The Fountain of Bellerophon was executed in the 17th century by Cosimo Fanzago.

=== Museums ===
- National Gallery of Selachoidei, housing one of the largest collections of cartilaginous fishes in Italy.
- Museum of Art (MdAO – Museo d'Arte)
- Museum of the Cathedral and the Diocese of Avellino
- Provincial Archaeological Museum
- Provincial Art Gallery, in the "Carcere Borbonico"
- Zoological Museum of invertebrates "L. Carbone"

== Economy ==
The 1980 Irpinia earthquake represented a turning point for the town and for the entire province of Avellino. Large amounts of money flowed in for infrastructure investment, and the extra money generated innovation and economic expansion more generally. By 2008 a per capita annual income level of €20,180 placed Avellino well above the regional average in terms of individual prosperity.

=== Agriculture ===
Agriculture was at the heart of Avellino's economy until the mid-1970s, since then many younger people have moved away from family farms, and sometimes also migrated away from the area, in pursuit of higher wages. Nevertheless, tobacco, viticulture and especially the production of hazelnuts remain important to the local economy and, with increased investment in recent years, employ a number of people.

=== Industry ===
The manufacturing sector plays an important role in Avellino, with two industrial zones on the eastern and western peripheries of the main urban area, at Pianodardine suburb, Montefredane, Prata di Principato Ultra and Pratola Serra. Many small and medium-sized businesses are located in the industrial zones, including notably FMA (Fabbrica Motori Automobilistici, Automobile Engine Factory) who produces Fiat Pratola Serra modular engines for Fiat, Opel, Jeep, Lancia and Alfa Romeo, and creator of the "multi-jet" (fuel injected) car engine.

== Transport ==
=== Air ===
The nearest airports are those of Salerno-Pontecagnano, 51 kilometres (32 mi) to the southwest and Napoli-Capodichino, 53 kilometres (33 mi) to the west.

=== Rail ===
The station, located where the city limits of Avellino meet Atripalda, was once the terminus for passenger rail services to Benevento, Cancello, and Rocchetta Sant'Antonio. The station provided a reliable link with Benevento and Salerno. A few long-distance trains to Naples and Rome were also added to try to reinvigorate the local economy, but these services came to an end in 2010, following cuts that saw the closure of the railway between Avellino and Rocchetta Sant'Antonio. A regional decree dated 9 August 2012 forced the closure of the remaining 19 local rail services. However, in response to protests from rail users a small number of services were reinstated on 28 October 2012.

=== Road ===
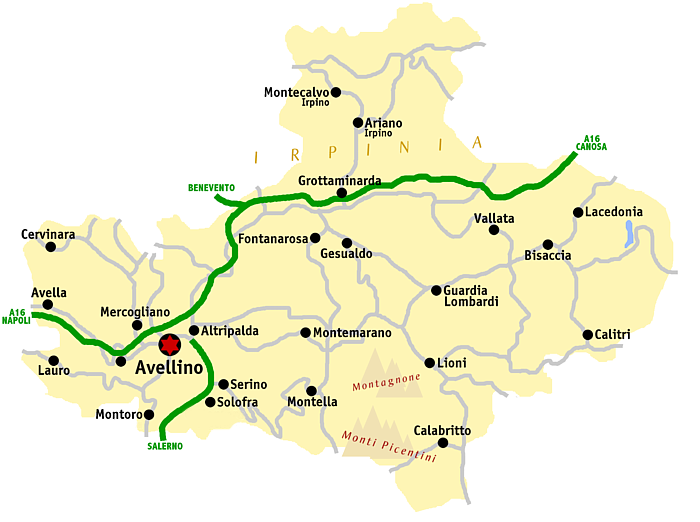

Avellino is served by two access points (Avellino Est/East and Avellino Ovest/West) on the A16 Autostrada (originally numbered A17, and known also as "Autostrada of the two seas") which runs approximately west–east and links Naples to the west with Canosa di Puglia and Bari on the farther side of the country. Near Naples the A16 connects with the A3 Autostrada, ensuring good road access with the principal population centres across Italy. Also important is the so-called "Ofantina" superstrada (dual carriageway) linking with several locally important towns to the east and south, en route to Salerno.

=== Public transport ===
Public transportation in Avellino is provided by AIR Campania. Since 2023, the service includes trolleybuses (locally referred to, inaccurately, as the metropolitana leggera, or light metro), on a new trolleybus route that opened on 3 April 2023. A trolleybus system previously operated in Avellino from 1947 to 1973.

== Sport ==
- U.S. Avellino 1912, a football club based in the town
- S.S. Felice Scandone, a basketball club based in the town

== Notable people ==
- Sonia Aquino (1977 – ), actress
- Milly D'Abbraccio (1964 – ), pornographic film actress
- Luigi Di Maio (1986 – ), politician
- Carmine Biagio Gatti (1988 – ), footballer
- Carmen Giannattasio (1975 – ), operatic soprano
- Joe Grim (1881–1939), Italian American boxer
- Maurizio Lanzaro (1982 – ), footballer
- Antonio Maccanico (1924–2013), politician
- Gianfranco Rotondi (1960 – ), politician
- Ralph Sazio (1922–2008), Italian Canadian football player and coach
- Cesare Uva (1824–1886), painter
- Antonio Baccarini (1887–1971), merchant and chemist

== In popular culture ==
In the HBO television series The Sopranos, mob boss Tony Soprano has his family roots in Avellino. All four of Tony's grandparents emigrated from Avellino to the United States in the early 20th century. In the episode "In Camelot", Tony's uncle Corrado "Junior" Soprano claims "The whole village of Avellino settled in this area" in which the main characters live, in Essex County, New Jersey.

== See also ==
- Avellino railway station
- Irpinia
- S.S. Felice Scandone, the town's basketball club, currently in Lega Basket Serie A
- Stadio Partenio-Adriano Lombardi
- U.S. Avellino 1912, the town's football club, currently in Serie C

== Sources ==
- Galasso, Giampiero (1992). Avellino. Storia e immagini. De Angelis.
