= Gerolamo Olivieri =

Italian Roman Catholic prelate

Most Reverend Gerolamo Olivieri
- Church: Catholic Church
- Diocese: Diocese of Acerno
- In office: 1525–1539
- Predecessor: Pompeo Colonna
- Successor: Francisco de Quiñones

Personal details
- Died: 1539 Acerno, Italy

Gerolamo Olivieri (died 1539) was a Roman Catholic prelate who served as Bishop of Acerno (1525–1539).

On 23 June 1525, he was appointed during the papacy of Pope Clement VII as Bishop of Acerno. He served as Bishop of Acerno until his death in 1539.

== External links and additional sources ==
- Cheney, David M. "Diocese of Acerno". Catholic-Hierarchy.org. (for Chronology of Bishops) ^{[self-published]}
- Chow, Gabriel. "Diocese of Acerno". GCatholic.org. (for Chronology of Bishops) ^{[self-published]}

Catholic Church titles
Preceded by Pompeo Colonna	Bishop of Acerno; 1525–1539	Succeeded by Francisco de Quiñones
