= Scipio Carocci =

17th-century Catholic bishop

Most Reverend Scipio Carocci
- Bishop of Acerno
- Church: Catholic Church
- Diocese: Diocese of Acerno
- In office: 1696–1702
- Predecessor: Francesco Sifola
- Successor: Nicolaus Ventriglia

Orders
- Consecration: 21 December 1696 by Sebastiano Antonio Tanara

Personal details
- Born: 22 April 1649 Gaete
- Died: June 1702 (age 53) Acerno, Italy

Scipio Carocci or Scipio Carocius (1649–1702) was a Roman Catholic prelate who served as Bishop of Acerno (1696–1702).

== Biography ==
Scipio Carocci was born in Gaete on 22 April 1649. On 17 December 1696, he was appointed during the papacy of Pope Innocent XII as Bishop of Acerno. On 21 December 1696, he was consecrated bishop by Sebastiano Antonio Tanara, Cardinal-Priest of Santi Quattro Coronati, with Prospero Bottini, Titular Archbishop of Myra, and Giorgio Spinola, Bishop of Albenga, serving as co-consecrators. He served as Bishop of Acerno until his death in June 1702.

== External links and additional sources ==
- Cheney, David M. "Diocese of Acerno". Catholic-Hierarchy.org. (for Chronology of Bishops) ^{[self-published]}
- Chow, Gabriel. "Diocese of Acerno". GCatholic.org. (for Chronology of Bishops) ^{[self-published]}

Catholic Church titles
Preceded by Francesco Sifola	Bishop of Acerno; 1696–1702	Succeeded by Nicolaus Ventriglia
