= Ludovigo Galbiati =

Italian Roman Chatolic bishop and prelate

Most Reverend Ludovicus Galbiati
- Bishop of Acerno
- Church: Catholic Church
- Diocese: Diocese of Acerno
- In office: 1637–1638
- Predecessor: Juan Serrano Ortiz
- Successor: Pietro Paolo Bonsi

Orders
- Consecration: 6 September 1637 by Alessandro Cesarini (iuniore)

Personal details
- Born: 1577 Rome, Italy
- Died: 23 May 1638 (age 61) Acerno, Italy

Ludovigo Galbiati or Ludovicus Galbiati (1577 – 23 May 1638) was a Roman Catholic prelate who served as Bishop of Acerno (1637–1638).

== Biography ==
Ludovicus Galbiati was born in Rome, Italy in 1577. On 17 August 1637, he was appointed during the papacy of Pope Urban VIII as Bishop of Acerno. On 6 September 1637, he was consecrated bishop by Alessandro Cesarini (iuniore), Cardinal-Deacon of Santa Maria in Cosmedin, with Alfonso Gonzaga, Titular Archbishop of Rhodus, and Giovanni Battista Scanaroli, Titular Bishop of Sidon, serving as co-consecrators. He served as Bishop of Acerno until his death on 23 May 1638.

== External links and additional sources ==
- Cheney, David M. "Diocese of Acerno". Catholic-Hierarchy.org. (for Chronology of Bishops) ^{[self-published]}
- Chow, Gabriel. "Diocese of Acerno". GCatholic.org. (for Chronology of Bishops) ^{[self-published]}

Catholic Church titles
Preceded by Juan Serrano Ortiz	Bishop of Acerno; 1637–1638)	Succeeded by Pietro Paolo Bonsi
