= Antonius Agellius =

Italian bishop

Most Reverend Antonio Agellio
- Bishop of Acerno
- Church: Catholic Church
- Diocese: Diocese of Acerno
- In office: 1593–1604
- Predecessor: Giovanni Francesco Orefice
- Successor: Paolo Manara

Personal details
- Born: 1532
- Died: 19 Nov 1608 (age 76) Rome, Italy

Antonius Agellius, C.R. or Antonio Agellio (1532–1608) was bishop of Acerno and a member of the Theatines, born in Sorrento. He was an editor of the Clementine edition of the Latin Vulgate.

== Biography ==
Antonius Agellius was born at Sorrento, in the year 1532. When nineteen years of age he put on the habit of his order, and in the following year, 1552, made his profession in Venice, where he had passed his novitiate. Having displayed singular ability in the study of theology and languages, he was sent by the superiors of his order to Rome, and placed under the tuition of the celebrated Gugliemo Sirleto, who at that time superintended the theological studies of the young members. Here he speedily distinguished himself, and became thoroughly versed in the Latin, Greek, Hebrew, and Chaldee languages. On the introduction of his order into Genoa, he was chosen the first preposito, in 1572, in the Casa di S. Maddalena, which office he held for three years. The Council of Trent having recommended a revision of the Sacred Scriptures, Agelli was one of the learned men selected by Pius V to whom this important work was confided. Their attention was first directed to the Septuagint version, on which Agelli was principally employed, and for which he collated a vast number of Hebrew and Greek manuscripts. This revised version was afterwards published at Rome, in 1587, in folio. He likewise had a great share in the Latin version of the Septuagint published by Flaminio de' Nobili, in 1588, in folio; and aided much in the completion of the correction of the Vulgate published in 1592, in folio. He was also one of the six persons, called scolastici, who presided over the Vatican press, and examined the works to be printed there, by comparing them with good manuscripts. In midst of these literary labours he performed the duties of visitor in Rome and Naples, and the other places comprised within this district. Clement VIII held him in such high esteem, that he entrusted to him the education of his grand nephew, Ippolito Aldobrandini, made him consultore of the Congregation of the Index, and in the year 1593 bishop of Acerno, in the Campagna Felice. This dignity he retained until the year 1604, when, the service of the Church requiring his constant residence in Rome, he resigned his bishopric, receiving from Pope for his maintenance an abbey, and apartments in the episcopal palace at Rome. Here he died in the year 1608.

== Works ==
In addition to his editorial labours mentioned above, he wrote the following works, which are described by Ughelli as most accurate, copious, and valuable:

1. Commentarium in Lamentationes Hieremiæ ex Auctoribus Græcis collectum, cum Explicatione e Catena Græcorum Patrum ex ejusdem Versione. Romæ, 1585, 4to.
2. Agelli, Antonio (1597). In Habacuc Prophetam. Antverpiæ – via ex Officina Plantiniana, apud Ioannem Moretum.
3. Agelli, Antonius (1606). Commentarii in Psalmos et in Divini Officii Cantica. Romæ – via typographia Vaticana. It is said that Cardinal Bellarmine, who had written upon the Psalms, declared, in allusion to the commentaries of Agelli, that he never would have published his own work, unless compelled so to do by the general of his order, as Agelli had forestalled all the praise and carried off the palm of honour.
4. In Proverbia Salomonis Commentarius, published by Novarini in his Varia Opuscula, Veronæ, 1649, fol. Part III, p. 109.
5. Cyrilli Alexandrini Libri XVII de Adoratione in Spiritu et Veritate, e Græco in Latinum translati et Scholiis illustrati. Romæ, 1588, folio.
6. Cyrilli Alexandrini adversus Nestorii Blasphemias Contradictionum Libri V, e Græco in Latinum translati, cum Scholiis. Romæ, 1607, fol. This work of Cyril of Alexandria had never before been published.
7. Procli Patriarchæ Constantinopolitani Epistola de Fide ad Armenos Agellio interprete, published in vol. XI of the Bibliotheca Patrum, Paris, 1654, fol.

In addition to the above, the following works are preserved in manuscript in the Quirinal Library of the Regular Clerks:

1. Opusculum de Ponderibus et Mensuris.
2. In Isaiam Prophetam à cap XXI ad finem.
3. In Danielem Expositio.
4. In Duodecim Prophetas Expositiones.
5. In Epistolas Pauli et Catholicas Annotationes, Græce et Latine.
6. In Tria Priora Capita Apocalypsis.
7. Selecta ex Rabbinorum Commentariis in Job.
8. Rabbi Bravatellus in Habacuc, Latine.
9. Scholia in Dionysium Areopagitam, Græce.
10. Phraseologia Demosthenis et Nazianzeni, Græce.

He likewise assisted Mario Altieri in the correction of the Gallican Psalter, and by order of Clement VIII made a strict criticism of the Talmud. Neither the corrections nor criticism have been published.

== Bibliography ==
- Jones, John Winter (1842). "Agelli, or Ajelli, Antonio". The Biographical Dictionary of the Society for the Diffusion of Useful Knowledge. Vol. 1 Part 2. London: Longman, Brown, Green, and Longmans.
- Ghilini, Girolamo (1647). Teatro d'Huomini Letterati (in Italian). Vol. II. Venice: Guerigli. p. 23.
- Ughelli, Ferdinando (1721). Italia Sacra (in Latin). Vol. VII. Venice: Sebastiano Coleti. p. 450.

== External links and additional sources ==
- Cheney, David M. "Diocese of Acerno". Catholic-Hierarchy.org. (for Chronology of Bishops) ^{[self-published]}
- Chow, Gabriel. "Diocese of Acerno". GCatholic.org. (for Chronology of Bishops) ^{[self-published]}

Catholic Church titles
Preceded by Giovanni Francesco Orefice	Bishop of Acerno; 1593–1604	Succeeded by Paolo Manara
