= Paolo Manara =

Italian Roman Catholic priest (1544–1611)

Most Reverend Paolo Manara
- Bishop of Acerno
- Church: Catholic Church
- Diocese: Diocese of Acerno
- In office: 1604–1611
- Predecessor: Antonio Agelli
- Successor: Francesco Solimele

Orders
- Consecration: Girolamo Bernerio by 14 November 1604

Personal details
- Born: 1544 Burgo Vallis Tasi Placentin
- Died: 1611 (aged 66–67) Acerno, Italy

Paolo Manara (1544–1611) was a Roman Catholic prelate who served as Bishop of Acerno (1604–1611).

== Biography ==
Paolo Manara was ordained a priest in the Order of Preachers. On 20 October 1604, he was appointed during the papacy of Pope Clement VIII as Bishop of Acerno. On 14 November 1604, he was consecrated bishop by Girolamo Bernerio, Cardinal-Bishop of Albano, with Agostino Quinzio, Bishop of Korčula, and Lazaro Pellizzari, Bishop of Nusco, serving as co-consecrators. He served as Bishop of Acerno until his death in 1611.

== External links and additional sources ==
- Cheney, David M. "Diocese of Acerno". Catholic-Hierarchy.org. (for Chronology of Bishops) ^{[self-published]}
- Chow, Gabriel. "Diocese of Acerno". GCatholic.org. (for Chronology of Bishops) ^{[self-published]}

Catholic Church titles
Preceded by Antonio Agelli	Bishop of Acerno; 1604–1611	Succeeded by Francesco Solimele
