= Gaete (disambiguation) =

Gaete may refer to:

In geography:

- Gaete, a hamlet in the Dutch province of North Brabant.
- Gaeta, a city and comune in the province of Latina, in Lazio, central Italy

In history:

- Gaete (people), ancient European people, also known as Dacians or Getae

In other uses:

- Eliana Gaete, a Chilean athlete
