= Acerno Cathedral =

Cathedral in Acerno, Campania, Italy

Coordinates: 40.7422°N 15.0543°E

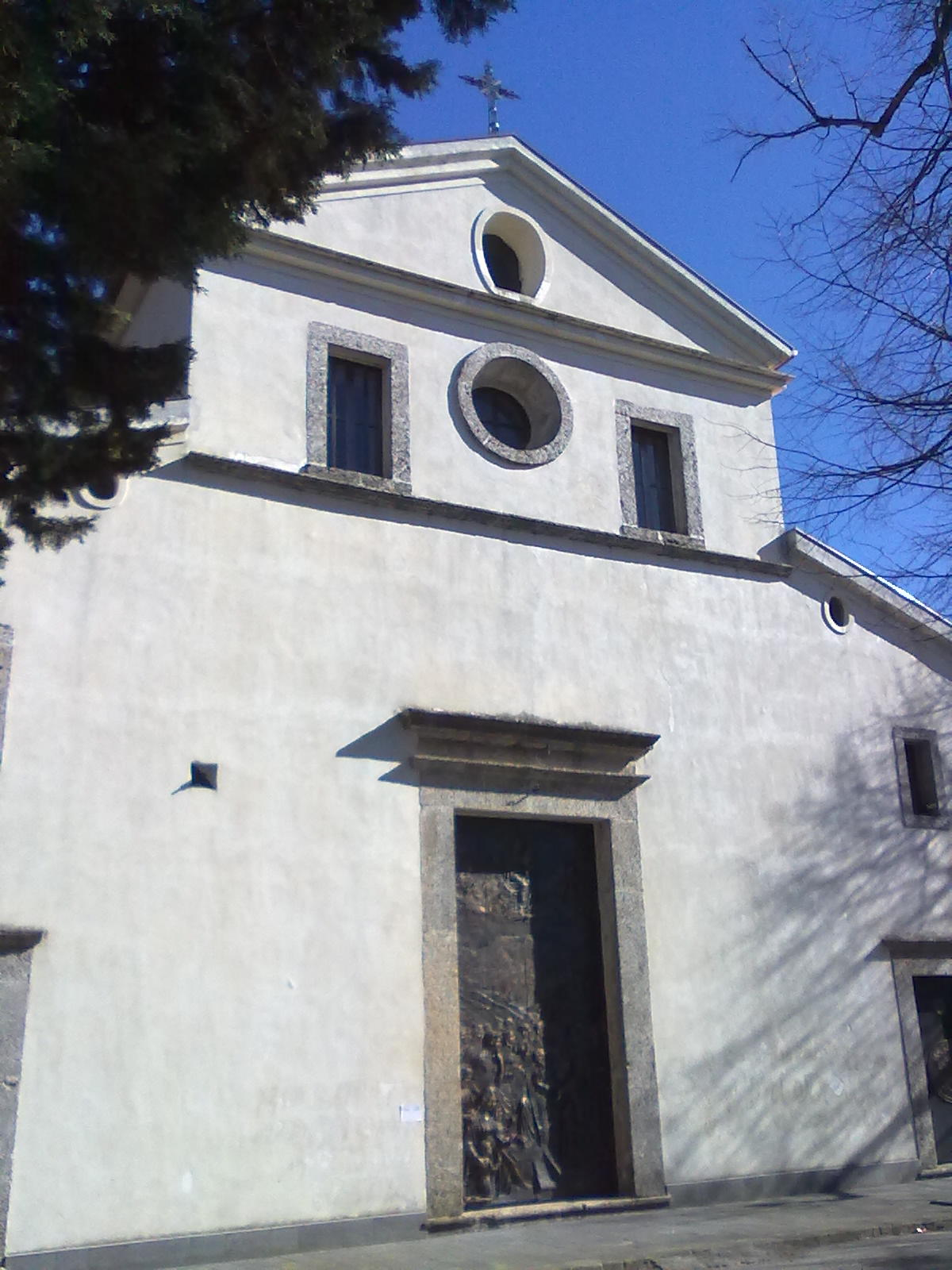
West front

Acerno Cathedral (Duomo di Acerno, Concattedrale di San Donato) is a Roman Catholic cathedral, dedicated to Saint Donatus of Arezzo, in the town of Acerno in Campania, Italy.

From the 11th century it was the seat of the Bishop of Acerno. The bishopric was united to the Archbishopric of Salerno in 1818 to form the Archdiocese of Salerno-Acerno, renamed in 1986 the Archdiocese of Salerno-Campagna-Acerno, in which Acerno Cathedral is a co-cathedral.

== History ==
Location of Acerno Cathedral

Construction of the present building began in 1575 on the ruins of an earlier church which was declared the cathedral of the diocese of Acerno in 444 by Pope Leo I. As a consequence of many earthquakes, in particular that of 1980 and the fire that followed it, the structure has undergone numerous changes. As a result of a reconstruction project in 1989 the building has been completely restored and reopened for worship.

== Internal structure ==
The interior, on a Latin cross floorplan, consists of a central nave and two side-aisles, a transept, an apse and a sacristy, as well as the usual service areas.

Because of the recent destruction no reliefs or decorative works are now to be seen, except for some 18th-century frescoes attributed to Leonardo Pallante and the high altar.

== External structure ==
As for the building's exterior, the very plain west front has a principal central doorway between two smaller ones, above which are two windows to either side of a small central rose window beneath a simple Classical pediment containing an oculus. The bell tower has four storeys and terminates in an onion dome with a metal shell.

== Sources and external links ==
- GCatholic.org: Archdiocese of Salerno-Campagna-Acerno
- Catholic Hierarchy: Diocese of Acerno
