= Diocese of Acerno =

Coordinates: 40.7421°N 15.0543°E

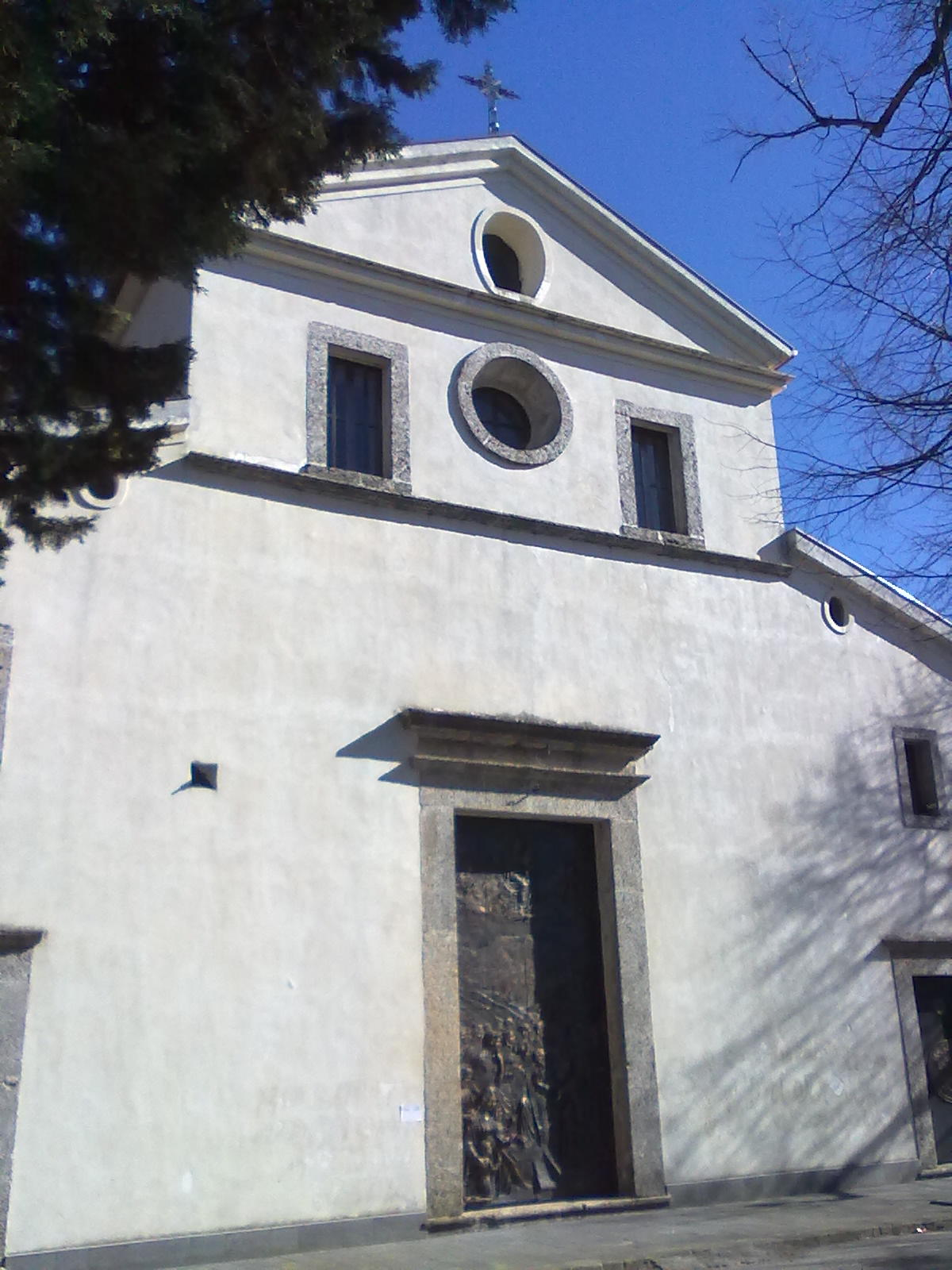
Co-Cathedral of St. Donatus Acerno, Salerno, Italy

The Diocese of Acerno was a Roman Catholic diocese based in Acerno, a distance of 68 km (42 mi.) from Naples in southern Italy, with the bishop's seat in Acerno Cathedral. Created in the 11th century, in 1818, the diocese was granted in perpetual administratorship to the archbishops of Salerno. In the reorganization of ecclesiastical provinces in 1986, Acerno was suppressed, to create the Archdiocese of Salerno-Campagna-Acerno.

== History ==
The cathedral of Acerno was originally dedicated in honor of S. Peter, but, like nearly all the cathedrals in the kingdom of Naples, came to be dedicated as well to the Virgin Mary, in this case under the title of the Annunciation. The cathedral was administered by a Chapter, which was led by four dignities, the Archdeacon, the Primicerius, the Treasurer, and the Cantor; the office of Cantor later disappeared. The original number of canons is uncertain, but by 1792 they numbered eighteen.

Bishop Giovanni Serrano, O.F.M.Observ., held a diocesan synod in Acerno in 1626, announcing at the Vatican during his ad limina visit in 1626 that he did not contemplate holding another.

In 1792, the town of Acerno had a population of around 2,000 people. In the town was one religious house of men, the Conventual Franciscans. The bishop preferred to reside in Monte Corvino, some 19 km to the southwest. In the town of Picenzia, an area of some 600 families, there was a collegiate church dedicated to S. Peter, which was headed by an Archpriest, a Primicerius, and a Treasurer, with two chaplains.

In May 1805, Napoleon had himself crowned King of Italy. After the Battle of Austerlitz on 2 December, a French army was sent to occupy the kingdom of Naples. On 23 January 1806, Ferdinand IV fled to Sicily, and on 14 February the French occupied Naples. Napoleon's brother, Joseph Bonaparte, was declared king on 30 March 1806, and after he was transferred to Spain, General Joachim Murat was declared King of Naples on 1 August 1808. In 1809, France annexed the Papal States, and Pope Pius VII was deported. Under such conditions, neither nomination to vacant dioceses by the king, nor confirmation by the pope, took place.

=== After Napoleon ===
Following the extinction of the Napoleonic Kingdom of Italy, the Congress of Vienna authorized the restoration of the Papal States and the Kingdom of Naples. Since the French occupation had seen the abolition of many Church institutions in the Kingdom, as well as the confiscation of most Church property and resources, it was imperative that Pope Pius VII and King Ferdinand IV reach agreement on restoration and restitution.

A concordat was finally signed on 16 February 1818, and ratified by Pius VII on 25 February 1818. Ferdinand issued the concordat as a law on 21 March 1818. The re-erection of the dioceses of the kingdom and the ecclesiastical provinces took more than three years. The right of the king to nominate the candidate for a vacant bishopric was recognized, as in the Concordat of 1741, subject to papal confirmation (preconisation). On 27 June 1818, Pius VII issued the bull De Ulteriore, in which he reestablished the metropolitan archbishopric of Salerno, with five suffragan dioceses, the diocese of Capaccio e Vallo, diocese of Policastro, diocese of Potenza e Marsico Nuovo, and diocese of Nusco.

The See of Acerno was granted to the archbishop of Salerno as its perpetual administrator. In 1920, the diocese of Acerno had seven parishes, seven churches, and sixteen secular priests.

On 4 August 1973, the Archbishop of Salerno and Perpetual Administrator of the diocese of Acerno, Gaetano Pollio (1969-1984) was also named bishop of Campagna, thereby serving as bishop of three dioceses at one and the same time, aeque personaliter.

=== Diocesan reorganization ===
The Second Vatican Council (1962–1965), in order to ensure that all Catholics received proper spiritual attention, decreed the reorganization of the diocesan structure of Italy and the consolidation of small and struggling dioceses. It also recommended the abolition of anomalous units such as exempt territorial prelatures.

On 18 February 1984, the Vatican and the Italian State signed a new and revised concordat. Based on the revisions, a set of Normae was issued on 15 November 1984, which was accompanied in the next year, on 3 June 1985, by enabling legislation. According to the agreement, the practice of having one bishop govern two separate dioceses at the same time, aeque personaliter, as was the case with Salerno and Acerno and Campagna, was to be abolished. Instead, the Vatican continued consultations which had begun under Pope John XXIII for the merging of small dioceses, especially those with personnel and financial problems, into one combined diocese. On 30 September 1986, Pope John Paul II ordered that the dioceses of Salerno and Aceno, as well as the diocese of Campagna (which had not been incorporated into the reorganized metropolitanate of Conza), be merged into one diocese with one bishop, with the Latin title Archidioecesis Salernitana-Campaniensis-Acernensis. The seat of the diocese was to be in Salerno, and the cathedral of S. Maria e S. Matteo in Salerno was to serve as the cathedral of the merged dioceses. The cathedral in Acerno and the cathedral in Campagna were to become co-cathedrals, and the cathedral Chapters of Acerno and of Campagna were each to be a Capitulum Concathedralis. There was to be only one diocesan Tribunal, in Salerno, and likewise one seminary, one College of Consultors, and one Priests' Council. The territory of the new diocese was to include the territory of the previous dioceses of Salerno, Acerna, and Campagna.

== Bishops of Acerno ==
=== to 1500 ===
- Mirando (attested 1091 or 1106)
- Giusio (1114–1124)
- Pisanus (attested 1136)
- Petrus (attested 1179)
- Paulus (attested 1222)
- Nicola da S. Germano, O.S.B. (1228 – May 1258)
- Luca, O.F.M. (attested August 1274 – 1279)
- Giacomo (attested 1295)
- Andrea Capograsso (1309–1319)

Bartolomeo (attributed to 1314)

- Giordano di Miramonti, O.P. (25 May 1319 - 1331)
- Petrus, O.Min. (1331–1344)
- Giacomo II (1344–1348)
- Matteo de Marino (1349–1363)
- Giuliano, O.F.M. (1363–1371)
- Roberto da Casalnuovo, O.F.M. (11 August 1371)
- Tommaso (1383) Avignon Obedience
- Benedetto da Ascoli, O.E.S.A. (1389–1396) Avignon Obedience
- Pacello da Salerno, O.F.M. (1396–1405)
- Manfredo da Aversa (10 July 1405 - 1415)
- Antonello Syrraca (Antonio Sirico) (20 March 1415 - 1436)
- Nicolas Solimele (1436-1459)
- Paracleto Malvezzi (de Malvitiis) (1460-1487)
- Menelao Gennari (13 August 1487 - 1493 Appointed, Archbishop of Sorrento)
- Antonio Bonito (19 March 1494 - 1510)

=== 1500 to 1818 ===
[Pietro da Arezzo (1511)]

- Dalmazio Queralt (1512-1514)

[Alemanno (1514)]

- Luis Muñoz (1514–1523)
- Petrus (1523?–1524?)

Cardinal Pompeo Colonna (1524–1525) Apostolic Administrator

- Gerolimo Olivieri (1525-1539 resigned)

Cardinal Francisco de Quiñones (1539) Administrator

- Nicola Angelo Olivieri (1539–1566)
- Giovanni Matteo Valdina, O.P. (1566–1570)
- Lelio Giordano (1570–1580)
- Giovanni Francesco Orefice (1581-1593)
- Antonio Agelli, C.R. (24 November 1593 - 1604)
- Paolo Manara, O.P. (1604-1610)
- Francesco Solimele (1611-1613)
- Juan Serrano Ortiz, O.F.M. (1613-1637)
- Ludovico Galbiati (1637–1638)
- Pietro Paolo Bonsi (1638-1642)
- Clemente Confetti (13 April 1643 - 1644)
- Camillo Ragona (1644-1665)
- Antonio Glielmi (15 June 1665 - 1690)
- Francesco Sifola, C.R. (O.Theat.) (1690-1696)
- Scipio Carocci (1696-1702)
- Nicola Ventriglia (1703-1708)

Sede vacante (1708–1718)

- Domenico Antonio Menafra (1718-1738)
- Domnenico Anelli (1739-1743)
- Geronimo Lorenzi (1743-1790)
- Michelangelo Calandrelli, O.E.S.A. (1792-1797)
- Giuseppe Mancusi (1797-1807)

On 27 June 1818, the administration of the diocese of Acerno was assigned to the archbishop of Salerno, in perpetuity.

== Books ==
- Eubel, Conradus (1890), "Die Bischöfe, Cardinale und Päpste aus dem Minoritenorden," (in German), in: Römische Quartalschrift für Christliche Altertumskunde 4 (1890), pp. 185–258.
- Eubel, Conradus, ed. (1913). Hierarchia catholica (in Latin). Vol. Tomus 1 (second ed.). Münster: Libreria Regensbergiana.
- Eubel, Conradus, ed. (1914). Hierarchia catholica (in Latin). Vol. Tomus 2 (second ed.). Münster: Libreria Regensbergiana.
- Eubel, Conradus; Gulik, Guilelmus (1923). Hierarchia catholica (in Latin). Vol. 3 (second ed.). Münster: Libreria Regensbergiana.
- Gams, Pius Bonifatius (1873). Series episcoporum Ecclesiae catholicae: quotquot innotuerunt a beato Petro apostolo (in Latin). Ratisbon: Typis et Sumptibus Georgii Josephi Manz. p. 844.
- Gauchat, Patritius (Patrice) (1935). Hierarchia catholica (in Latin). Vol. IV (1592-1667). Münster: Libraria Regensbergiana.
- Ritzler, Remigius; Sefrin, Pirminus (1952). Hierarchia catholica medii et recentis aevi (in Latin). Vol. V (1667-1730). Patavii: Messagero di S. Antonio.
- Ritzler, Remigius; Sefrin, Pirminus (1958). Hierarchia catholica medii et recentis aevi (in Latin). Vol. VI (1730-1799). Patavii: Messagero di S. Antonio.

=== Studies ===
- Cappelletti, Giuseppe (1870). Le chiese d'Italia: dalla loro origine sino ai nostri giorni (in Italian). Vol. vigesimo (20). Venezia: G. Antonelli. pp. 314–319.
- D'Avino, Vincenzio (1848). Cenni storici sulle chiese arcivescovili, vescovili, e prelatizie (nullius) del regno delle due Sicilie (in Italian). Naples: dalle stampe di Ranucci. pp. 600–601. [article written by Giuseppe Paesano].
- Kehr, Paul Fridolin (1935). Italia pontificia. Vol. VIII: Regnum Normannorum — Campania. Berlin: Weidmann. (in Latin) pp. 333–366.
- Lanzoni, Francesco (1927). Le diocesi d'Italia dalle origini al principio del secolo VII (an. 604). (in Italian) Faenza: F. Lega, pp. 250–252.
- Torelli, Felice (1848). La chiave del Concordato dell'anno 1818 e degli atti emanati posteriormente al medesimo. (in Italian) Volume 1, second edition Naples: Stamperia del Fibreno, 1848.
- Ughelli, Ferdinando; Coleti, NIccolo (1721). Italia sacra sive De episcopis Italiæ, et insularum adjacentium (in Latin). Vol. Tomus septimus (7). Venice: apud Sebastianum Coleti. pp. 445–451.

==== External links ====
- Diocese of Salerno website: list of bishops (in Italian)
