= Luigi Novarini =

Italian theologian and writer (1594–1656)

The Reverend Luigi Novarini
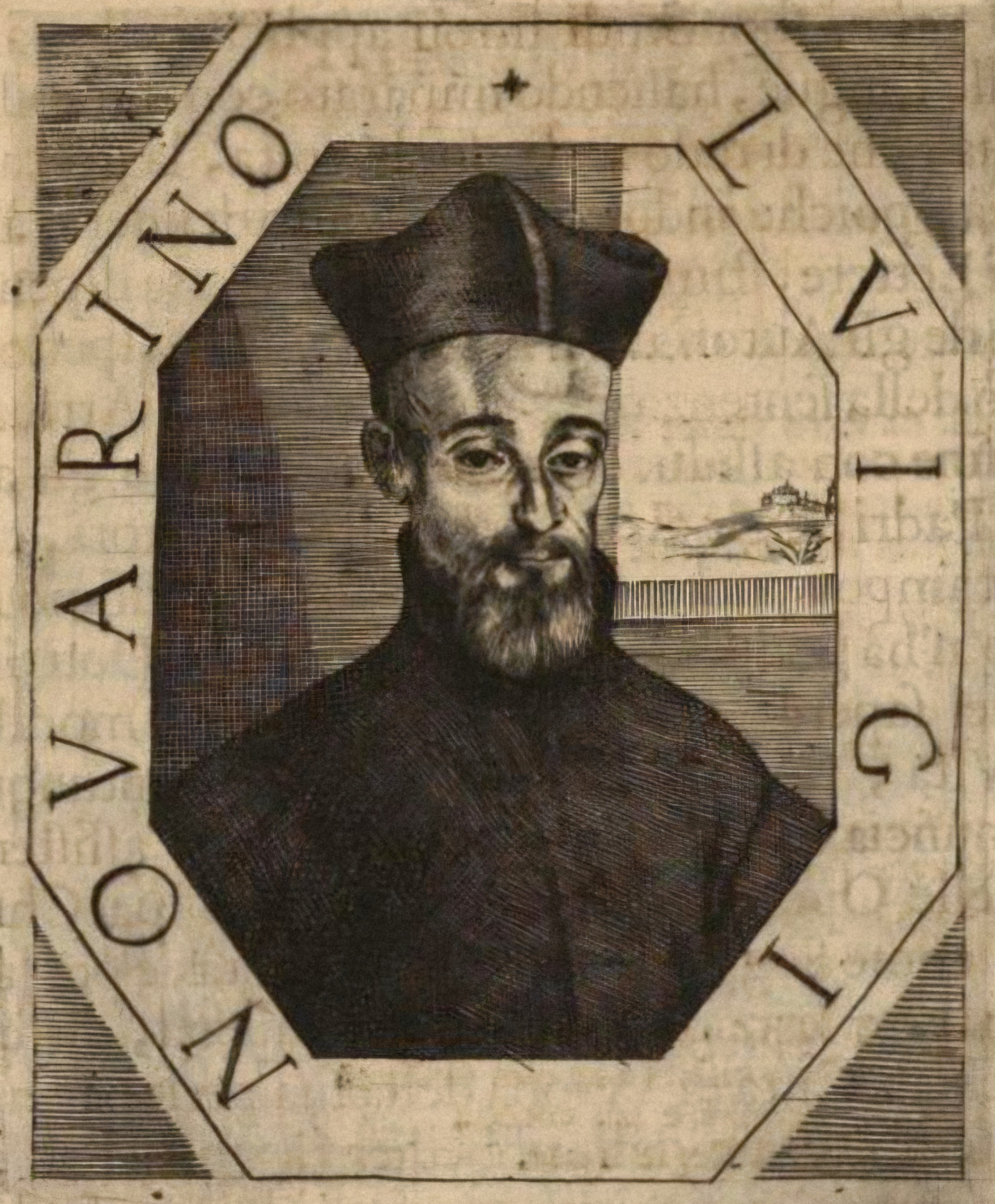
- Engraved portrait of Luigi Novarini from Lorenzo Crasso's Elogii d'huomini letterati, Venice, Combi & La Noù, 1666
- Born: Girolamo Novarini; 1594; Verona, Republic of Venice
- Died: 14 January 1650 (aged 55–56); Verona, Republic of Venice
- Occupations: Theologian; Scholar; Philosopher
- Parent: Angelo Novarini

Academic work
- Era: Late Renaissance
- Discipline: Biblical scholar, Ancient Near Eastern Linguist

Luigi Novarini (Italian: [luˈiːdʒi nuˈ(ʋ)aːriːni]; 1594 – 14 January 1650) was an Italian theologian and scholar.

== Biography ==
Luigi Novarini was born at Verona in 1594. He received at baptism the name of Girolamo, which he changed to that of Luigi when he took, in 1612, the garb of the Theatines. After having studied theology and entered the priesthood at Venice, he returned to his native city, where he occupied different positions in his order. He was well skilled in the Greek, Hebrew, and Syriac languages, and enjoyed the esteem of the princes and learned men of his time. He died at Verona in 1650. Of his value as a writer, Nicéron says: "His natural vivacity would not allow him to polish his productions; he placed indiscriminately upon paper all that he found in his collections upon the subject of which he was treating, whether good or bad; the desire of using all he had gathered often caused him to make digressions, which only served to swell his books. He also thought more of making large and numerous works than of composing good ones."

== Works ==
Most noteworthy of his works are:

- Electa sacra (Venice, Lyon, and Verona, 1627-1645, 5 vols. fol.). Vol. II, which, in a diffuse and mystical style, contains a eulogy of the Virgin, has had three editions;
- Risus sardonicus, hoc est deflecta mundi laetitia (Verona, 1630, 12mo);
- Schediasmata sacro-prophana (Lyon, 1635, fol.);
- Adagia ex SS. Patrum ecclesiasticorumque scriptorum monumentis prompta (ibid. 1637, 2 vols. fol.). According to Nicéron, vol. xl. p. 218 (who gives a list of twenty-seven of Novarini's works), each of the two volumes contains explanations of one thousand adages;
- Matthaeus, Marcus, Lucas, et Joananes expensi (ibid. 1642-1643, 3 vols. fol.): a series of moral commentaries upon the evangelists and the Acts of the Apostles;
- Paulus expensus (Verona, 1644, fol.);
- Omnium scientiarum anima, hoc est axiomata physio-theologica (Lyons, 1644, 3 vols. fol.);
- Moses expensus (Verona, 1646-1648, 2 vols. fol.);
- Encyclopaedia epistolaris (Venice, 1645, fol.);
- Admiranda orbis Christiani (ibid. 1680, 2 vols. fol.): this compilation, in which are found many fabulous things, has been edited by the care of J. B. Bagatta, a Theatine monk.
