= Francisco de Quiñones =

Spanish Franciscan friar and cardinal

His Eminence Francisco de Quiñones O.F.M.
- Cardinal-Priest of Santa Croce in Gerusalemme
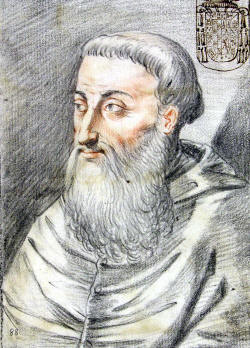
- Drawing of Cardinal Quiñones, 1527
- Church: Catholic Church
- Appointed: 25 September 1528
- Term ended: 5 November 1540
- Predecessor: Antonio Maria Ciocchi del Monte
- Successor: Marcello Cervini

Orders
- Created cardinal: 7 December 1527 by Pope Clement VII
- Rank: Cardinal-Priest

Personal details
- Born: 1475 León, Spain
- Died: 5 November 1540 (aged 64–65) Veroli, Papal States
- Coat of arms

Francisco de Quiñones, (Latin: Franciscus Cardinalis Quignonius) (also Francisco de los Ángeles) (ca. 1475 in Kingdom of León – 5 November 1540 in Veroli, Papal States) was a Spanish Franciscan friar and later cardinal who was responsible for some reforms in the Catholic Church in Spain.

== Early life ==
He was the son of Diego Fernandez de Quiñones, Count of Luna and was educated as a page of Francisco Jiménez de Cisneros. At the age of sixteen he entered the Order of Friars Minor at the friary of St. Mary of the Angels in Alcalá de Henares, taking the religious name Francis of the Angels (1498).

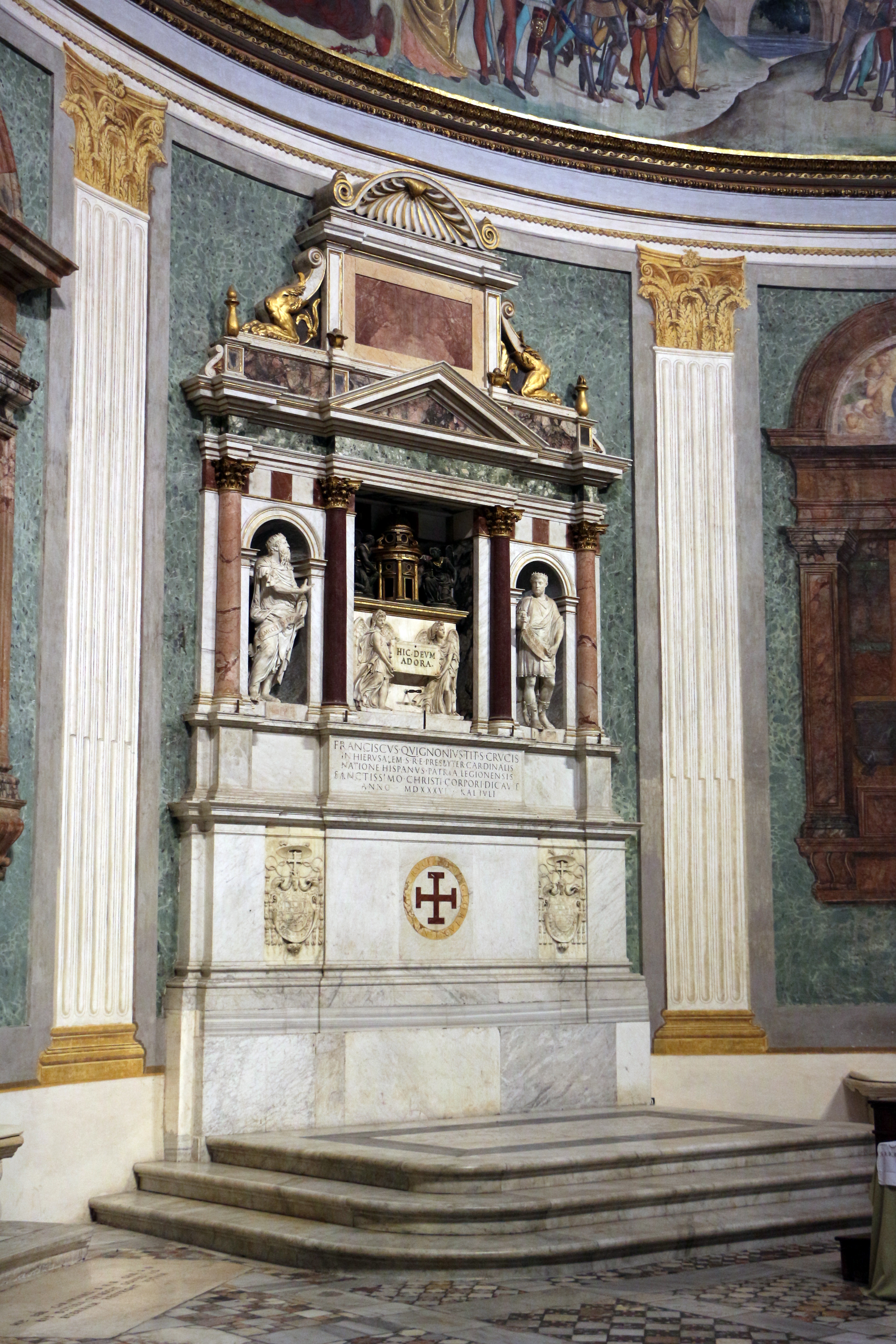
Tomb of Francisco de Quiñones by Jacopo Sansovino

Having completed his studies, he successively discharged various important offices of his Order as Custos, Commissary General, and Vicar General of the Observant branch of the Order. In 1521 he had obtained special permission and faculties from Pope Leo X to go to the missions in the Americas, together with Jean Glapion, confessor of Emperor Charles V. Glapion died in the same year, however, and Quiñones was elected Commissary General (1521–23) of the Franciscans north of the Alps ('Ultramontanes'). At the General Chapter of the Order held in Burgos in 1523, he was elected its Minister General, serving in the office until 1527.

== Minister General of the Franciscans ==
As Minister General, he undertook a visitation of the friaries in Spain (1523–25), as well as those of a great part of Italy and the Spanish Netherlands (1525–27). He promoted studies, maintained general discipline, and was active in promotion of the missions. In 1524 he sent twelve missionaries to Mexico, among them Juan Juárez, who later became the first bishop within the present territory of the United States.

After the sack of Rome in 1527 and the imprisonment of Pope Clement VII (May, 1527), Quiñones, who was distantly related to the Emperor, and was also his confidant, seemed the man best able to obtain the pope's release and ensure and a full reconciliation between pope and emperor. Quiñones was sent to the emperor for this purpose on three occasions, and his efforts were crowned with success when Pope Clement was freed (December, 1527), subsequently the Treaties of Barcelona (1528) and Cambrai (1529) were signed.

== Cardinal ==
As these activities rendered it impossible for Quiñones to govern the Order effectively, he renounced the office of Minister General in December 1527, and in September of the following year was created cardinal of the title of S. Croce in Gerusalemme, hence the name "Cardinal of the Holy Cross" by which he was sometimes called. From 1530 to 1533 he was also Bishop of Coria, in Spain, and for a short time, in 1539, held the post of administrator of the diocese of the diocese of Acerno, close to Naples in southern Italy, but he was never Cardinal Bishop of Palestrina, as some authors claim.

As a cardinal, Quiñones always occupied a distinguished position in the Sacred College and closely followed the movement of the Reformation in Germany. When Pope Paul III contemplated assembling a general Council at Mantua, in 1536 he sent Quiñones to Emperor Ferdinand I, King of the Romans and of Hungary, to promote the idea. However, Quiñones did not live to see the opening in 1545 of what became the Council of Trent. He died in 1540 at Veroli and his body was brought from there to Rome and buried in his titular church, Santa Croce in Gerusalemme, in a tomb which he himself had had prepared.

== Liturgical Reformer ==
Quiñones left some legislative compilations for his Order, but is best known for his attempted reform of the Roman Breviary undertaken by the order of Pope Clement. This he began in 1535 and it was issued in that year by Pope Paul III. A second recension followed in 1536. It was primarily intended for private use but (with permission) it began to be used in many religious houses and more than 100 editions were printed between 1536 and 1566. However, it was subject to much criticism for its disregard of tradition and Pope Paul IV banned its use in 1558.
