= Pompeo Colonna =

Italian noble (1479–1532)

His Eminence Pompeo Colonna
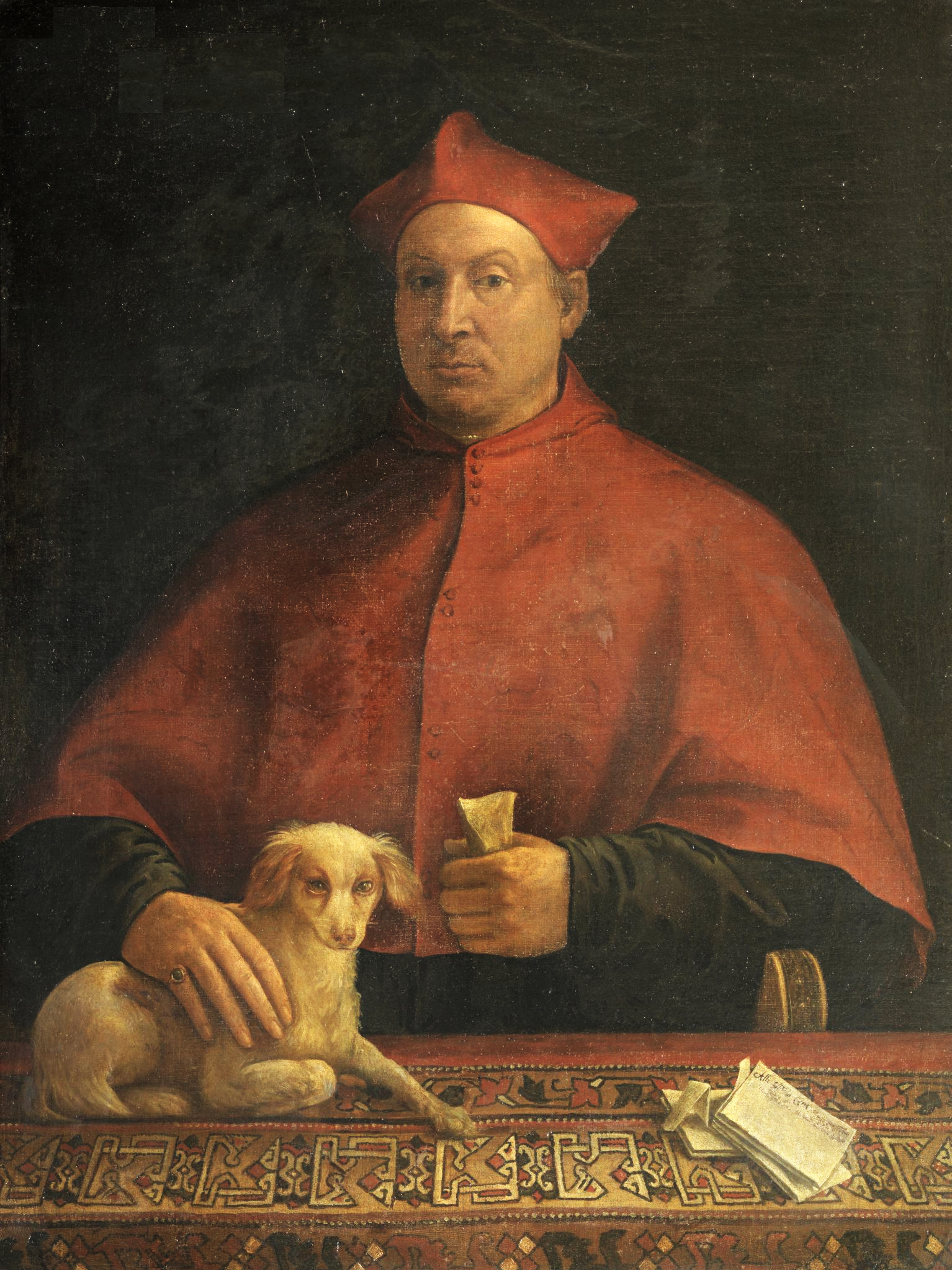
- Portrait by Sebastiano del Piombo, Galleria Colonna, Rome
- Diocese: Archbishop of Monreale
- Elected: 14 December 1530
- In office: 28 June 1532

Orders
- Created cardinal: 1 July 1517 by Leo X
- Rank: Cardinal Priest of San Lorenzo in Damaso (1524–1532)

Personal details
- Born: 12 May 1479 Rome
- Died: 28 June 1532 (aged 53) Naples
- Parents: Girolamo Colonna, Vittoria dei Conti di Pola

Pompeo Colonna (12 May 1479 – 28 June 1532) was an Italian noble, condottiero, politician, and cardinal. At the culmination of his career he was Viceroy of the Kingdom of Naples (1530–1532) for the Emperor Charles V. Born in Rome, he was the son of Girolamo Colonna, whose father Antonio was second Prince of Salerno; and Vittoria Conti, of the Conti de Poli. His family belonged to the highest rank of nobility both of the City of Rome and of the Kingdom of Naples. Pompeo and his family were hereditary supporters of the Holy Roman Empire (Ghibbelines), and they spent their careers fighting their hereditary enemies, the Orsini family, and defending and expanding their family territories and interests. He played a significant, if sometimes disruptive, role in the Conclaves of 1521 and 1523 on behalf of the Imperial interest. His family commitments and his conclave activities brought Pompeo into conflict with the second Medici pope, Clement VII, whose election he vigorously opposed, and made him a leading figure in the attempted overthrow of Pope Clement and the Sack of Rome in 1527.

== Early career ==
Pompeo's father was killed on 4 March 1482, when Pompeo was not yet three years old. Young Pompeo was given a rigorous upbringing at Monte Compatrum in the Tusculan hills east of Frascati, under the watchful eyes of his uncles Prospero and Cardinal Giovanni Colonna. He and his first-cousin Marcantonio Colonna, his friend and constant companion, were in constant rivalry with one another, especially in their enthusiasm for military affairs. In 1498, as a young man of eighteen, Pompeo fought alongside his uncle Prospero, Lord of Genazzano and Nemi, Duke of Traetto, Count of Fondi, against the traditional family enemies, the Orsini. His uncle took Pompeo to Naples after the Orsini affair was settled, and introduced the young man to King Federigo I, whose fast friend he quickly became. Pompeo later fought on behalf of the Spanish in several campaigns in 1503, culminating in the Battle of Garigliano (1503), in which Piero de' Medici, the elder brother of Giovanni de' Medici (Pope Leo X) was killed.

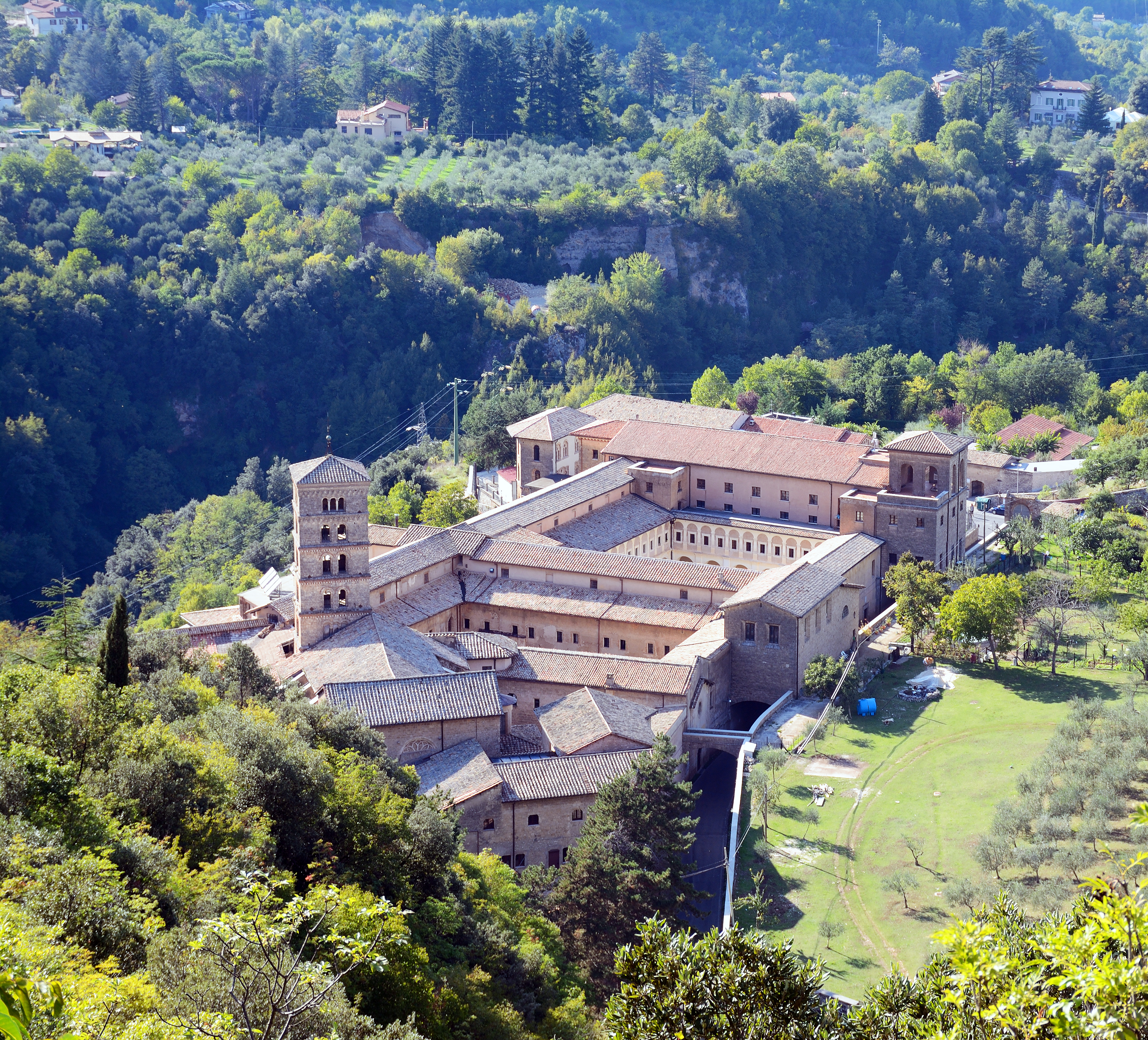
Abbey of Subiaco

It was decided by Pompeo's uncles that he should enter upon an ecclesiastical career, so that he could succeed to the rich benefices and powerful offices enjoyed by Cardinal Giovanni. He became the Cardinal's majordomo, apparently in 1504. With the cooperation of Pope Julius II, Pompeo was named Protonotary Apostolic in 1507. On the death of Cardinal Giovanni Colonna (26 September 1508) who had governed the See of Rieti since 1480, Pompeo was named bishop of Rieti by Pope Julius II on 6 October 1508. Pompeo ruled the diocese until he resigned in 1520 in favor of his nephew, Scipione Colonna. In 1520, just before his resignation, Cardinal Pompeo increased the number of Canons in the Cathedral of Rieti from twenty-eight to forty. The Cardinal was not a disinterested philanthropist, for, though he increased the numbers and prestige of the Canons, his nephew also gained twelve benefices which were at the disposal of the Bishop to reward Colonna followers. When Bishop Scipio Colonna resigned in 1528, Pompeo Colonna again became Bishop of Rieti, until he resigned in the next year in favor of his own secretary, Mario Aligeri. Pompeo Colonna was also abbot of Subiaco and Grottaferrata, again in succession to Giovanni Colonna; he was succeeded in 1513 by his nephew Scipione Colonna.

== Trouble with Pope Julius ==
In 1511, when rumours of the imminent death of Pope Julius II spread, Pompeo and Antonio Savelli spurred the Roman population to rebel against the Papal authority. Paolo Giovio points out that Pompeo was indignant because in the most recent Consistory for the creation of Cardinals, there was no Roman among the eight creations. To the surprise of all, however, the barons of Rome were able to reach an agreement among themselves on 28 August 1511, and a truce was even arranged between the Orsini and the Colonna. The nascent civil war was over. When the Pope recovered, having been informed of the revolt by his niece, the Duchess of Urbino, he did not look with pleasure on Bishop Pompeo Colonna, and he was condemned. He fled to his Abbey of Subiaco, while several of his fellow conspirators fled to France. He was offered a pardon by Julius II, but he refused it, since the pardon did not include reinstatement as Bishop of Rieti. Pompeo was so angry that he even threatened to join the French, who had seized Bologna earlier in the year, but his uncle Prospero firmly dissuaded him from such wild designs.

Pope Julius II died on Monday 21 February 1513 of a double tertian fever (malaria). Pompeo lost no time. He summoned all his friends to his Tusculan estates, and prepared his forces for a march on Rome. Both the Orsini and the Colonna factions entered the city on 22 February. Pompeo immediately made an attack on the house of Cardinal Antonio Maria Ciocchi del Monte, who had been made administrator of the Diocese of Rieti when Pompeo had been deposed in 1511, and on Mariano Cucini, an official of the Apostolic Camera, who had drawn up the information through which Pompeo had been condemned. Andrea della Valle undertook to work with the Senate of Rome to bring order back into the city, and managed to negotiate a truce between the Orsini and Colonna, and in particular with Pompeo, who was promised by the Senate that all would be made right if he would lay down his arms. His brother Fabrizio also intervened, and obtained a promise from Cardinal Ciocci del Monte that he would restore Pompeo's episcopal insignia. The Conclave of 1513 was able to proceed. The opening ceremonies took place in the Vatican Basilica on Friday 4 March, with twenty-five cardinals participating. On Friday 11 March the cardinals elected Giovanni de' Medici, who took the name Leo X.

== Leo X (Medici) (1513–1521) ==
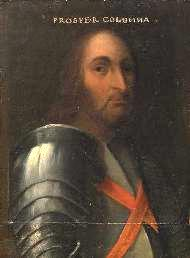
Prospero Colonna

Immediately after the Election Leo X received Pompeo Colonna and allowed him to kiss his foot. Pompeo was restored to all of his ecclesiastical functions. Leo also presented Pompeo and his brother Fabrizio with a house and gardens which Julius II had built on land which he had confiscated from the Colonna. Having been reconciled with the Papacy, Pompeo spent the next two years in the city and at the Papal Court, enjoying the favor of Leo X.

Pompeo Colonna, Bishop of Rieti, participated in the V Lateran Council, and at the Seventh Plenary Session on 27 June 1513, read out Pope Leo's memorandum on the work of the council, and also announced the postponement of the next Plenary Session until 16 November, due to the excessive heat of the season.

The Colonna family suffered a major disaster, when Pompeo's uncle, Prospero Colonna, was defeated and captured at Battle of Marignano on 14 September 1515. Prospero had been the leading general of the Sforza of Milan, and had been leading a force of Milanese and Papal troops, along with the Swiss, against the Genoese, who were reinforced by the French, led by the young King Francis I and the Chevalier Bayard. Prospero was defeated, captured, and deported to France. Bishop Pompeo Colonna made the journey to France to effect his release. Travelling in the middle of the winter of 1515–1516, he was caught in an avalanche which engulfed an embassy from Sion just a few steps in front of him. Reaching France, he spent six months until the French king made a decision. King Francis, meditating on a plan to reclaim the Angevin kingdom of Naples, and realizing that he would need the friendly cooperation of the Pope and assistance in the Papal States, generously agreed to release Prospero Colonna, on the condition that Prospero agree in writing to serve under Francis' banner. Having reached Italy, however, Prospero began to raise troops to put at the disposal of Charles V at the siege of Verona. Prospero sent his nephew Pompeo on an embassy to the Emperor Maximilian and King Charles, and charged him with winning over King Ferdinand, Max's grandson. In this he was successful. Ferdinand provided Pompeo with money, and he proceeded through Germany to Bruxelles, where he engaged in discussions with Prince Charles, who was then Duke of Burgundy and an Austrian Archduke. He was then recalled to Rome by his uncle.

== Cardinal ==
Pompeo Colonna was created cardinal-priest along with thirty other prelates by Pope Leo X in his fifth Consistory for the creation of Cardinals, on 1 July 1517. On 4 November 1517 he was assigned the titulus of the Basilica XII Apostolorum. He then became famous for his banquets and intellectual activities.

Immediately after his promotion, he was sent to Germany (Germania Superior), where he met the Emperor in Augsburg (Augusta Vindelicorum), and followed his court, inspecting the German cities and learning of their moral state. He spent a good deal of time hunting with him. He returned to Rome and undertook all the activities of a cardinal in the papal court with enthusiasm and competence. On 7 January 1521, Pope Leo named Cardinal Colonna administrator of the diocese of Potenza in the Kingdom of Naples. He held the diocese until he was deprived of all of his benefices as a result of his attack on Pope Clement VII in 1526. Each of these administratorships was a source of income for its holder, income which would normally have gone to the bishop, with the obligation to see to the transaction of the diocese's business in the Roman Curia. The administrator also enjoyed the right to fill whatever benefices were vacant during his term, normally a privilege of the Bishop; this allowed him to reward his faithful followers and servants at no expense to himself.

In the meantime, on 12 January 1519, the Emperor Maximilian died. In the struggle to elect his successor, Pope Leo supported Francis I of France, which set him at odds with the King. Leo hoped to be able to recover the cities of Parma and Piacenza for the Papal States, which had been seized and garrisoned by King Francis. The result was a four years long war in Italy. One of the French commanders was Pompeo Colonna's childhood friend and cousin, Marcantonio Colonna, and another was Giacomo Zabecario, Pompeio's half-brother, which brought great embarrassment. The two cities had scarcely been recovered for the Church when Pope Leo was stricken during a hunting party at Magliano, some six miles from Rome.

== Conclave of 1521–1522 ==
Pope Leo died on Sunday 1 December 1521, aged 46, leaving the Papacy with debts amounting to 1,154,000 ducats, according to Giovanni Mattheo, the secretary of Cardinal Giulio de' Medici. Bishop Guidolotto wrote to the Duke of Urbino that the debt stood at 800,000 ducats. Hieronymus Severino reported to the Emperor that the Apostolic See had been left 850,000 ducats in debt by Leo X, and that other debts amounted to an additional 300,000 ducats; the new pope, he said, would be in great financial difficulties. The Emperor Charles had promised to support the English Cardinal Wolsey, but his orders to his agents in Rome ordered support for Cardinal Giulio de'Medici. Secretly, he informed Cardinal Tommaso de Vio Cajetanus that his real preference, when the time was ripe, was for Cardinal Adrian of Dertosa, his boyhood tutor and his current Regent in Spain. The Florentine Orator, in a moment of complete frankness, wrote on 18 December, that Medici was not electable, but that he had sufficient votes to prevent anyone else from being elected. On the 20th the Venetian ambassador reported that Pompeo Colonna had deserted Medici, and that the Imperial agent, Msgr. von Lutrech, was remarking that Leo X had been an annoyance to the Emperor in the conflict with France over the Duchy of Milan. Juan Manuel, the Ambassador of the Emperor in Rome, reported to his master on 6 January 1522 that Cardinal Colonna was the worst of the opponents of Cardinal de' Medici. The Conclave to elect Pope Leo's successor opened on 27 December 1521. Cardinal Pompeo Colonna was one of thirty-nine cardinals who participated in the deliberations. On Thursday 9 January 1522, Cardinal Adrian Florenszoon Boeyens, who was not even present at the Conclave, was elected. One of the Imperial votes in his favor was that of Cardinal Colonna. Cardinal Adrian chose to keep his own personal name, and was called Adrian VI. Immediately after the election, a Congregation of the Cardinals was held, and it was voted that Cardinal Pompeo Colonna and Cardinal Alessandro Cesarini were to be dispatched to Spain to notify the new Pope of his election and escort him to Rome. The Pope-elect, however, sent word to Rome that the Cardinals should not travel to Spain to meet him.

On 9 February 1522 he was named Governor of Terni. Cardinal Colonna, on 13 March 1522, wrote that he and Cardinal Cristoforo Numai had arranged a truce for six months between Terni and Collescipoli; Cardinal Colonna has pledged his word to Collescipoli that Terni would not attack them

Following the death of Cardinal Matthias Schiner, Cardinal Pompeo Colonna was named Administrator of the diocese of Catania in Sicily on 27 February 1523. He held the Administratorship until 18 January 1524, when Marino Caracciolo was appointed bishop.

On the same day, 27 February 1523, Cardinal Pompeo was named Legatus a latere (papal Ambassador) to the King of Hungary and Poland, Sigismund I the Old. He was still in Rome in mid-March, however, when he protested the Pope's investiture of the Duchy of Urbino, which Pompeo claimed belonged to the Colonna de iure.

Pope Adrian VI, however, did not survive long. He grew increasingly incapacitated, and succumbed to kidney disease on 14 September 1523. He had reigned for one year, eight months, and six days.

== Conclave of 1523 ==
The Conclave opened on 1 October 1523, with thirty-five cardinals in attendance. Four more cardinals joined them over the following weeks. Six cardinals were unable to attend. One analysis of the participants indicated that the French faction numbered 13, the Imperial faction 4, the Medici faction 16, and six Neutral cardinals. The French and Imperialists were in jealous competition with one another. Francis I expressed his approval of Cardinal Fieschi (Genoa), or Cardinal Soderini (Volterra), or Cardinal Trivulzi (Como)—all supporters of French ambitions in northern Italy and Naples. The Emperor Charles expressed his approval of Cardinal Colonna, who was a personal friend, and then of Cardinal de' Medici. There were also several cardinals who had received support at the Conclave of 1521–1522 who might have harbored ambitions of their own under the right circumstances; they were Cardinals Orsini, Pucci and Giacobazzi. It was immediately apparent that the French had the votes to exclude any Imperial candidate, and the Imperial faction likewise. If the Imperial and Medici factions joined, however, they had a good chance of making a pope, but they needed six votes from elsewhere to realize their goal. The major stumbling block to the plan was the hostility between Cardinal Colonna and Cardinal de' Medici. There was also a division among the cardinals between 'the Elders' and the 'Younger Cardinals' (those created by Leo X de' Medici); the Elders were most reluctant to support Cardinal Giulio de' Medici.

The Cardinals were in no hurry to begin the scrutinies, since the French cardinals had not yet arrived. They occupied their time with the Electoral Capitulations (a sort of party platform, to which they all could and would subscribe) until 5 October. These discussions helped to reveal and give concrete form to the agreements and disagreements among the cardinals. The French arrived on the morning of 6 October, and voting began on the morning of the 8th. Two cardinals, Numai and Cybo, were confined to bed. Cardinal Carvajal (called Santa Croce), the Dean of the College of Cardinals, received ten votes on the first scrutiny, and managed ultimately to get as many as twelve. It was immediately apparent that Cardinal Pompeo Colonna could not attract votes. He therefore turned his attention to frustrating Cardinal de' Medici's ambitions and to promoting an Imperial candidate. His choice was Cardinal Domenico Giacobazzi.

At some point during the first two weeks, Cardinal della Valle, a member of the Medici faction, managed to poll sixteen votes, and three cardinals switched to his side at the accessio (opportunity to change votes before the final announcement of the totals). With nineteen votes he was within striking distance of the Papacy. Medici then pledged three of his votes to della Valle, on the condition (Medici later said) that he get eighteen votes at the scrutiny, not counting any additional votes at the accessio. Medici, however, did not deliver the promised votes. This produced a bad feeling all around, and the 'Elders' swore that they would never vote for a member of Medici's faction. Four cardinals who had promised their votes to Medici withdrew their promises.

Medici was polling between sixteen and eighteen votes, but was being opposed by the French faction, who had the thirteen votes that they needed to 'veto' him. The voting quickly fell into a pattern, and for three weeks there was no change in position. Around 25 October, Cardinal Numai received twenty-two votes, only four short of election, but the Imperialists remembered well that he had taken his Degree at the Sorbonne, and that he was a personal friend and former Confessor of the French Queen Mother, Marie of Savoy.

On 31 October, the French ambassador Pio de Carpi arrived at the gates of the Conclave, and showed notable warmth toward his old friend Cardinal de' Medici. The fact was noticed.

By mid-November Cardinal de' Medici became so exasperated at the tactics of Pompeo Colonna that he threatened to put forward the name of Franciotto Orsini, one of Pompeo's hereditary enemies. Rather than see an Orsini made Pope, and aware that he himself could not produce a 'virtual veto' against him, Cardinal Colonna decided that Medici was the lesser of two evils, and that he would have to vote for him. But Medici had forced this course of action on Pompeo Colonna.

On 18 November, Cardinal de' Medici was elected pope, with the support of Pompeo Colonna, Dominico Giacobazzi (of the Imperial faction), and Francesco Armellini de' Medici (of the French faction). He had his twenty-six votes, which quickly became unanimous. The election was not by 'inspiration'. Giulio de' Medici chose to be called Clement VII, and was crowned at S. Peter's on 26 November 1523. Colonna's support was a puzzle for many outsiders, until he was named Vice-Chancellor, the office just vacated by the new Pope, and acquired the Medici palazzo in Rome (the Cancelleria Palace). Colonna's secretary, Vincenzo Pimpinella, became one of Pope Clement's Secretaries.

== Clement VII (Medici) (1523–1534) ==
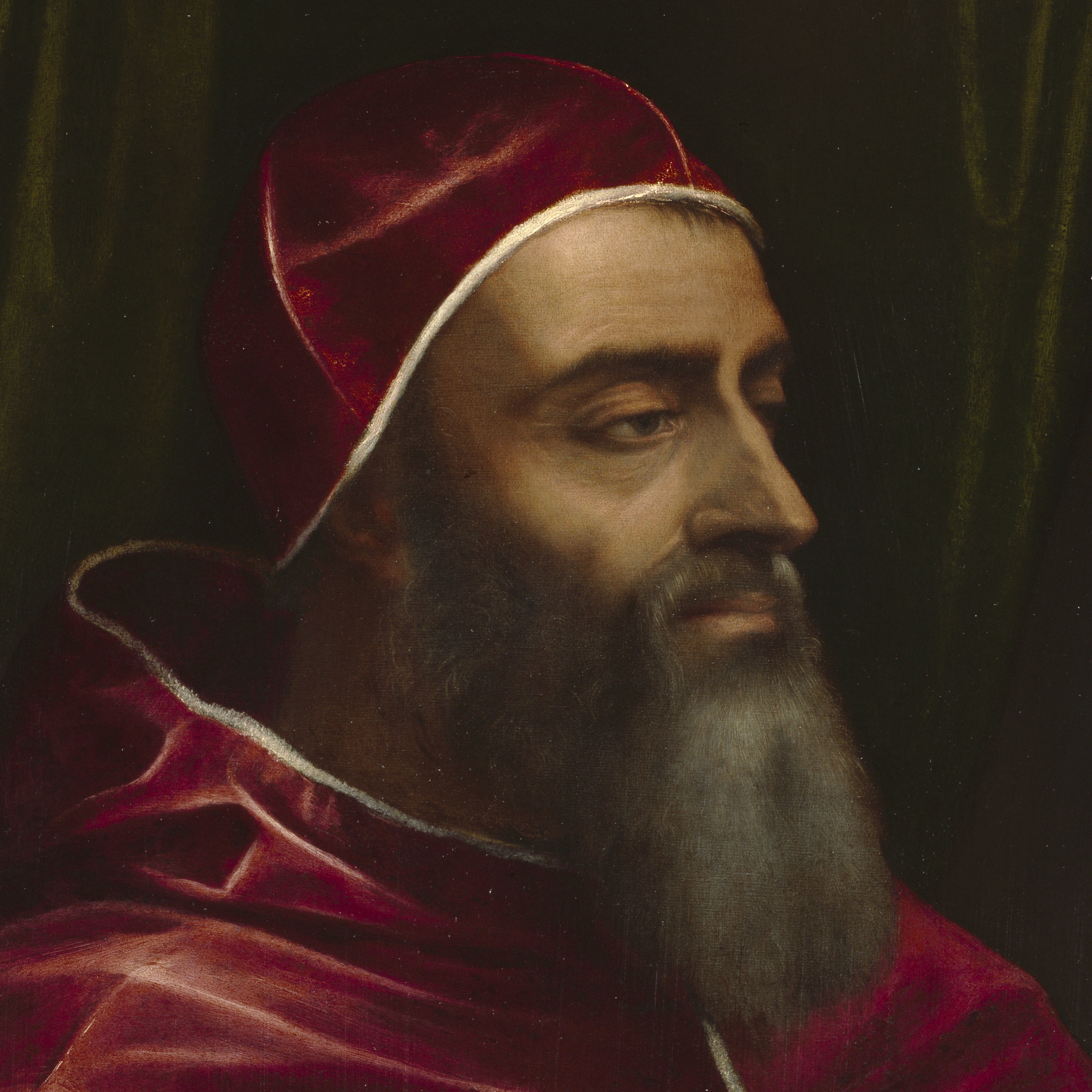
Pope Clement VII Sebastiano del Piombo, ca. 1531

On 11 January 1524 the new Pope, Clement VII (Medici), named Cardinal Colonna to be Vice-Chancellor of the Holy Roman Church, the head of the entire papal Secretariat; the Vice-Chancellorship was the most lucrative of all the offices in the Roman Curia. He was named Cardinal Priest of S. Lorenzo in Lucina on 1 November 1524, and was allowed to keep the Basilica XII Apostolorum in commendam (as protector).

Cardinal Colonna was named Administrator of the diocese of Acerno in the Kingdom of Naples on 18 January 1524; he held the post until 23 June 1525, when a bishop was appointed.

Early in 1524 the Cardinal was also Legate to the Imperial Court, to attempt to bring about a truce between Charles V and Francis I, and Erasmus wrote of him, "He is a clever man (I knew him in Brussels), and let us hope his cleverness will secure a truce at least between the monarchs." He failed, and when Francis invaded Italy in October 1524, he met disaster at the Battle of Pavia on 24 February 1525.

On 23 June 1525, Cardinal Pompeo Colonna was named Administrator of the diocese of Rossano in the Kingdom of Naples, following the death of Bishop Juan Fonseca. On 3 July 1525, Msgr. Vincenzo Pimpinella was named the new bishop. Needless to say, Colonna never visited the place.

On 3 July 1525, after the resignation of Cardinal Giovanni Piccolomini upon his appointment as Cardinal Bishop of Albano, Cardinal Pompeo Colonna was appointed Administrator of the Diocese of Aquila in the Kingdom of Naples. He held the post until his death. During his term as Viceroy of Naples, he was particularly unaccommodating with regard to a request of Cardinal Piccolomini in the naming of a Provost of S. Eusanio Forconese, preferring one of his own retinue from Rieti for the benefice.

== Revolutionary ==
In 1526, Cardinal Pompeo Colonna became directly involved with European politics again. Both the Spanish and the French were furiously negotiating with Pope Clement VII for an alliance. In March the Spanish negotiators in Rome, Herrera and Sessa, invited Cardinal Pompeo to Rome, but he was ill and unable to come. They informed the Pope of this, so that he might know how much the Emperor esteemed Colonna. The Pope replied, loudly and angrily, that Colonna ought to be in Rome doing his business as a good ecclesiastic; since the Pope had never been the occasion for the Cardinal's absence, he would not beg for his return. Colonna was so informed by the Spanish, and he replied that he did not think he could come to Rome in safety, but if the Spanish ambassadors' interests required it, he would come and risk the Pope's wrath.

On 22 May, the League of Cognac was originated by Francis I (who was just released from his captivity following the Battle of Pavia), Pope Clement VII, the Republic of Venice, Florence, and the Sforza of Milan, specifically to destroy the Imperial hold over Italy. The Emperor immediately sent an ambassador to Rome, Ugo Moncada, his Viceroy of Sicily, who arrived on 17 June. His instructions were to either get the Pope to agree to an alliance with the Empire instead of the League of Cognac, or else to set in motion a scheme of Pompeo Colonna to reduce the Pope to obedience by means of a revolution in Rome, which would detach Siena and Florence from his control. This plan was already known to the French Ambassador, Alberto Pio de Carpi, who informed King Francis on 24 June. He had also seen the proposed Spanish articles of capitulation, which he did not deem to be damaging to Francis' position. Despite several offers which Moncada presented the Pope if he would cooperate, the Pope refused all Moncada's offers. Moncada left Rome on 26 June, issuing dire warnings about the consequences of the Pope's obstinacy. He went immediately to the Colonna.

The war that ensued was a disaster for the Pope. His allies the Sforza attempted a coup in Milan, but were besieged in the fortress and finally forced to surrender on 24 July. None of the allies in the League of Cognac was forthcoming with effective help. The Florentine allies of the Pope instead made an attempt against Siena, along with the Orsini, but they were defeated. This gave the Colonna, and all the other Ghibbelines in central Italy, the signal to rise against the papal government. On 20 September, a force of 3,000 foot soldiers and 800 cavalry, led by Cardinal Pompeo Colonna, entered Rome by the Porta S. Giovanni. Despite appeals from Pope Clement, the Senators and People of Rome refused to rally to the papal defense. The Colonna forces marched through Trastevere and forced their way into the Borgo. The Pope fled to the Castel S. Angelo, and the Vatican and S. Peter's Basilica were sacked. Pompeo and Moncada took up residence at the palace of the Basilica of XII Apostolorum, which belonged to Cardinal Pompeo Colonna.

Next day, 21 September 1526, Pope Clement was forced to summon the two to a meeting. Only Moncado agreed to go, against the urging of Colonna, but the Pope was compelled to give as hostages Cardinal Ridolfi and Cardinal Cibò. Moncado extracted from the Pope a four-month-long truce with the Emperor, removal of Papal troops from Lombardy, the withdrawal of the papal fleet from Genoa, and a full pardon for the Colonna and permission for them to withdraw to Naples. The Pope kept none of his promises, claiming that they had been extracted by threats and force, and the Colonna, who wanted to capture the Pope, were angry with Moncada for allowing the opportunity to slip away. Cardinal Pompeo retired to his monastery at Grottaferrata, and then made for Naples.

Then the Pope turned on the Colonna. He raised a small army with the help of the Orsini and their allies, and planned an expedition against Naples. In addition, on 7 November Clement VII issued a monitorium (summons to appear for trial, de vi et proditione) against Cardinal Pompeo, but when Pompeo from Naples made an appeal to a future General Council, the Pope placed him under the ban. On 21 November 1526, Cardinal Colonna was deprived of the Vice-Chancellorship after a trial conducted by the Archbishop of Ravenna (1524–1529) Benedetto Accolti, the Pope's secretary; twenty cardinals voted for his removal from office. He was restored on 27 March 1527. The treaty with Moncada had been violated by the Pope in the expectation of French aid, which was not forthcoming. The Emperor in the meantime sent an army of 7,000 Spanish and German troops from Carthagena to Naples on 24 October 1526. At the same time, the famous Tyrolean condottiere Georg von Frundsberg, having collected a large band of Landsknechts, descended into the Po Valley, headed for Milan. His army was placed under the command of Duke Charles de Bourbon, who was engaged in the siege of Milan.

== Sack of Rome (1527) ==
In mid-November 1526 Frundberg and 12,000 men crossed the Alps. They joined Duke Charles at Piacenza on 7 February 1527, and, with a total force of some 30.000 troops, waited at Piacenza for twenty days for money and supplies. France and Venice were urging the Pope to action, while Florence, watching the approach of the German soldiers, was desperate for the Pope to make a peace. They offered him 150,000 ducats to buy peace from the Viceroy of Naples. The Emperor Charles, desiring peace himself, sent his agent, Cesare Ferramosca, to Gaeta in November, to get in touch with Clement VII, offering him a peace which would include France and Venice. The terms involved the loss by the Papacy of Ostia, Civitavecchia, Pisa, Parma, Piacenza and Livorno; the payment of 200,000 ducats for the Landsknechten, and the restoration of the Colonna. Ferramosca arrived in Rome on 25 January.

A surprise skirmish took place on 31 January at Frosinone, in which the Imperial forces, in which Cardinal Pompeo Colonna was playing a military role, were bested. This gave the Pope and the Cardinals in Rome the false hope that caused them to reject the terms presented by the Emperor's agent. But in March, with papal money run out, the soldiers in the papal army began to disband. The French had promised aid, but it was not forthcoming until 11 March, and then the French Ambassador, Guillaume du Bellay, brought with him as well a list of terms, one of which was an expedition of the Pope against Naples. On 15 March the Pope decided to sign a treaty with the Viceroy of Naples, Carlo di Lannoy, and he did pardon the Colonna.

=== March on Rome ===
Meanwhile, the army of Germans and Spaniards had reached the territory of Bologna, from whom they demanded supplies, since they had been living by plunder for some weeks. The Bolognese refused, and the Spaniards in the army rose in revolt on 13 March; they were immediately joined by the Germans. The Constable Bourbon barely escaped with his life. Duke Alfonso of Ferrara, who was supporting the Emperor, refused his assistance to the army. Frundberg faced the leaders of the revolt, but suffered a stroke, which ended the campaign for him. But the Constable Bourbon, who was in command of the Imperial army was no longer in control of it, as he admitted in letters both to Lannoy and the Pope on 29 March. The Pope replied by sending a Nuncio, the Archbishop of Riga (1523–1531) Giovanni Blankenfeld, but Blankenfeld was unwilling to go beyond the security of Florence to meet the Germans and Spaniards. The army continued its march south in the direction of Florence and Rome. The Viceroy proceeded north to meet the Constable on 18 April, bringing with him some 80,000 ducats, which were being supplied by the Florentines. This was intended to buy time for the Florentines to gather their allies and prepare their defense. The Constable claimed that he needed three times that amount to satisfy the troops, who refused to halt their march, and actually nearly killed Lannoy. He managed to escape and reached Siena on 25 April, where he was trapped during the critical days leading up to the Sack. On the same day the Imperial army crossed the Arno and reached Arezzo. On 26 April there was an attempted revolution in Florence by the opponents of the Medici, whose agent, Cardinal Silvio Passerini, had drained the population of so much of their resources; it failed, due to the arrival of some Medici allies.

At the end of April, Cardinal Pompeo Colonna and Ugo de Moncada wrote to Lannoy that they had prepared an insurrection in Rome for 10 May. Pope Clement, his funds exhausted, tried to renew his treaty with the leaders of the Imperial party. The agreement to the treaty was concluded on 1 May in the Basilica of the Twelve Apostles, next to the Colonna palace, and not only did Cardinal Pompeo swear to the treaty, but he also gave a dinner for the Pope and the Imperial negotiators—all of this despite his ongoing plans for an insurrection. The Emperor, however, did not agree to the terms of the treaty with the Pope and his allies, the French and the Venetians. Neither were the French or the Venetians willing to agree. On 2 May the Imperial army reached Viterbo. On 4 May, at Ronciglione they routed a papal force under the command of Ranuccio Farnese. On the same day they were promised military support by the Colonna.

The Pope was having trouble raising soldiers from any quarter. On 3 May he created five new cardinals, just to raise money. At the same time, sensible people were leaving Rome. These included Cardinal Egidio di Viterbo, the Bishops of Volterra, Bologna, and Pesaro; the familia of Cardinal Campeggio, Filippo Strozzi and his wife. The Spanish-German army, numbering some 40,000 soldiers, reached Rome on Sunday 5 May, and that afternoon the Constable de Bourbon made the Convent of S. Onofrio his headquarters. The Cardinal Colonna arrived in Rome on Friday 10 May.

=== The Sack (7–14 May) ===
The attack on Rome began around 4:00 am on 7 May with a two-pronged assault on the southern gate to the Leonine City (Vatican), at the Porta Santo Spirito and at a weak point in the wall near the Campo Santo. In the first assault, the Constable de Bourbon was killed by the shot of an arquebus. The famous goldsmith Benvenuto Cellini, who was with the papal party and fled with Clement VII to the Castel S. Angelo, claimed credit as the marksman, though the morning was foggy and the arquebus' accuracy is not great. Without its leader, the successful Imperial force quickly degenerated into a mob of murderers and looters. In the afternoon the Trastevere was captured, and the Imperial troops forced their way across the Ponte Sisto into the city. One report has it that Cardinal Colonna's palazzo was sacked. The palazzo had been the refuge of Isabella Gonzaga, the mother of the brand new Cardinal Ercole, and some 3,000 people were being sheltered there. On 13 May she managed to escape the palazzo and Rome.

Cardinal Colonna played a visible role in the Sack of Rome, with a group of mercenaries and peasants from the Colonna fiefs in Lazio and elsewhere, ultimately amounting to more than 8,000 men. They came up from Lanuvium, by way of the Porta S. Paolo. The Cardinal was accompanied by his half-brother Giacomo. Camillo Colonna, the son of Cardinal Pompeo's eldest brother, led the street fighting as far as the Orsini stronghold at Monte Giordano. Cardinal Pompeo took up residence in the Cancelleria Palace, which had been his when he was Vice-Chancellor. It was reported that the Cardinal sheltered his fellow cardinals Della Valle, Cesarini and Siena, who had bribed the Imperialists to leave their palaces untouched, but who fell victims anyway to the Landsknechten. He also sheltered more than 500 nuns, crowded (it is most incredibly said) in a single room. It was alleged that one of the nephews of Cardinal Colonna participated in the sack of a convent and rape of the nuns. On 10 May Cardinal Pompeo was put in command of the part of Rome immediately in front of the Castel S. Angelo, the rione of the city called "Ponte", and the Ponte Molle.

With the Viceroy of Naples, Lannoy, trapped in Siena (and the Prince of Orange unwilling to have him in Rome), the Cardinal assumed control of the city of Rome, as much as anyone could, while his personal enemy, pope Clement VII, was a prisoner in Castel Sant'Angelo. The victorious Imperial party made La Motte the Governor of the City of Rome and Philibert of Orange the head of the army. A council was appointed, including Bemelberg (Frundberg's successor), the Abbot of Nagera (Fernando Marin, Commissary General of the Imperial Armies in Italy), Giovanni Battista Lodron, Juan de Urbina, Cardinal Pompeo Colonna, Vespasiano Colonna (Prospero's son), Girolamo Morone (the Sforza agent), Mercurino Gattinara (the Emperor's Grand Chancellor), and others. On 11 May 1527 it was reported to the Marchese of Mantua that Cardinal Colonna was going to be restored to all of his dignities and benefices, as soon as the Pope could arrange a Consistory. This was an explicit part of the treaty which was being worked out between the Emperor and the Pope Early in June it was reported that Cardinal Colonna was ill with 'the flux' (dysentery? typhoid fever?) or the peste, and even that he was dead. More accurately, the Secretary Perez wrote to the Emperor on 30 May that Colonna had been ill for four or five days with a fever, but that he was recovering. On 5 June it was reported by Cardinal Francesco Pisani that Cardinal Colonna had come to the Castel S. Angelo to kiss the hand of the Pope, despite the fact that the Pope was unwilling.

The Sack itself lasted a total of eight days.

=== Fallout ===
On 23 June 1527 it was reported to the Emperor by the Abbot of Najera that the Pope had been asked by the Spanish to name Cardinal Pompeo Colonna his Vicar for Rome in spiritual matters, but the Pope replied that he would neither authorize nor consent to such an arrangement. In fact the Pope was refusing to transact any ecclesiastical business at all so long as he was in the Castel S. Angelo. The plan, nonetheless, was still being promoted by Alarcon, Nagera and Urbina in mid-July, as the solution as to who should take charge when the Pope departed Rome for Rocco di Papa or Salmonetta. By 26 June Cardinal Pompeo and all who were staying with him had left Rome out of fear of the plague. The Imperial army officially left Rome on 12 July, leaving behind much of their plunder and taking with them the plague.

At the beginning of March 1528, Cardinal Pompeo was in Naples, allegedly to visit his cousin Ascanio, the Grand Constable of the Kingdom of Naples. In April, however, the Cardinal had a falling out with the Prince of Orange and left Naples, making for Gaeta.

He was later legate in Ancona.

On 20 April 1529, Cardinal Pompeo was named Administrator of the diocese of Aversa in the Kingdom of Naples by Clement VII; he resigned upon the appointment of his nephew Fabio Colonna to the See on 24 September 1529. Cardinal Colonna was named Administrator of the diocese of Sarno in the Kingdom of Naples on 24 August 1530, and he continued in that office until his death on 28 June 1532. On 14 December 1530 the Cardinal was named archbishop of Monreale by Pope Clement VII, and was granted the pallium on 6 February 1531 He held the office until his death in 1532.

== Career in Naples ==
In 1530 he was created Lieutenant General of the Kingdom of Naples by the Emperor Charles V, and when Philibert of Chalon, Prince of Orange, died on 3 August 1530, Cardinal Colonna was named Viceroy of Naples in his place. Cardinal Pompeo was also a poet. His most famous work is De laudibus mulierum, written for his relative Vittoria Colonna, who was also a poet. The poem was never published.

Pope Clement was urged by several people from the Netherlands and Spain, who were eager to have Cardinal Pompeo's position in Naples, that he allow the Cardinal to return to Rome and live in retirement on his Tusculan estates. The Pope replied that he would be willing to forget the past and receive Pompeo among foremost members of his Court, but Pompeo must agree to live in the City rather than the country and take part in Consistory. But Cardinal Pompeo, having no doubt that he would be in danger, would not allow himself to be tempted by any offers to get him to return to Rome.

== Death ==
In early 1532, the Cardinal was obliged to raise troops and money for the army which Charles V was leading into Hungary, intending to defend Vienna and rescue his brother, King (later Emperor) Ferdinand I from the giant army of Suleiman the Magnificent. He summoned a public meeting at S. Lorenzo in Naples, explained the Emperor's requirements to the barons of the Kingdom of Naples, and managed to extract some 600,000 ducats from them, the payment of which was to be spread over four years. The Prince of Salerno was designated to take the money to the Emperor. Two of the Cardinal's nephews Camillo and Marzio joined the expedition. A few days later, Pompeo began to feel ill, but his malady was at first dismissed. His doctors complained that he always drank his wine iced with snow from the mountains of Samnium, and that he was addicted to figs. Apparently they had no diagnosis, but, whatever was making him ill was centered in his stomach, and it quickly undermined his constitution. Cardinal Pompeo Colonna died in Naples on 28 June 1532. He was buried in the Church of S. Anna of Monte Oliveto.

== Bibliography ==
=== Contemporary authors ===
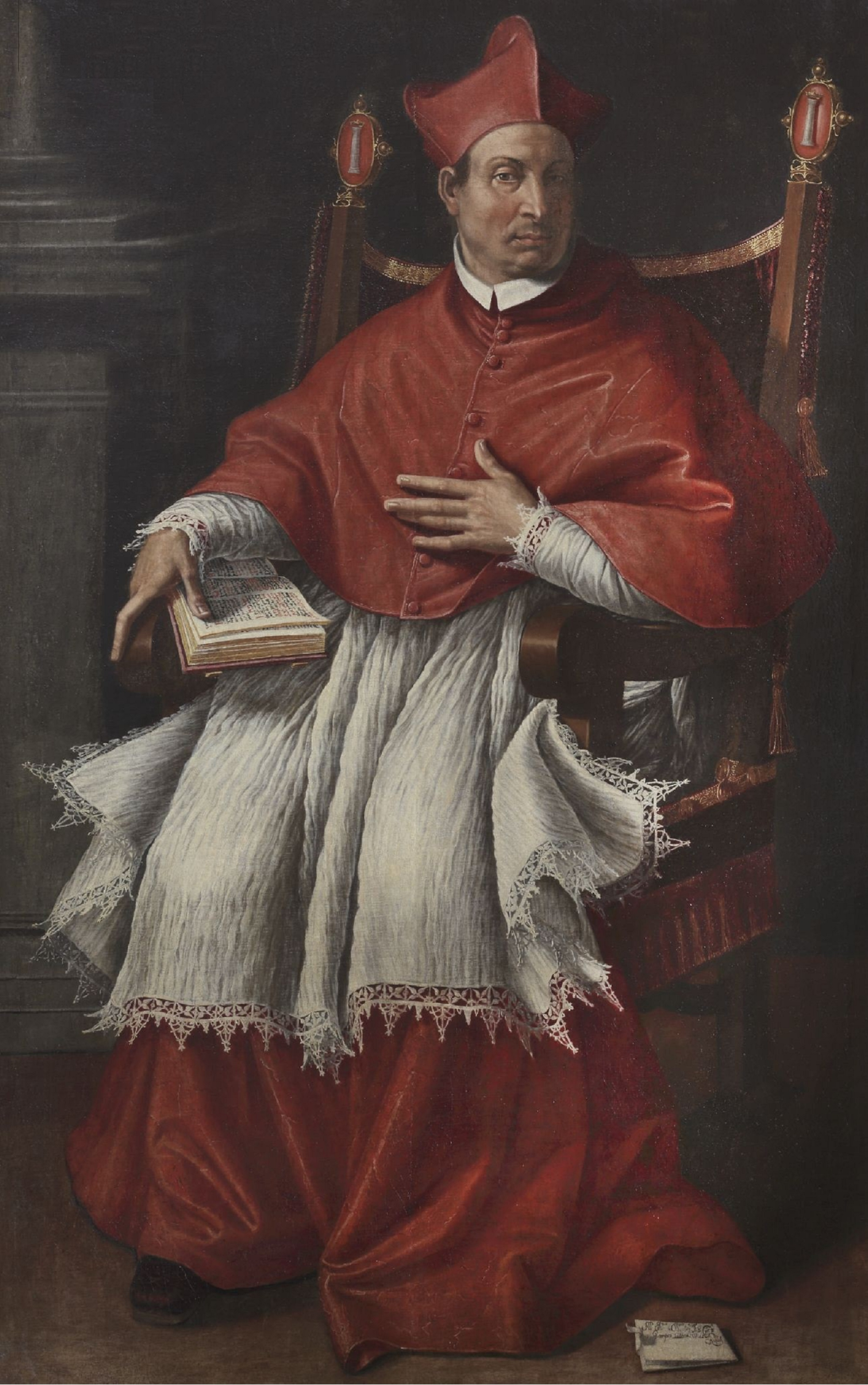
Pompeo Colonna portrayed by Jacopino del Conte

- Giovio, Paolo (1549). De vita Leonis X pont. max. libri IV ... Accesserunt Hadriani VI. pont. max. et Pompeii Columnae cardinalis vitae. Florence: Laur. Torrentinus. [in Latin]
- Giovio, Paolo; Lodovico Domenichi (1551). Le vite di Leon decimo et d'Adriano 6. sommi pontefici, et del cardinal Pompeo Colonna, scritte per mons. Paolo Giouio vescouo di Nocera, & tradotte da m. Lodouico Domenichi. Fiorenza: appresso Lorenzo Torrentino. [Italian translation]
- Guicciardini, Francesco (1753). The History of Italy: Written in Italian. Vol. IV. Translated by Austin Parke Goddard. London: J. Towers.
- Guicciardini, Francesco (1756). The History of Italy: From the Year 1490 to 1532. Vol. IX (Books 17 & 18). Translated by Austin Parke Goddard. London: J. Towers.
- Augustino Theiner, ed. (1877). Caesaris S. R. E. Cardinalis Baronii Annales ecclesiastici: A. D. 1-1571. Vol. Tomus 31. Barri-Ducis: ex typis Celestinorum - Bertrand.
- Augustino Theiner, ed. (1878). Caesaris S. R. E. Cardinalis Baronii Annales ecclesiastici: A. D. 1-1571. Vol. Tomus 32. Barri-Ducis: Typis Celestinorum - Bertrand.
- Sanudo, Marino (1897). Federico Stefani; Guglielmo Berchet (eds.). I diarii di Marino Sanuto (in Italian). Vol. XLVI. Venezia: Stamperia F. Visentini.
- Erasmus, Desiderius (1992). R. A. B. Mynors; Alexander Dalzell (eds.). The Correspondence of Erasmus: Letters 1356 to 1534, 1523 to 1524. Vol. VIII. University of Toronto Press. p. 207. ISBN 978-0-8020-5976-5. [English translations, with notes]
- Erasmus, Desiderius (2003). Dalzell, Alexander (ed.). The Correspondence of Erasmus Letters 1658 to 1801: January 1526–March 1527. Vol. XII. Toronto: University of Toronto Press. ISBN 978-0-8020-4831-8. [English translations, with notes]
- G. A. Bergenroth, ed. (1866). Calendar of Letters, Despatches, and State Papers, Relating to the Negotiations Between England and Spain, Preserved in the Archives at Simancas, Vienna, Brussels, and Elsewhere (in English, Latin, and French). Vol. Henry VIII. Volume II. London: Longman, Green, Longman & Roberts.
- Pascual de Gayangos, ed. (1877). Calendar of Letters, Despatches, and State Papers Relating to the Negotiations Between England and Spain Preserved in the Archives at Simancas and Elsewhere: Henry VIII. 1509–[1546] 12 v. Vol. III, Part 2 (Henry VIII) 1527–1529. London: Longman, Green, Longman, & Roberts. p. 164.

=== Modern authors ===
- Giannone, Pietro (1821). "Chapter VI". Istoria civile del regno di Napoli. Vol. VII. Milano: Nicolò Bettoni. pp. 20–56.
- Creighton, Mandell (1887). "Chapter IX: The Sack of Rome". A History of the Papacy During the Period of the Reformation. Vol. VI of six volume edition. London: Longmans Green & Co. ISBN 978-1-108-04109-6.
- Consorti, Aida (1902). Il Cardinale Pompeo Colonna: su documenti editi e inediti; (con ritratto). Roma: Consorti.
- Gregorovius, Ferdinand (1902). History of the City of Rome in the Middle Ages. Vol. VIII, part 1. London: G. Bell & sons.
- Gregorovius, Ferdinand (1902). History of the City of Rome in the Middle Ages. Vol. VIII, part 2. Translated by Annie Hamilton. London: G. Bell & sons.
- Pastor, Ludwig (1925, 1926) Storia dei papi dalla fine del medio evo. Volume III and Volume IV. Roma, Desclée.
- Chamberlin, Eric Russell (1979). The Sack of Rome. London: Batsford. ISBN 978-0-7134-1645-9.
- Chastel, André (1983). The Sack of Rome, 1527. Princeton NJ: Princeton U.P. ISBN 978-0-691-09947-7.
- Zimmerman, T. C. Price (1995). "VI". Paolo Giovio: The Historian and the Crisis of Sixteenth-Century Italy. Princeton: Princeton University Press. ISBN 978-1-4008-2183-9.
- Hook, J (2004). The Sack of Rome: 1527. London: Palgrave Macmillan UK. ISBN 978-1-4039-1769-0.
- Chambers, David (29 September 2006). "Chapter 6". Popes, Cardinals and War: The Military Church in Renaissance and Early Modern Europe. London: I.B.Tauris. ISBN 978-0-85771-581-4.
