= Gaete =

- Hamlet
- Location in the province of North Brabant in the Netherlands Gaete (Netherlands)
- Coordinates: 51.69835°N 4.71587°E
- Country: Netherlands
- Province: North Brabant
- Municipality: Drimmelen
- Time zone: UTC+1 (CET)
  - Summer (DST): UTC+2 (CEST)
- Postal code: 4926
- Dialing code: 0168

Gaete is a hamlet in the Dutch province of North Brabant. It is located in the municipality of Drimmelen, about 1 km southeast of the town of Lage Zwaluwe.

Gaete is not a statistical entity, and the postal authorities have placed it under Lage Zwaluwe. Gaeta has no place name signs. It was home to 214 people in 1840. Nowadays, it consists of about 70 houses.

It was first mentioned in 1846 as de Gaete, and means "mouth of a creek".
