= Acerno =

Acerno Acierno
- Comune
- Comune di Acerno
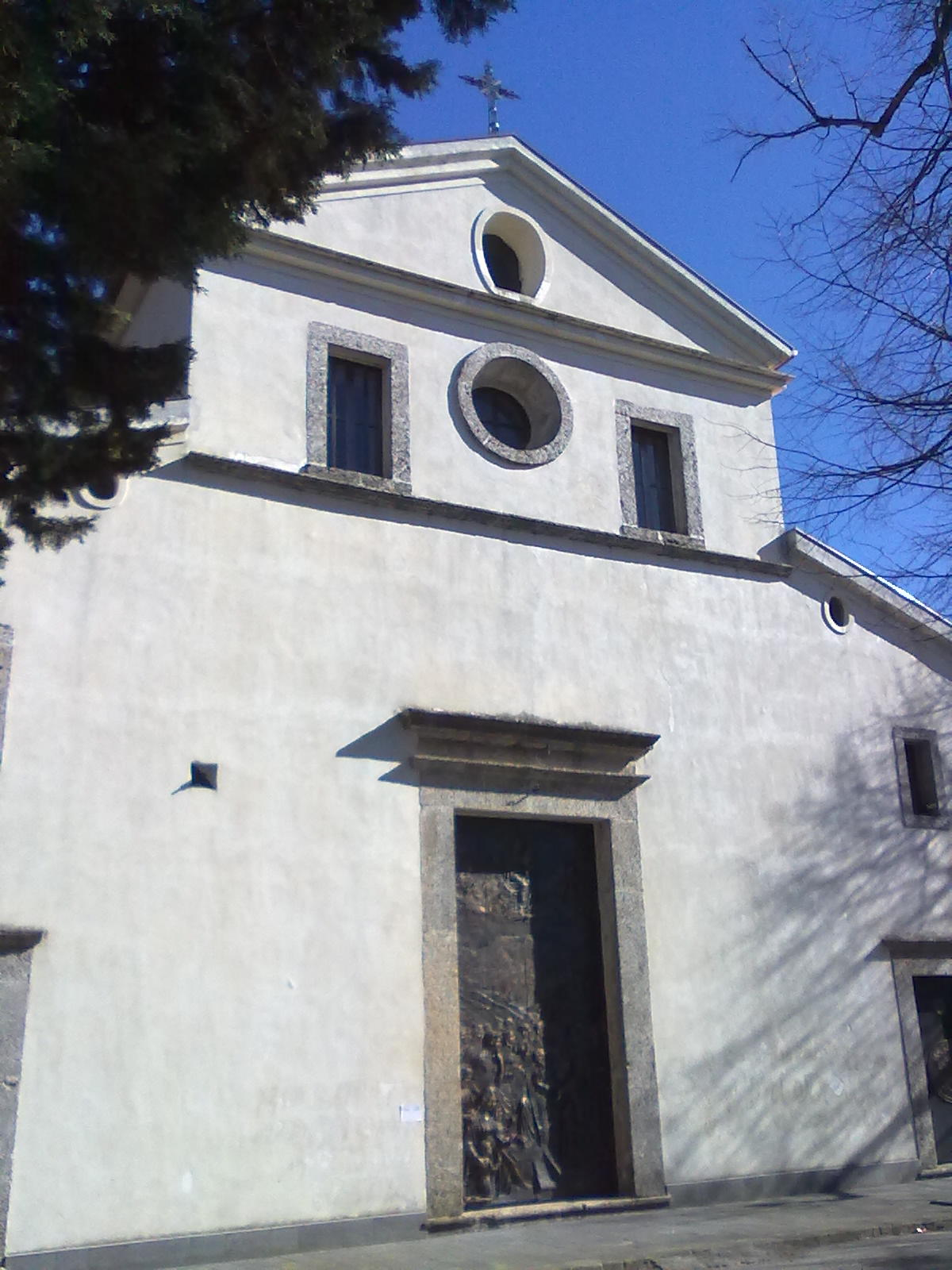
- Co-Cathedral of San Donato.

- Location within Italy Location within Campania
- Coordinates: 40°44′N 15°03′E
- Country: Italy
- Region: Campania
- Province: Salerno

Government
  - Mayor: Massimiliano Cuozzo

Area
  - Total: 72.5 km^{2} (28.0 sq mi)
- Elevation: 727 m (2,385 ft)

Population (31 December 2017)
  - Total: 2,715
  - Density: 37.4/km^{2} (97.0/sq mi)
- Demonym: Acernesi
- Time zone: UTC+1 (CET)
  - Summer (DST): UTC+2 (CEST)
- Postal code: 84042
- Dialing code: 089
- ISTAT code: 065001
- Patron saint: St. Donatus of Arezzo
- Saint day: 7 August
- Website: Official website

Acerno (Neapolitan: Acierno) is a town and comune in the province of Salerno in the region of Campania in south-western Italy.

== Geography ==
Acerno is a large village located 40 km north-east of the provincial capital of Salerno at 727 metres above sea level in the valley of the Tusciano, a river which rises on the slopes of Monte Polveracchio. It lies within the Parco regionale Monti Picentini, a regional park of the Monti Picentini group in the Southern Apennines. The neighbouring municipalities are Giffoni Valle Piana, Montecorvino Rovella, Calabritto, Senerchia, Montella, Bagnoli Irpino and Olevano sul Tusciano.

The communal territory has an elevation varying between 400 and 1790 metres above sea level. Outside of the town itself it is entirely uninhabited by humans: there are no satellite hamlets or even scattered dwellings under permanent habitation. It is rich in flora, however, with forests of maple, oak, chestnut, hazel, beech and alder, while the fauna includes golden eagles, dormice, wild cats, otters and wolves.

The town therefore acts as a base for excursions to the mountains Monte Cervialto, Monte Polveracchio and Monte Acella the peaks reachable after hours of walking and climbing. Although Acerno does attract tourists, the economy is largely based on agriculture: especially sheep, cattle and pig farming, and cereal cultivation.

== History ==
Acerno was founded by refugees from Picentia (today Pontecagnano), which had been destroyed by the Romans after the Second Punic War. The earliest known documentary reference however, preserved in the archives of the abbey of Cava de’ Tirreni, dates from 1027 and refers to fruit growing in a place called Acerno. The origins of the name are uncertain, but a plausible derivation is from acer, the Latin for the maple tree: this was the view of Girolamo Olivieri, bishop of Cerno from 1525 to 1539, who reported to the Holy See that 'the town is called Acerno from the multitude of maples.'

=== Feudalism ===
The comune was the centre of a feud for a long time amongst noble families and throughout the Middle Ages passed hands many times during the Kingdom of Naples.

Around 1150, Guido da Acerno inherited the comune from his father Tommaso. On 17 August 1254, Pope Innocent IV granted Philip d'Acerno possession of Acerno, Castronuovo and various feudal estates. In 1272 Charles I of Anjou granted Acerno to his eldest son Charles, Prince of Salerno. In 1298 it fell under the ownership of Roger of Lauria and was later owned by William Vaccaro (1337), Roberto Grillo (1346), Francesco Guindazzo (1381) and Antonio de Muro (1445). In 1453 a university for Acerno and Calabritto was built.

In 1469, Troiano Santomango became lord of Acerno, Calabritto and Muro, and on 11 September 1500 reached a financial agreement with other feudal lords over taxes. The territory was inherited by his son, Camillo Colonna Marcello, who after his father's death in 1534 owned the land until his death on 10 December 1558. He was succeeded by his son Pompeo, who in 1577 sold the land for 30,500 ducats to Diomedes, Marquis of Castiglione.

Diomedes died on 2 October 1596 and was succeeded by his son Ascanio, who died on 12 August 1605 and was succeeded by his son, Fulvio. In 1619 he loaned the lands under Royal Assent and after a series of owners, including Pompeo Colonna, in 1665 the estate fell into the hands of Antonio Tocco. Tocco died on 5 March 1678 and was succeeded by his nephew Charles, who sold Acerno to Nicola Gascon, Knight of the Order of Alcantara. The Gascon family ran Acerno throughout much of the 18th century until 1777 when it was ceded to the Royal Court when Marquis Giuseppe Gascon, the last owner died without legitimate heirs. Girola Mascaro, President of the Royal House of Salermo was granted power of the territory in 1781 but with the end of feudalism in 1806, he was the last feudal lord of Acerno.

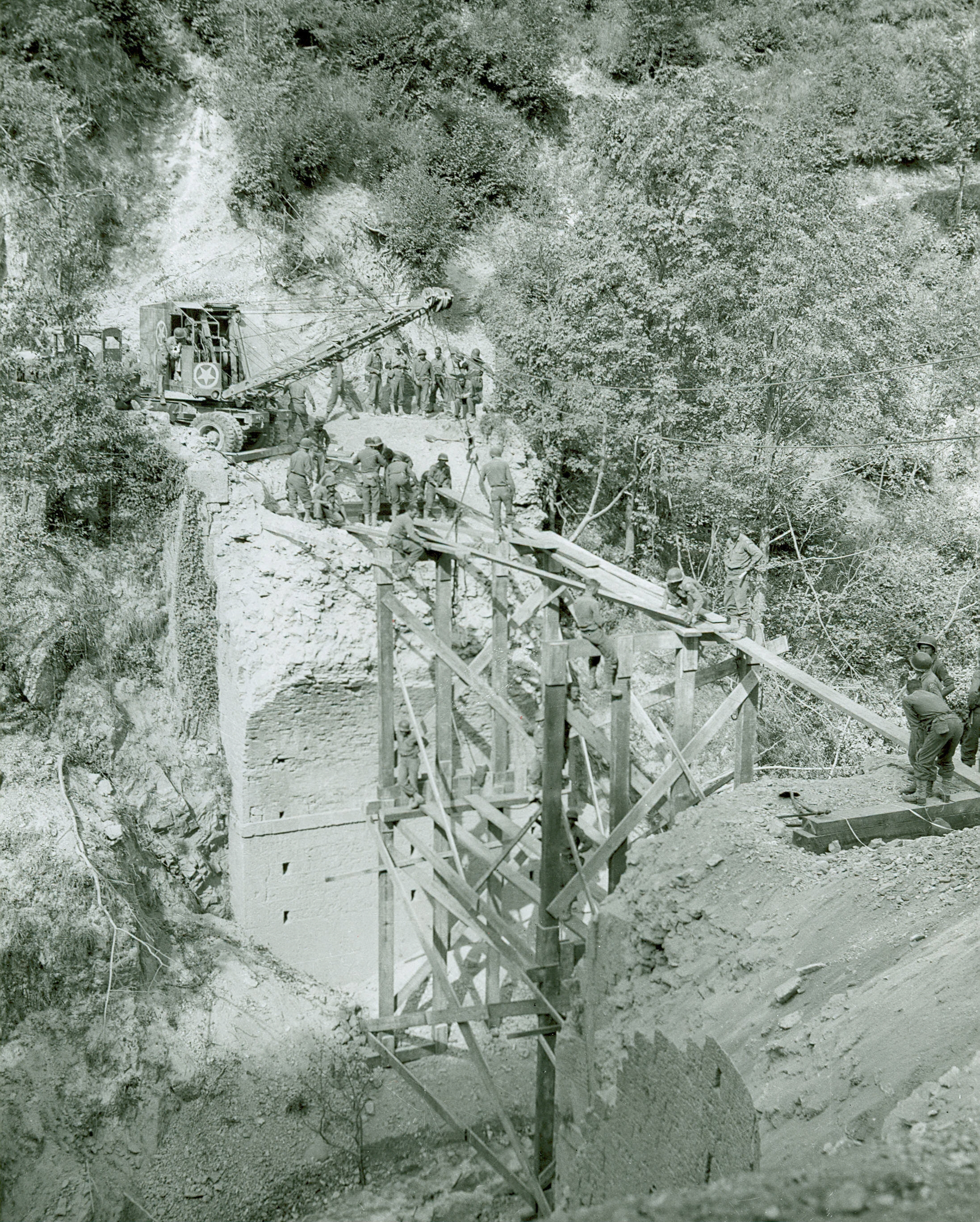
The 10th Engineer Battalion, 3rd Infantry Division on 12 September 1943 in Acerno repairing a bridge destroyed by the Germans.

The Bishopric of Acerno dates back to the 11 or 12th century. The first bishop was named Pisano who was appointed in 1136, followed by Peter, who took part in the Lateran Council in 1179. Acerno lost its own bishopric in 1818 and today has been merged into the Roman Catholic Archdiocese of Salerno-Campagna-Acerno in its present form since 30 September 1986.

=== World War II ===
During World War II, the Anglo-American air forces bombed Acerno, the first time in September, 1943, destroying part of the bishop's palace, the church of S. Maria degli Angeli as well as numerous blocks. On 16 September 1943 five German soldiers invaded the garden of Canon Carmine Sansone, and while they were busy gathering the fruit from the trees, were killed with precision fire from a rifle by the priest. The Germans then shelled the house of the canon, the priest escaped but his niece died in the event.

=== Contemporary age ===
The town was severely damaged in the 1980 Irpinia earthquake.

== Main sights ==
The Cathedral of San Donato, built in 1444, has been destroyed and rebuilt several times. The interior has four paintings depicting the four Evangelists, the work of an artist called Pallas in 1797.

The church of Our Lady of Grace, has an altar in polychrome marble, with the portrait of Our Lady of Grace crowned in the centre. There is also the remains of the castle that belonged to Roger of Lauria.

== People ==
- Pietro Vezzi, philosopher and physician of the Schola Medica Salernitana.
- Thomas II, Bishop of Nocera in Apulia in 1328.
- Sichelman, a tenth-century figure mentioned in the Chronicon Salernitanum. He invented a stone-throwing siege engine for Gisulf I of Salerno.
- Giovanni Freda, president of the High Court.
- Vitale Luppo, conductor.
- Giacinto Maselli, distinguished scholar and poet.
- Andrea Angelo Zottoli, sinologist and Jesuit missionary, was born in Acerno in 1826 and died in Shanghai in 1902. His major work is the Cursus litteraturae sinicae (5 vols., 1879–82), including translation into Latin of the greatest works in prose and poetry in Chinese literature.

== Culture ==
February is the month of the Picentine Carnival. 7 August is the feast day of the patron saint: Donatus, Bishop of Arezzo, who was martyred (according to the Martyrologium Hieronymianum) in 362 by Quadratian, a prefect of the Roman Emperor Julian the Apostate. Celebrations include a procession of the saint, music in the square, stalls selling local produce and closing fireworks. The second Sunday of November is the Sagra of the chestnut: a foodstuff central to the traditional economy of the place.

== See also ==
- Roman Catholic Archdiocese of Salerno-Campagna-Acerno
- Roman Catholic Diocese of Acerno
