= Macchia, Montecorvino Rovella =

Macchia
- Frazione
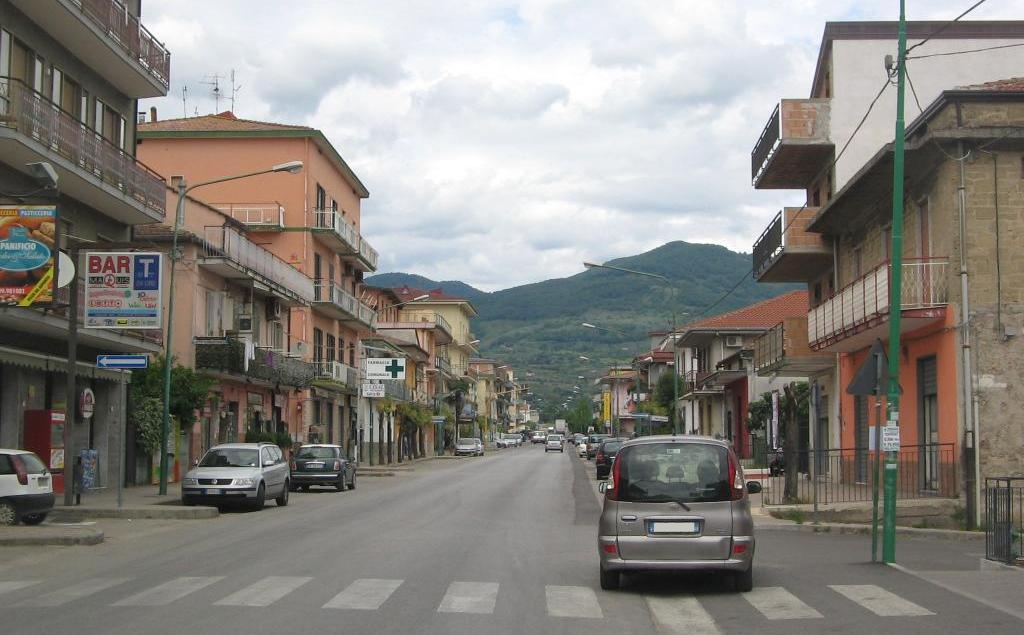
- The central street Via Fratelli Rosselli

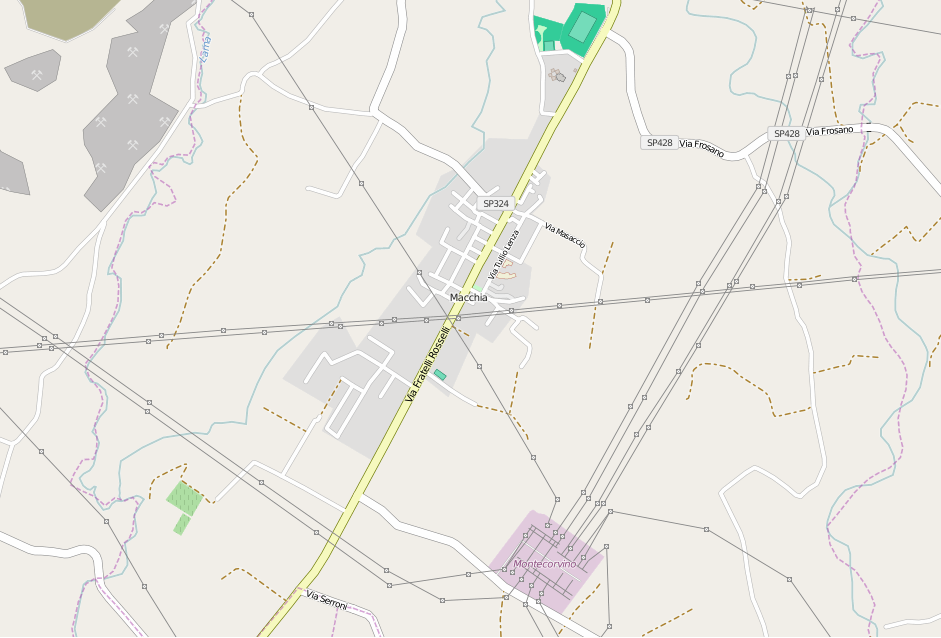
- OSM map of Macchia and the surrounding area

- Location of Macchia in Italy
- Coordinates: 40°39′17.3″N 14°58′50.1″E
- Country: Italy
- Region: Campania
- Province: Salerno (SA)
- Comune: Montecorvino Rovella
- Elevation: 138 m (453 ft)

Population (2011)
  - Total: 1,933
- Demonym: Macchiaroli
- Time zone: UTC+1 (CET)
  - Summer (DST): UTC+2 (CEST)
- Postal code: 84090
- Dialing code: (+39) 089

Macchia is an Italian village and hamlet (frazione) of the municipality of Montecorvino Rovella in the Province of Salerno, Campania. With a population of 1,933 (2011), is the largest frazione of Montecorvino.

== History ==
Its name, literally meaning "stain" in Italian, derives from the maquis shrubland (Italian: Macchia Mediterranea), typical of the area. The village, mainly rural, developed in the last decades of the 20th century, with a small population increase.

== Geography ==
Macchia is a hill village, located on a plain below the Picentini mountain range and included into the Monti Picentini Regional Park. It lies between Montecorvino Rovella (6 km north) and Bellizzi (5 km south), and is crossed in the middle by the state highway SS164, the local main street named Via Fratelli Rosselli.

The northern area, also named "Lenzi" or "Macchia-Lenzi", represent the old settlement, and the southern one is mainly composed of trade buildings. Village's territory includes the surrounding rural localities of Aiello, Incassata, Pianella, San Lorenzo and San Luca.

Macchia is 3 km north of San Martino, 4 km southwest of San Vito, 6 km from Olevano sul Tusciano, 6.6 from Montecorvino Pugliano, 7.5 from Battipaglia, 11 from Pontecagnano and 22 from Salerno.

== Transport ==
Nearest railway station (5 km south), located in Bellizzi, is "Montecorvino-Bellizzi", on the Naples-Salerno-Reggio Calabria line. Nearest motorway exits are "Battipaglia" (7 km southeast) and "Montecorvino Pugliano" (9 km southwest), both on the A2. Macchia is also 8 km north of Salerno-Pontecagnano Airport.

== See also ==
- Tusciano
