= Faiano =

- Frazione
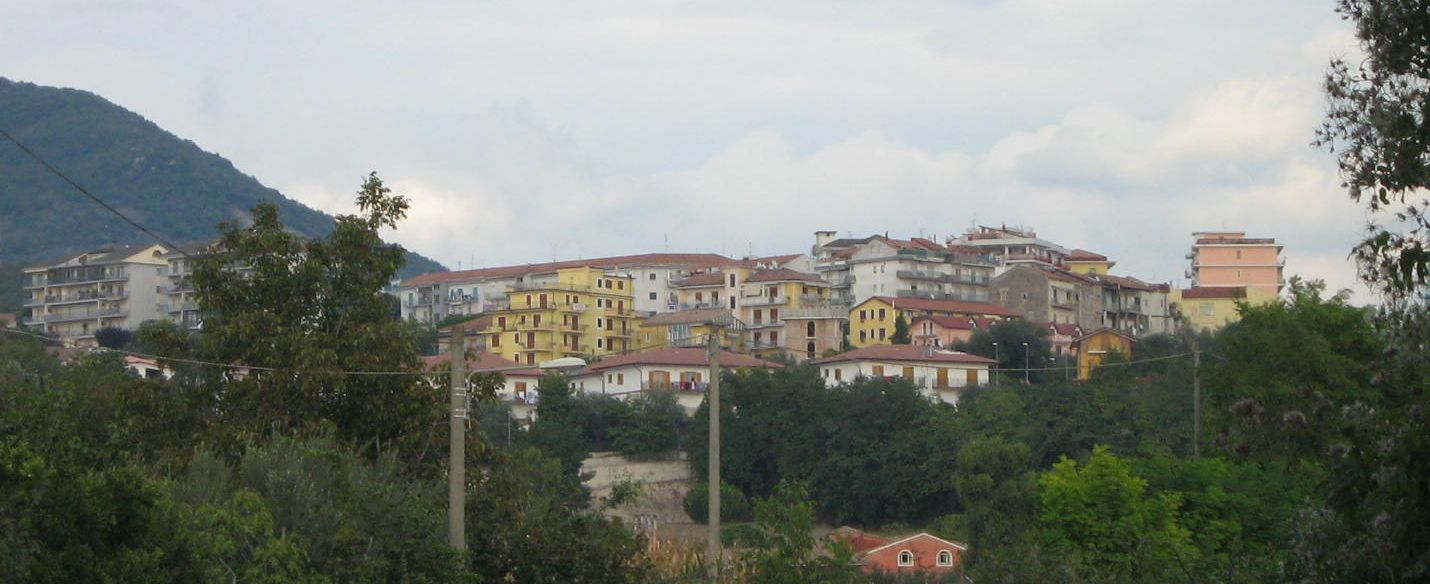
- View from the nearby village of Baroncino

- Location of Faiano in Italy
- Coordinates: 40°39′45.20″N 14°54′03.91″E
- Country: Italy
- Region: Campania
- Province: Salerno (SA)
- Comune: Pontecagnano Faiano
- Elevation: 130 m (430 ft)

Population (2009)
  - Total: 3,213
- Demonym: Faiano
- Time zone: UTC+1 (CET)
  - Summer (DST): UTC+2 (CEST)
- Postal code: 84098
- Dialing code: (+39) 089
- Patron saint: St. Benedict
- Website: Official website

Faiano is an Italian town and hamlet (frazione) of the municipality of Pontecagnano Faiano in the province of Salerno, Campania region. Along with the main town of Pontecagnano it is de jure the secondary seat of its municipality.

== History ==
Town's name derives from the word fajo, meaning beech in Neapolitan, and is referred to a beechwood.

Located on an area rich of thermal waters, still known in Ancient Roman era, the town counts a spring named Sette Bocche (Seven Mouths). 1 km from its center, but in the municipal territory of Montecorvino Pugliano, there are located some ancient Thermae (40.66412°N 14.91956°E) with a spring of sulphurous water.

== Geography ==
Faiano is a hilltown that lies on the road linking Pontecagnano (4 km) to Montecorvino Pugliano (5,5 km) and the village of Santa Tecla (3 km). It is located below the Picentini mountain range and the homonym regional park. The town is 1,5 km far from the nearby village of Baroncino, 12 from Salerno, 7,5 from Bellizzi, 10 from Battipaglia and 9 from Giffoni Valle Piana, with which it is connected by a road passing the village of Ornito.

== Gallery ==
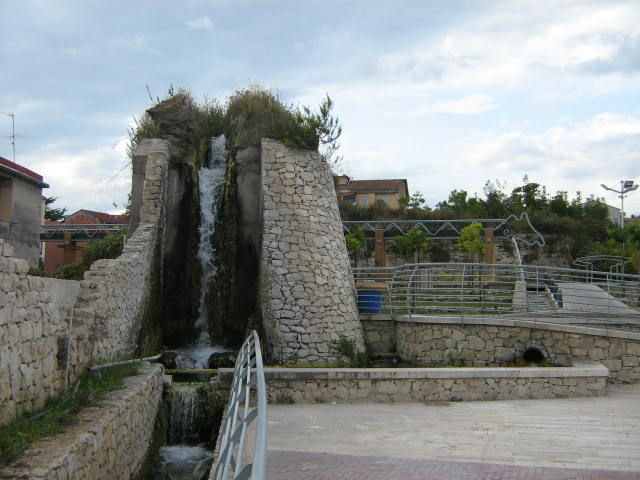
Aqueduct park in town's centre

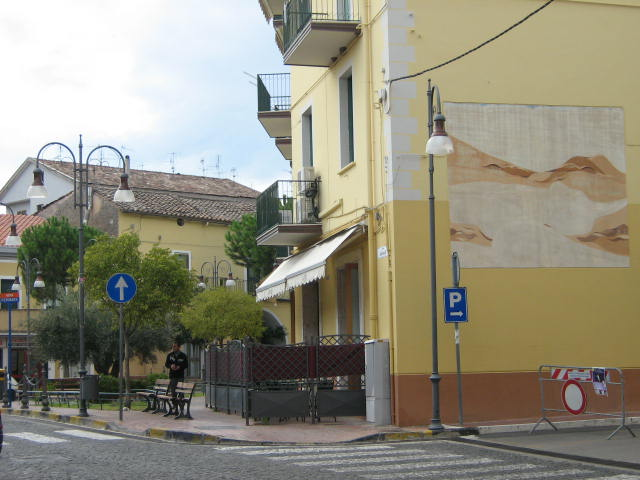
The central Garibaldi Square

== Transport ==
Faiano is not served by railways but the nearest station is Pontecagnano, on the Salerno-Reggio Calabria line. Nearest motorway exits are "Pontecagnano" and "Montecorvino Pugliano" on the A2 Motorway Salerno-Reggio Calabria. 7 km from the town is located the Salerno-Pontecagnano Airport Costa d'Amalfi.
