= Montecorvino Rovella =

- Comune
- Comune di Montecorvino Rovella
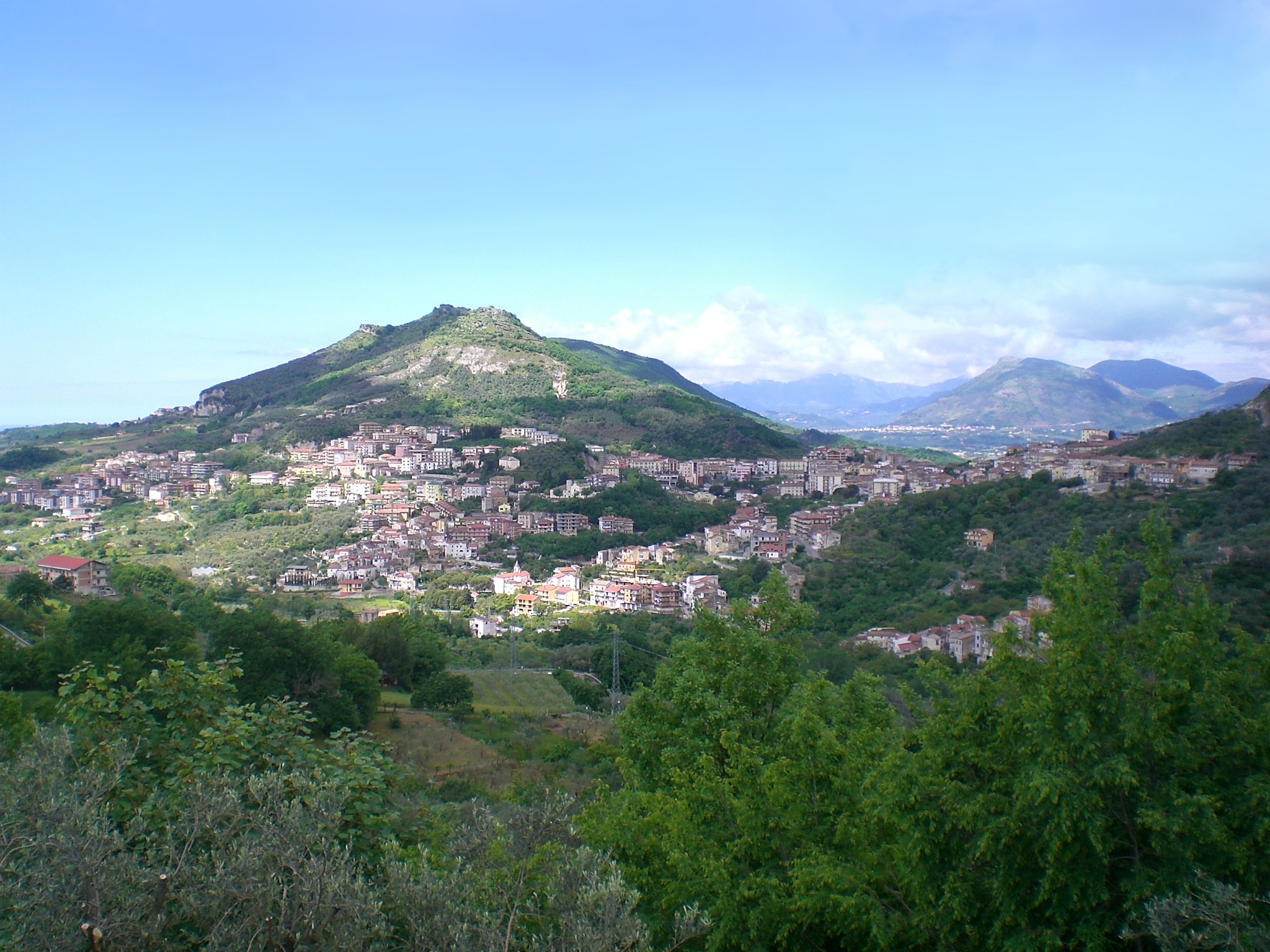

- Coat of arms

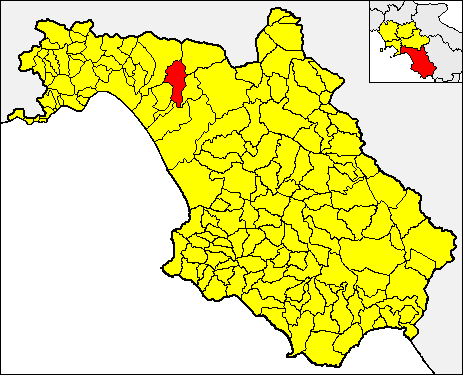
- Montecorvino Rovella within the Province of Salerno and Campania

- Location within Italy Location within Campania
- Coordinates: 40°41′45.3″N 14°58′31.6″E
- Country: Italy
- Region: Campania
- Province: Salerno (SA)
- Frazioni: Chiarelli, Cornea, Ferrari, Gauro, Macchia, Marangi, Martorano, Molenadi (Sant'Eustachio), Nuvola, Occiano, San Lazzaro, San Martino, Votraci

Government
  - Mayor: Martino D'Onofrio

Area
  - Total: 42.16 km^{2} (16.28 sq mi)
- Elevation: 220 m (720 ft)

Population (30 November 2017)
  - Total: 12,677
  - Density: 300.7/km^{2} (778.8/sq mi)
- Demonym: Montecorvinesi
- Time zone: UTC+1 (CET)
  - Summer (DST): UTC+2 (CEST)
- Postal code: 84096 (communal seat), 84090 (frazioni)
- Dialing code: 089
- Patron saint: Sts. Peter and Paul
- Saint day: 29 June
- Website: Official website

Montecorvino Rovella (Campanian: Ruella) is a town and comune in the province of Salerno in the Campania region of south-west Italy.

== History ==
In 269 BC the Romans defeated the Picentes from the Adriatic Coast and founded a colony transplanting them forcedly in Campania, in the town of Picenza. After a rebellion in 89 BC, and the subsequent Roman victory, the Picentini survivors were forced to not rebuild a single town, but a series of villages, easily controllable in case of further riots. One of them was Montecorvino (Mons Corvinus). Until 1820 it included the village of Pugliano and, until 1990, the frazione of Bellizzi.

In 1970, an early medieval church of Sant-Ambrogio, dating to the ninth century, was rediscovered. It is currently being studied by a project based in the Universities of Birmingham (UK) and Salerno (Italy)

== Geography ==
Montecorvino is a hilltown surrounded by the Picentini mountain range, included into the Monti Picentini Regional Park. It borders with the municipalities of Acerno, Battipaglia, Bellizzi, Giffoni Valle Piana, Montecorvino Pugliano and Olevano sul Tusciano.

== Transport ==
The town is served by the state highway SS 164 and by several provincial roads. Nearest motorway exit (12 km south) is "Montecorvino Pugliano" on the A2. Nearest railway station (11 km south) is "Montecorvino-Bellizzi", originally named only "Montecorvino Rovella", located in the town and former frazione of Bellizzi. Montecorvino is also 15 km north of Salerno-Pontecagnano Airport.

== Notable people ==
- John of Montecorvino (1247-1328), Franciscan missionary, traveller and statesman.
- Luca Gaurico (1475-1558), astrologer, astronomer and mathematician.
- Robert Picardo (born 1953), American actor and singer with Italian heritage, with his father's family originating from Montecorvino and his mother's parents originally from Bomba, in Abruzzo.

== See also ==
- Tusciano
