= Salerno metropolitan railway service =

- The logo of metros in Italy used for Metro Salerno too
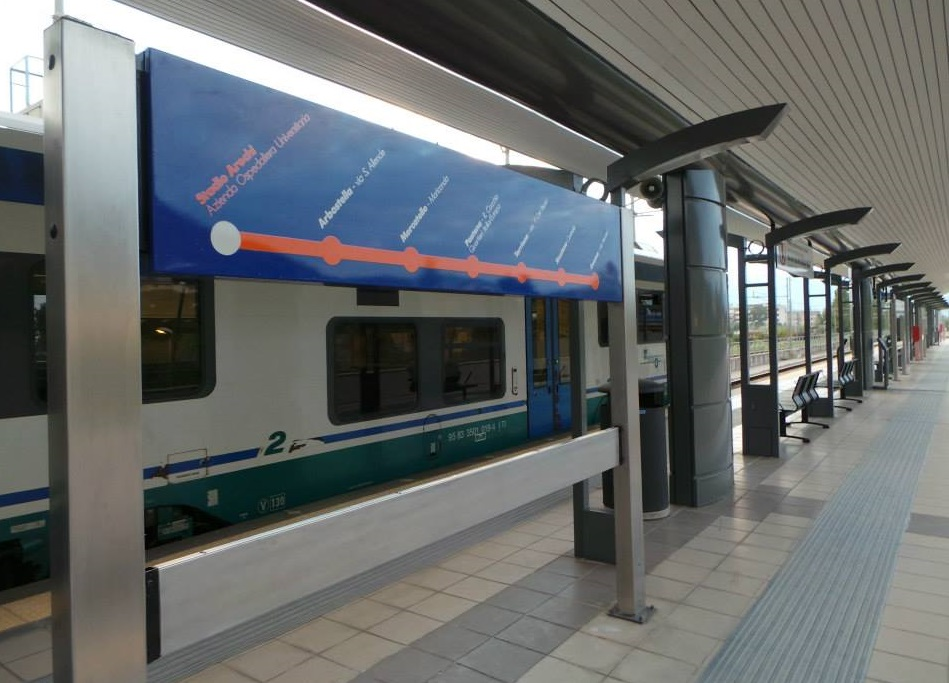
- A train and a route map at Arechi station

Overview
- Locale: Salerno
- Transit type: commuter rail
- Number of lines: 1
- Number of stations: 6

Operation
- Began operation: 4 November 2013
- Operator: Trenitalia
- Number of vehicles: ALe 501/ALe 502

Technical
- Track gauge: 1,435 mm (4 ft 8 1/2 in)
- Electrification: 3 kV, overhead line
- Average speed: 30 km/h
System map

The Salerno metropolitan railway service is a commuter rail system operated by Trenitalia, serving the Italian city of Salerno. It is composed by a 5.66 km-long line with 6 stations, extending from the central station to the Arechi Stadium, and is commonly known as Metro Salerno.

== History ==
=== Overview ===
The idea to build an urban railway serving Salerno started in the 1980s and, between 1996 and 2004, several institutions signed and renewed agreements for the allocation of funds. The works for the service, officially named "Metropolitan railway system of the Salerno conurbation", started in early 2000s, and the line opened on 4 November 2013. Between April and June 2014 the service was suspended, due to a lack of funds.

=== Planned extensions ===
Salerno Duomo-Via Vernieri station, opened in September 2002 on the Naples–Salerno line, was originally built as part of the western section (from Salerno station) of the line. The planned extension will end at a western terminal of Via Monti (or Centro Storico Alto), also located in Salerno.

A further extension, that will run eastbound from Arechi to Pontecagnano station and Salerno Airport, has been planned, with the stations of Fuorni-Zona Industriale, Scavata Case Rosse (both in Salerno), Pontecagnano and Pontecagnano Aeroporto.

== Route ==
The line starts at Salerno station, an interchange hub with regional and long-distance trains, and runs eastbound along the Salerno–Reggio Calabria line with a parallel and electrified single track. The eastern terminus, Arechi, is located between the homonym stadium and the Ruggi Hospital. Due to its location in the quarter of San Leonardo, it is also known as San Leonardo-Stadio Arechi.

All the secondary stations have a single platform. The ones with two tracks, Torrione, Mercatello and Arechi, have an island platform.

Station	Km	Tracks	Notes
Salerno	0.00	11	FS interchange service, urban and suburban buses secondary name: Stazione Centrale
(Salerno) Torrione	1.56	2	secondary name: Via P. del Pezzo
(Salerno) Pastena	2.60	1	secondary name: R. Cocchia-Quartieri Italia/Europa
(Salerno) Mercatello	3.25	2	secondary name: Mariconda
(Salerno) Arbostella	4.50	1	secondary name: Via S. Allende
(Salerno) Arechi	5.66	2	secondary name: San Leonardo-Ospedale

== Services ==
The service, operated by "Minuetto" DMU trains (ALe 501/ALe 502), starts at about 6:21 am and ends at about 23:12. The trains run, with some exceptions, each 30 minutes, for a total of 29 daily departures from each terminus (Salerno and Arechi).

The trains are classified as "Regional" and almost all the journeys are limited to the metro route. Some of them continue towards Mercato San Severino, on the Salerno–Mercato San Severino line, linking the metro with other Salerno's minor stations: Salerno Irno, Fratte and Fratte Villa Comunale.

== Gallery ==
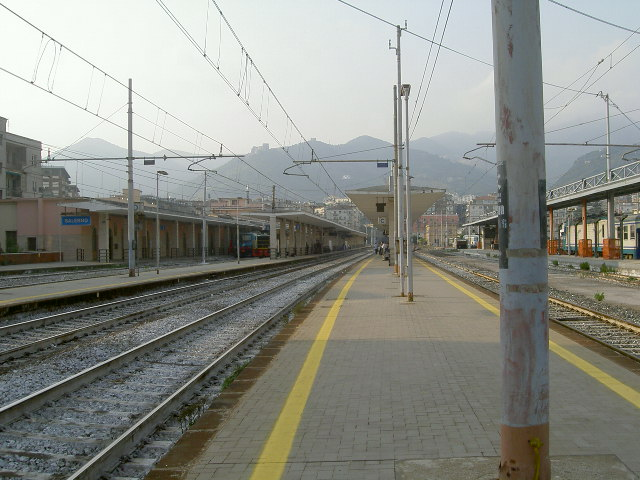
Salerno station in 2004: to the right, the shelter (under construction) for the metro platform

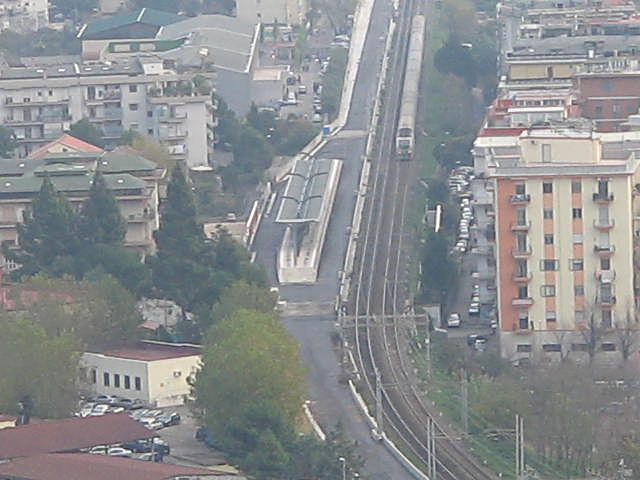
Torrione station building site, without platforms, in 2007

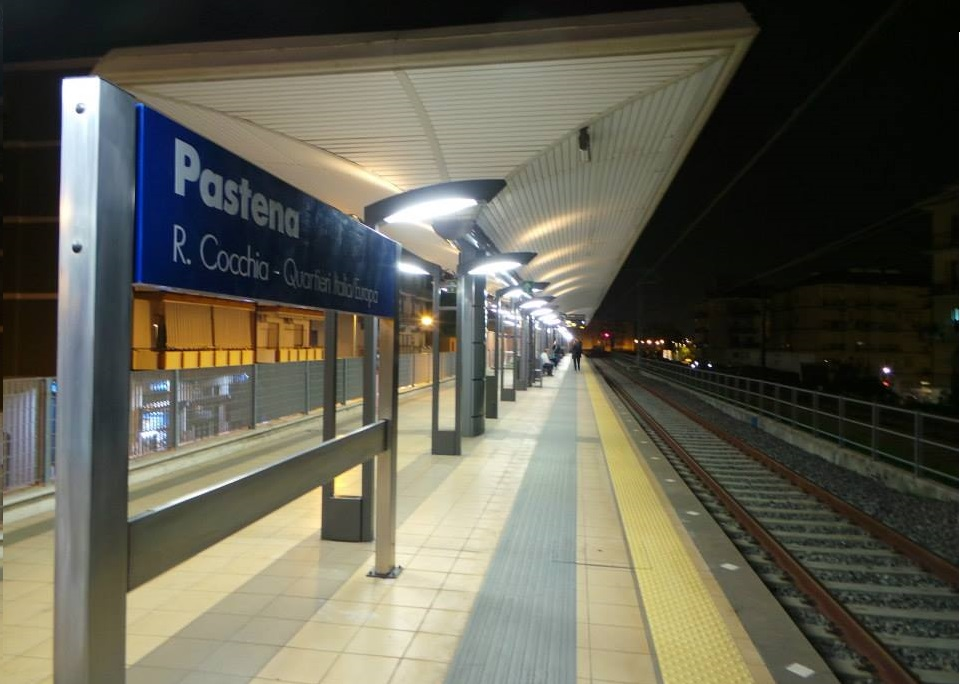
Pastena station platform
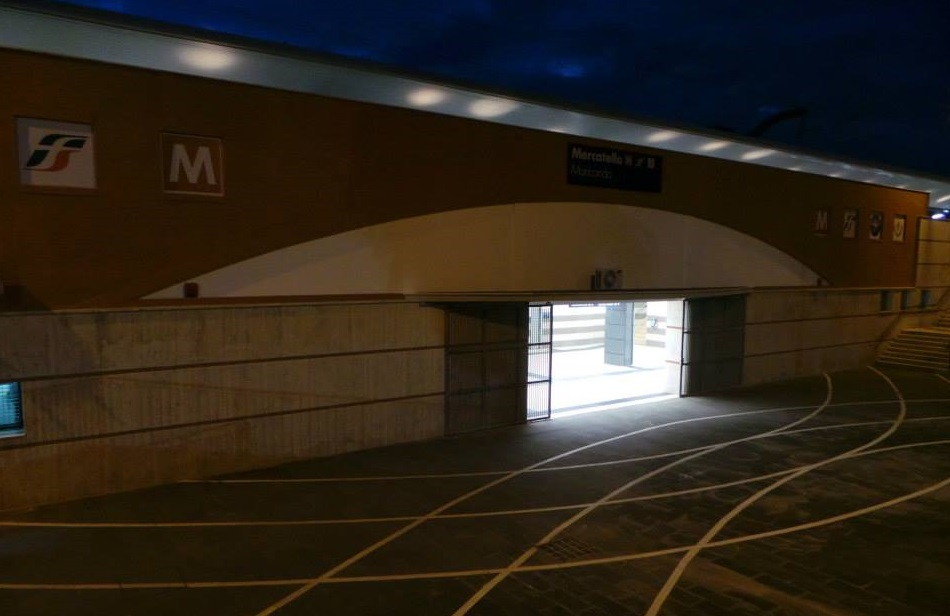
Mercatello station building

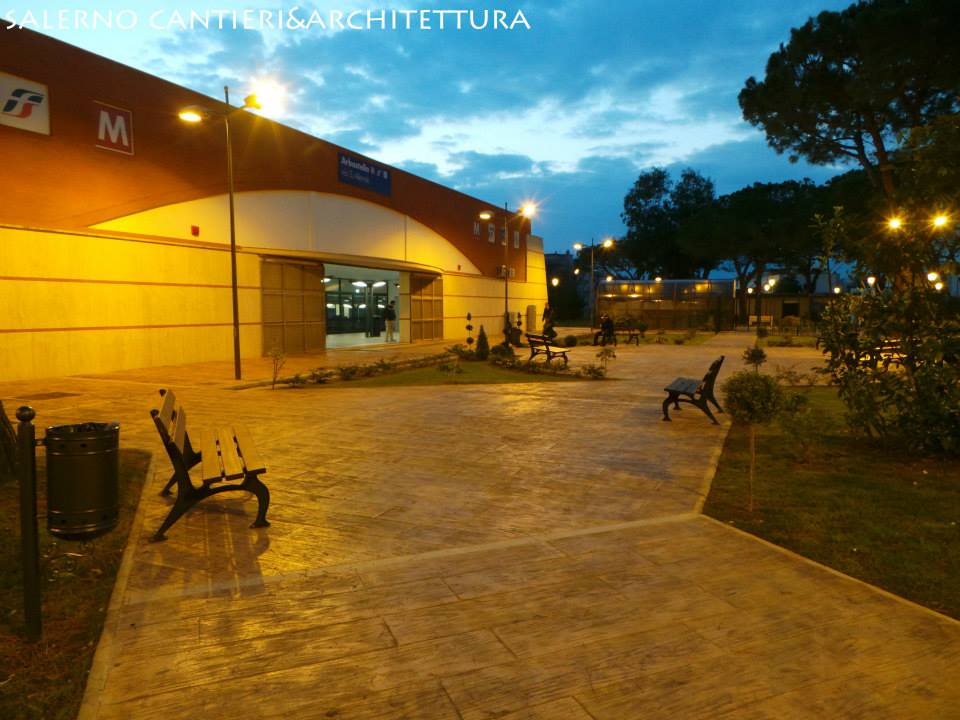
Arbostella station building

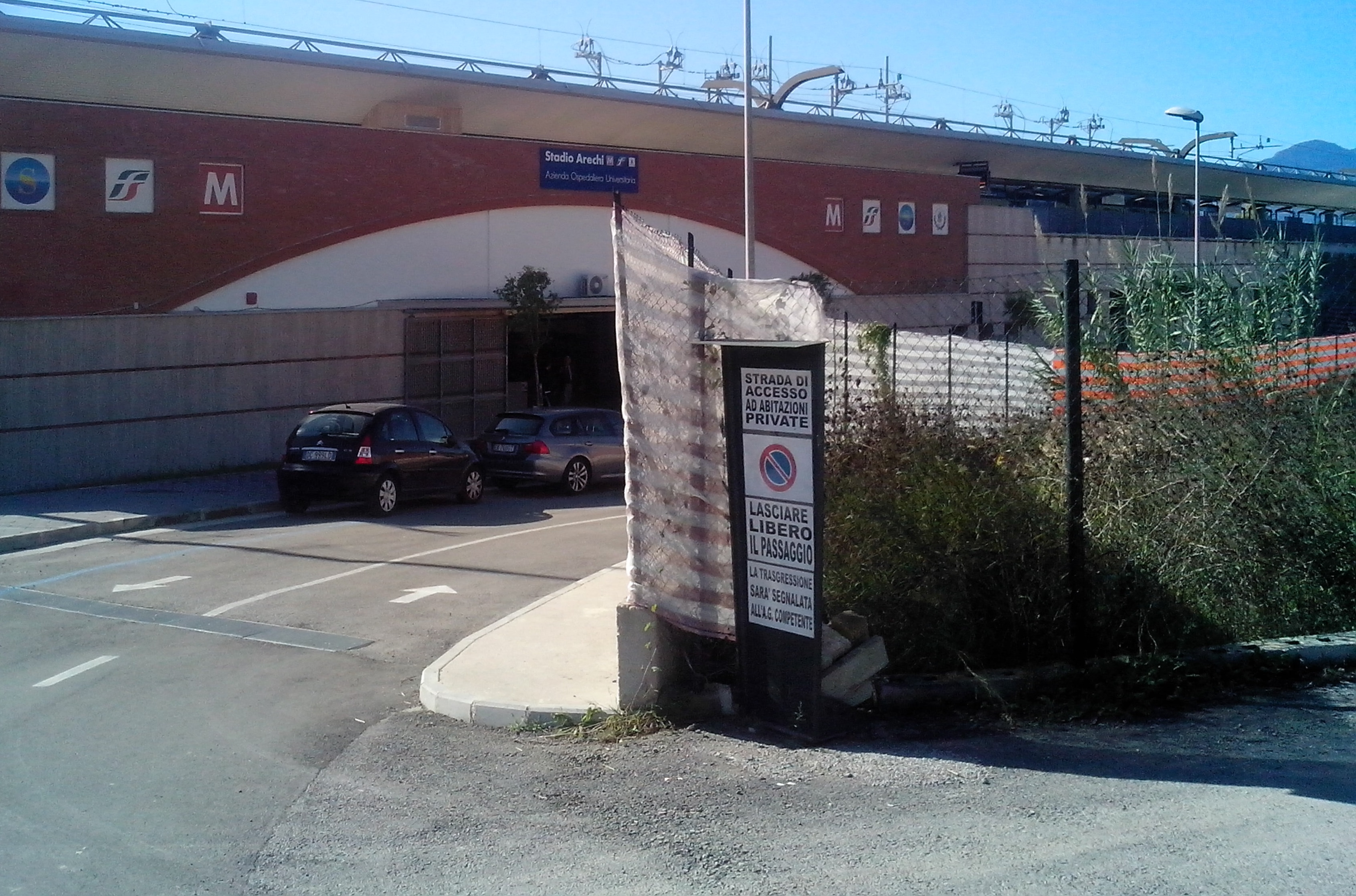
Arechi station building

== See also ==
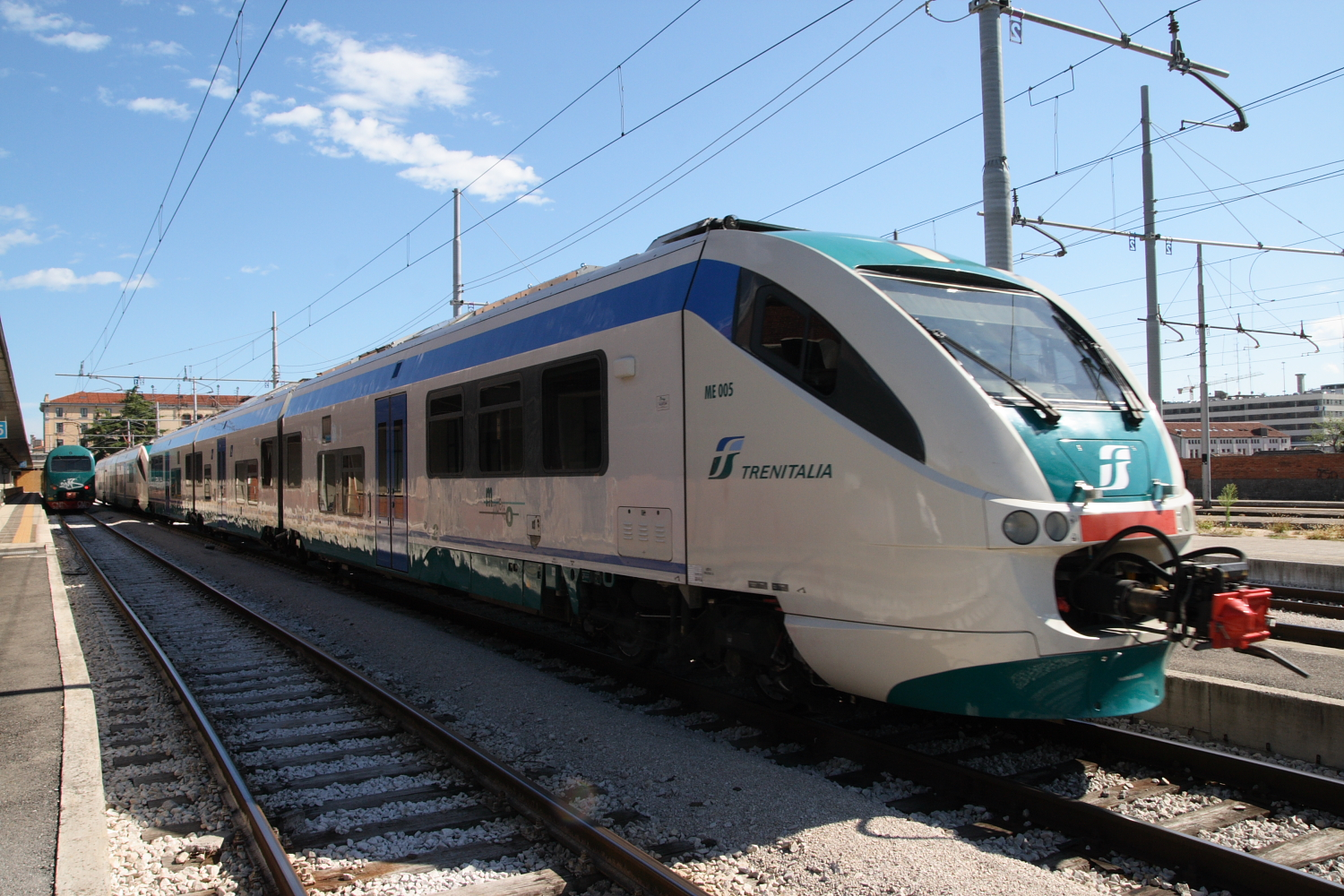
A "Minuetto" train in Venice Santa Lucia station

- S-train
- Commuter rail
- Rapid transit
- Naples Metro
