= Pasquale De Sarlo =

Italian footballer

Personal information
- Date of birth: 6 May 1999 (age 27)
- Place of birth: Battipaglia, Italy
- Height: 1.86 m (6 ft 1 in)
- Position: Forward

Youth career
- –2017: Avellino
- 2017–2019: Salernitana

Senior career*
Years	Team	Apps	(Gls)
2019–2020	Rieti	17	(2)
2020–2021	Casertana	2	(0)
2021–2023	Imolese	30	(1)
2023	Taranto	0	(0)
- * Club domestic league appearances and goals as of 3 September 2023

Pasquale De Sarlo (born 6 May 1999) is an Italian professional footballer who plays as a forward.

== Club career ==
Born in Battipaglia, De Sarlo started his career in Avellino and Salernitana youth sector.

In 2019, he joined to Serie C club Rieti for the 2019–20 season. De Sarlo made his professional debut on 24 August 2019 against Ternana.

For the next season, on 21 August 2020 he moved to Casertana.

On 13 August 2021, he signed with Imolese.

On 3 July 2023, De Sarlo joined Taranto on a one-year contract.

== Personal life ==
His father Antonio is the president of Imolese Calcio 1919 since July 2014. De Sarlo graduated in Business Administration.
