= National Archeologic Museum of Pontecagnano =

National Archeological Museum of Pontecagnano
- Museo archeologico nazionale di Pontecagnano
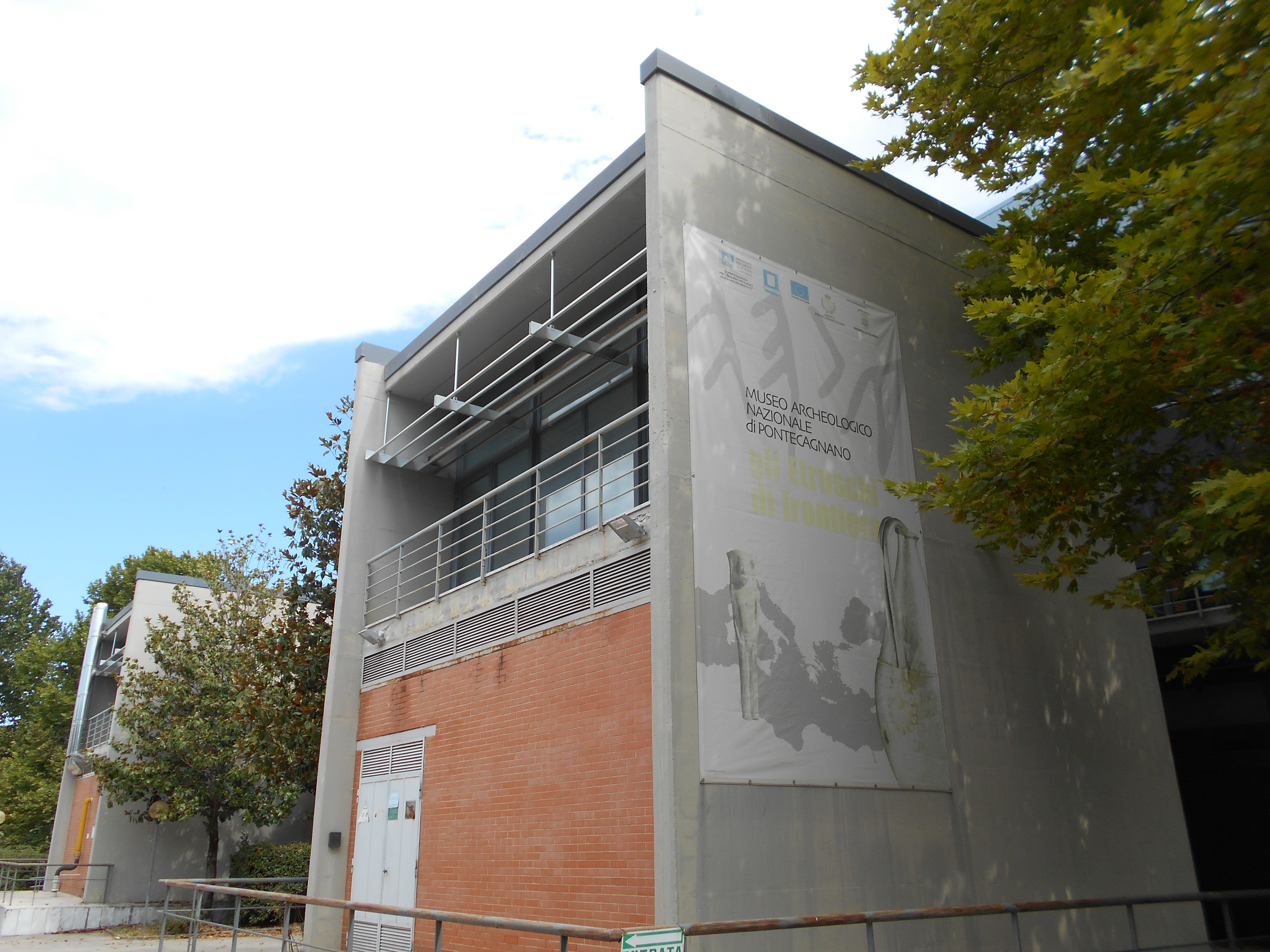
- The facade of the museum
- Location: Via Lucania, 55/29, 84098 Pontecagnano Faiano SA
- Coordinates: 48°38′28″N 14°52′51″E
- Type: archaeology
- Director: Luigina Tomay

The Pontecagnano National Archaeological Museum is a museum in Pontecagnano Faiano, in the province of Salerno, Italy that opened in 2007. Since December 2014, the museum has been managed by the Campania Museum Complex.

== History ==
The museum houses archaeological material found during the excavations of an ancient Villanovan settlement perhaps called "Amina" on which rose the ancient Picentia and the funerary assemblages of about 9,000 tombs of the necropolis discovered in the area, dating from 3000 BCE to the third century CE.

With the systematic excavation of the necropolis started by Bruno D'Agostino in 1962, a new chapter of the ancient history of Campania has opened. The vast necropolis, which, from the end of the 10th to the beginning of the 9th century BCE, was distributed around a large living space, are the most eloquent testimony of the expansion of Etruscan people in southern Italy in advance and then in conjunction with the process of Greek colonization of the coastal strip. The great center of Pontecagnano constitutes the most advanced point of that expansion and, at least since the end of the 6th century BCE had true urban characteristics. The considerable quantity of imported objects found in the funerary objects, both from the Greek and Near Eastern world and from the Greek and Italian ones, testify to its function as an emporion and its cultural richness.

The realization of the museum, which illustrates in a strictly scientific but at the same time suggestive and attractive, the evidence returned by the ancient settlement, comes from an intense and profitable collaboration between the Superintendence for Archaeological Heritage of the provinces of Salerno, Avellino and Benevento, the University of Naples "l'Orientale" and the University of Salerno. The Museum has been created for functional lots thanks to the funding assured in all these years by the Ministry for Cultural Assets and Activities and by the Campania region, while the Municipality of Pontecagnano has acquired the land on which the new building is located.

The museum itinerary opens with a section dedicated to Prehistory and the introductory panel summarizes, on the one hand, the stages of the evolution of prehistoric communities in the succession of different eras, on the other, the transformations of the landscape in the Piana del Sele.

The exhibition itinerary is organized chronologically in six sections:

- Prehistory - The Eneolithic Period (3500-2300 BCE)
- The Early Iron Age (9th - 8th Century BCE)
- The city of princes - The orientalizing period (late 8th - 7th Century BCE)
- The archaic city (6th Century BCE)
- The classical and Hellenistic periods (5th-4th Century BCE)
- The Roman period (3rd Century BCE - 5th Century CE)
