= Salerno railway station =

Railway station in Salerno, Italy

Salerno
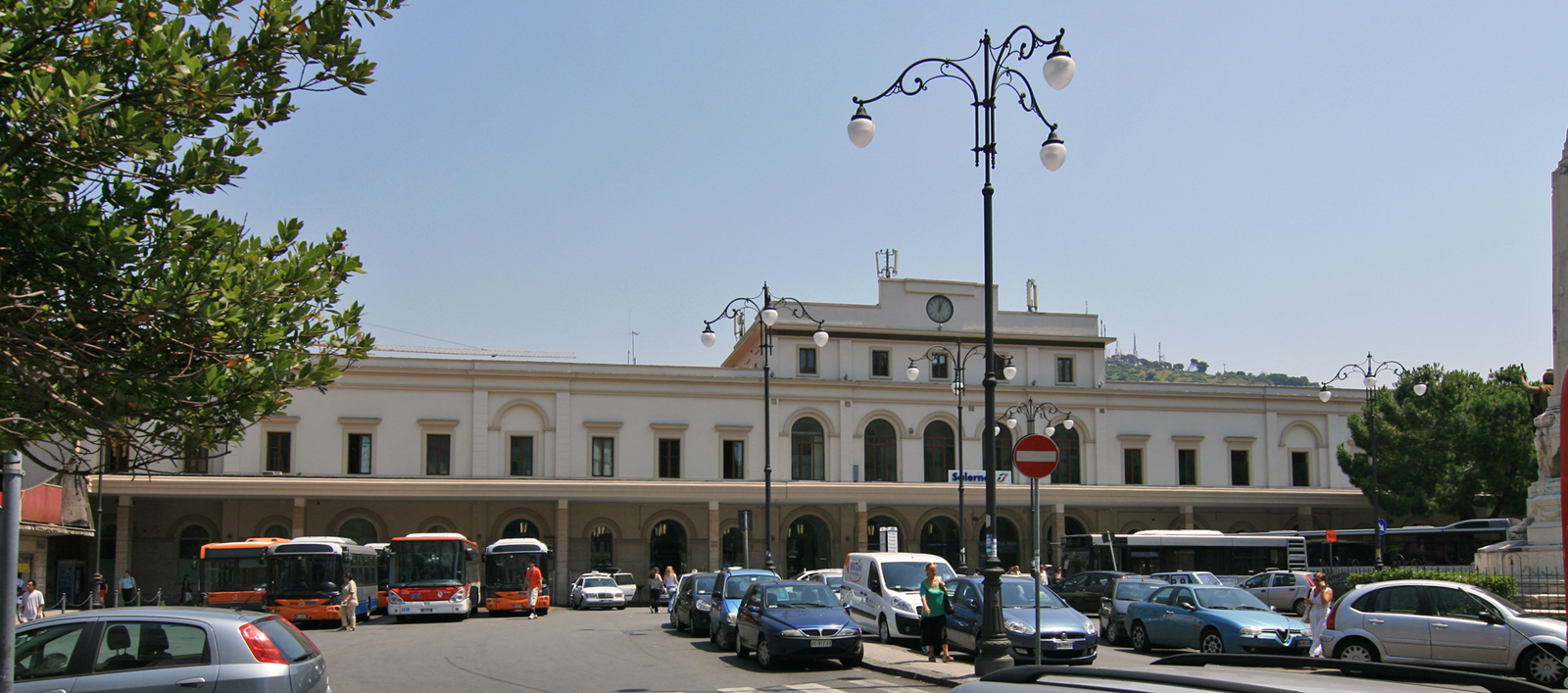
- Exterior of the station building.

General information
- Location: Piazza Vittorio Veneto; 84100 Salerno; Italy
- Coordinates: 40°41′00″N 14°46′00″E
- Owner: Rete Ferroviaria Italiana
- Operator: Centostazioni
- Lines: Naples–Salerno; Salerno–Reggio Calabria; Salerno–Mercato San Severino; Salerno Metro
- Distance: 53.090 km (32.989 mi) from Napoli Centrale
- Platforms: 5 (11 tracks)
- Connections: Salerno Suburban Railway

Other information
- IATA code: ISR

History
- Opened: 1866

Services
Preceding station	Trenitalia	Following station
Firenze Campo di Marte towards Milano Centrale	InterCity Notte; Milan–Syracuse	Battipaglia towards Siracusa
Location
- Location within Campania Location within Italy

Salerno railway station serves the Italian city of Salerno and was opened in 1866. It is the main railway station of the city.

== Overview ==
It is located at the junction of several lines, including two major national lines, the Naples–Salerno line and the Salerno–Reggio Calabria line. It is also served by the to Mercato San Severino. In addition, it is served by regional trains operating over the old Salerno–Nocera Inferiore via Cava de' Tirreni line, which was part of the Naples–Salerno line before the construction of the Santa Lucia tunnel.

== Gallery ==
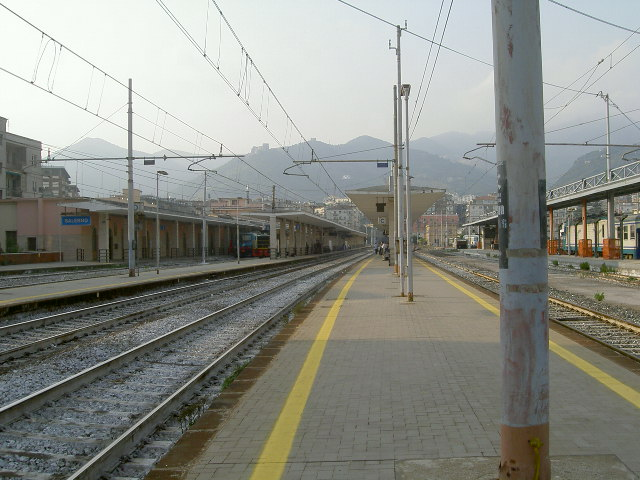
View of the platforms

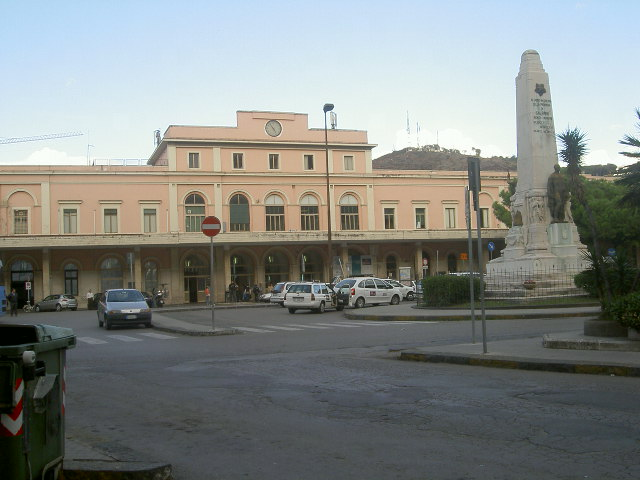
Station building and the column of Vittorio Veneto Square

== Train connections ==
Salerno station is an important hub for regional and long-distance trains within the national territory. It is served by several high speed trains, InterCity and Express services, linking it to almost all the main Italian cities. Starting from 4 November 2013 the station is also served by a suburban railway named "Metro Salerno", linking it to the city's eastern suburb, for which it has been projected a western expansion and a future link to Salerno-Pontecagnano Airport.

The following trains call at this station: (incomplete)

- High speed trains (Frecciarossa) Turin - Milan - Bologna - Florence - Rome - Naples - Salerno
- High speed trains (Frecciargento) Rome - Naples - Salerno - Lamezia Terme - Reggio Calabria
- High speed trains (Frecciabianca) Rome - Naples - Salerno - Sapri - Lamezia - Vibo Valentia - Reggio Calabria
- High speed trains (Italo) Turin - Milan - Bologna - Florence - Rome - Naples - Salerno
- High speed trains (Italo) Venice - Padua - Bologna - Florence - Rome - Naples - Salerno
- Intercity trains Rome - Naples - Salerno - Taranto
- Night train (Intercity Notte) Turin - Milan - Bologna - Florence - Rome - Naples - Salerno - Lamezia Terme - Reggio di Calabria
- Regional trains (Treno regionale) Naples - Salerno - Potenza - Metaponto - Taranto

== See also ==
- Salerno metropolitan railway service
- History of rail transport in Italy
- List of railway stations in Campania
- Rail transport in Italy
- Railway stations in Italy
