= Bellizzi =

- Comune
- Comune di Bellizzi
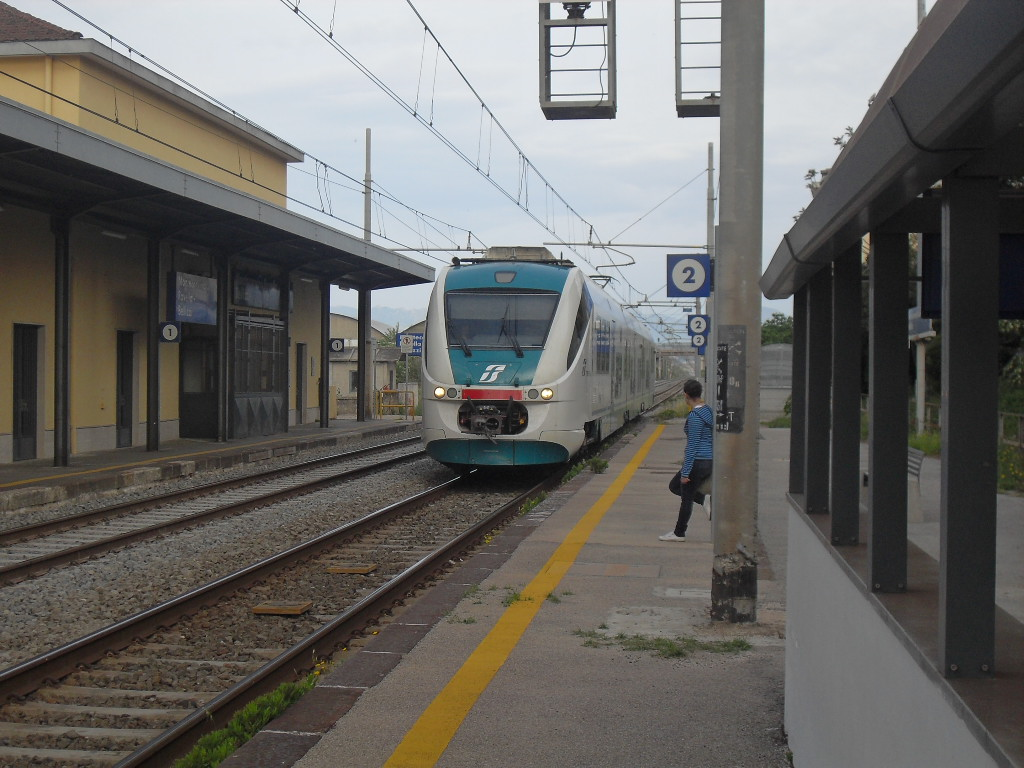
- Montecorvino station in Bellizzi

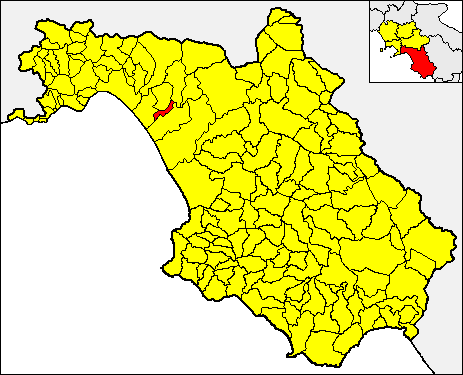
- Bellizzi within the Province of Salerno

- Location of Bellizzi in Italy Bellizzi (Campania)
- Coordinates: 40°37′N 14°57′E
- Country: Italy
- Region: Campania
- Province: Salerno (SA)
- Frazioni: Bivio Pratole, Bivio San Vito, Fabbrica Nuova, Olmo, Serroni

Government
  - Mayor: Domenico Volpe (Città Possibile)

Area
  - Total: 8.02 km^{2} (3.10 sq mi)
- Elevation: 60 m (200 ft)

Population (28 February 2017)
  - Total: 13,609
  - Density: 1,700/km^{2} (4,390/sq mi)
- Demonym: Bellizzesi
- Time zone: UTC+1 (CET)
  - Summer (DST): UTC+2 (CEST)
- Postal code: 84092
- Dialing code: 0828
- ISTAT code: 065158
- Patron saint: Sacred Heart of Jesus
- Website: Official website

Bellizzi is a town and comune in the province of Salerno in the Campania region of south-western Italy.

== History ==
Bellizzi was a frazione of Montecorvino Rovella until 2 January 1990, when it became a comune following a referendum held in 1988.

== Geography ==
Bellizzi borders with the municipalities of Battipaglia, Montecorvino Pugliano, Montecorvino Rovella and Pontecagnano Faiano. It is 3 km far from Battipaglia, 5 from Macchia, 6 from Pontecagnano, 11 from Montecorvino Rovella and 20 from Salerno.

== Transport ==
Bellizzi is crossed by the national highway SS 18 and by the A2 motorway, with nearest exits in Battipaglia and Montecorvino Pugliano. It is served by the railway station of Montecorvino and the Salerno Costa d'Amalfi Airport is 3 km far from it.
