= Naples–Salerno railway =

Railway line in Italy

The Naples–Salerno railway line is a major railway line in the Italian rail network, forming a link in the main trunk line to southern Italy. The first nine kilometres from Naples to Portici was the first railway in Italy, opened on 3 October 1839. It was extended to Torre Annunziata Centrale on 2 August 1842, Nocera Inferiore on 19 May 1844. The line was extended to Cava de' Tirreni on 31 July 1858, Vietri sul Mare on 1 August 1860 and Salerno on 20 May 1866.

Passenger traffic is denser between Angri and Salerno, as the towns between Naples and Scafati are also served by the intensive commuter services on the Circumvesuviana. High-speed and long distant trains between Naples/Rome and Salerno operate over the Naples–Salerno high-speed line, which opened in May 2008.
