= Montecorvino Pugliano =

- Comune
- Comune di Montecorvino Pugliano
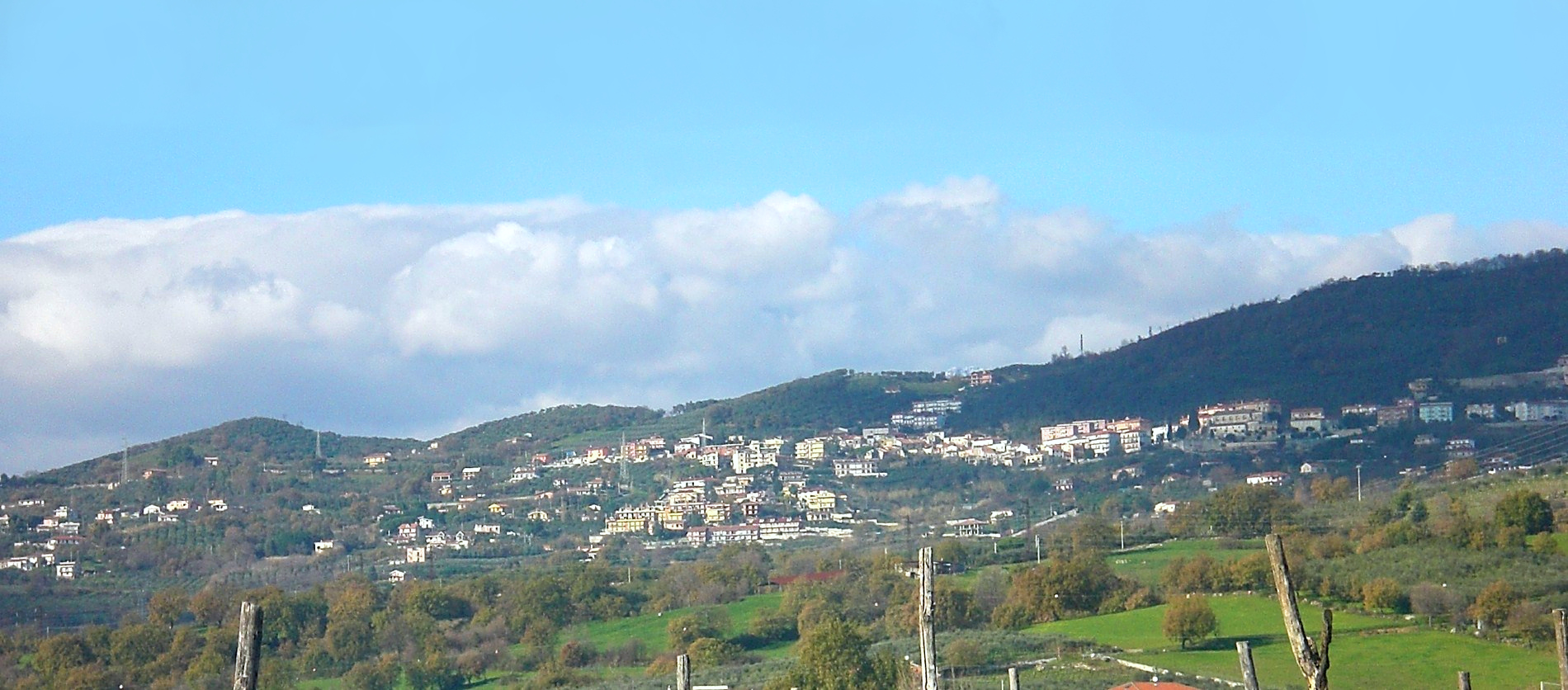
- View of Pugliano.

- Coat of arms

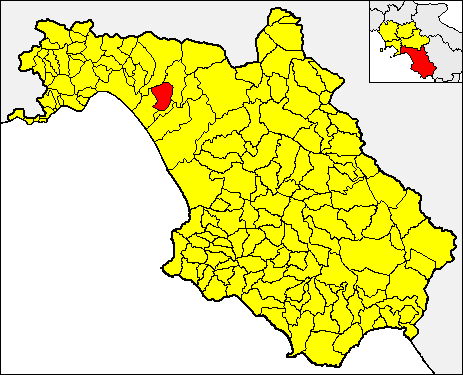
- Montecorvino Pugliano within the Province of Salerno and Campania

- Location within Italy Location within Campania
- Coordinates: 40°41′N 14°57′E
- Country: Italy
- Region: Campania
- Province: Salerno (SA)
- Frazioni: Bivio Pratole, Pagliarone, Pugliano, Santa Tecla, San Vito, Torello

Government
  - Mayor: Alessandro Chiola (vice-mayor)

Area
  - Total: 28.88 km^{2} (11.15 sq mi)
- Elevation: 42 m (138 ft)

Population (30 November 2017)
  - Total: 10,850
  - Density: 375.7/km^{2} (973.0/sq mi)
- Demonym(s): Puglianesi, Santateclesi
- Time zone: UTC+1 (CET)
  - Summer (DST): UTC+2 (CEST)
- Postal code: 84090
- Dialing code: 089
- Patron saint: St. Bernardino of Siena
- Saint day: 20 May
- Website: Official website

Montecorvino Pugliano is a town and comune in the province of Salerno in the Campania region of south-west Italy. The communal seat is in Pugliano; no settlement in the municipality is called "Montecorvino", a toponym related to the nearby commune of Montecorvino Rovella.

== Geography ==
Montecorvino borders with the municipalities of Bellizzi, Giffoni Valle Piana, Montecorvino Rovella and Pontecagnano Faiano.

It includes the frazioni of Pugliano (seat), Bivio Pratole, Pagliarone, Santa Tecla, San Vito and Torello.

== Main sights ==
In south of Santa Tecla, near the road linking the village to Faiano, there are some ancient Roman thermae (40.66412°N 14.91956°E) with a spring of sulphurous water.
