= Pontecagnano Faiano =

- Comune
- Comune di Pontecagnano Faiano
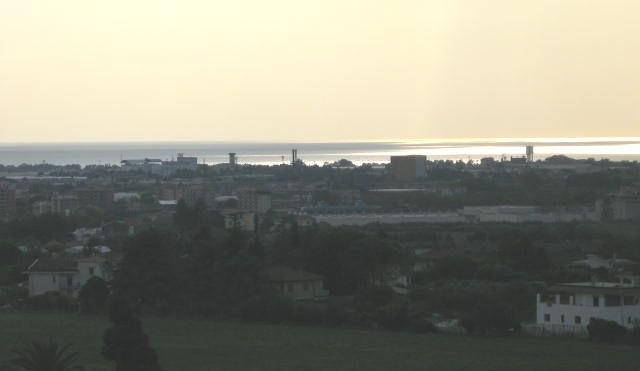
- Panoramic view of Pontecagnano

- Coat of arms

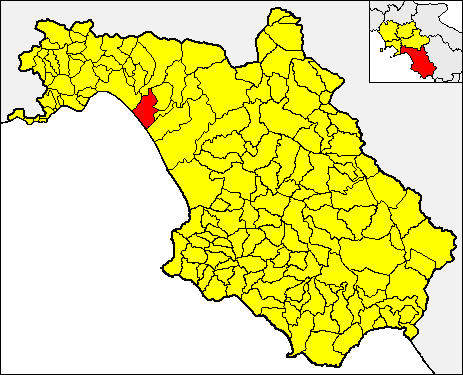
- Pontecagnano within the Province of Salerno

- Location within Italy Location within Campania
- Coordinates: 40°38′39.12″N 14°52′36.84″E
- Country: Italy
- Region: Campania
- Province: Salerno (SA)
- Frazioni: Baroncino, Corvinia, Faiano, Magazzeno, Pagliarone, Picciola, Sant'Antonio a Picenzia

Government
  - Mayor: Giuseppe Lanzara (PD)

Area
  - Total: 37.19 km^{2} (14.36 sq mi)
- Elevation: 10 m (33 ft)

Population (31-3-2022)
  - Total: 26,198
  - Density: 704.4/km^{2} (1,824/sq mi)
- Demonym: Pontecagnanesi
- Time zone: UTC+1 (CET)
  - Summer (DST): UTC+2 (CEST)
- Postal code: 84098
- Dialing code: 089
- Website: Official website

Pontecagnano Faiano (also known simply as Pontecagnano) is a town and comune of the province of Salerno in the Campania region of south-west Italy. The area dates back to Roman times when the city of Picentia stood in its place and was destroyed by the Romans after the Second Punic War.

== Geography ==
Located in the south-eastern suburb of Salerno, the municipality is formed by the towns of Pontecagnano (the main center and municipal seat), Faiano (a small hill town, secondary seat), and by the villages of Baroncino, Corvinia, Magazzeno, Pagliarone, Picciola, and Sant'Antonio a Picenzia. It borders with Battipaglia, Bellizzi, Giffoni Valle Piana, Montecorvino Pugliano, and Salerno.

The town of Pontecagnano is the municipal seat and the most populated settlement of the comune. It is situated close to the urban area of Salerno and a few kilometers from the coast.

The village of Faiano, the co-official administrative seat, is located a few kilometers from Pontecagnano on the hills, on the road to Montecorvino Pugliano, next to the Monti Picentini. It is locally known for its abundance of water sources.

The civil parishes include Magazzeno (by the coast), Picciola (close to the airport of Salerno), Sant'Antonio a Picenzia (close to Pontecagnano), and Baroncino (between Pontecagnano and Faiano).

== History ==
The area of Pontecagnano was settled as early as the Copper Age (3500-2300 BC), as evidenced by archaeological excavations that have uncovered two sanctuaries and two necropolises. In the 9th-8th centuries BC, remains belonging to the Villanovan Culture, the predecessor to the Etruscans, have been found.

The Etruscan center, possibly called Amina, emerged in the 6th century BC. At the height of its power, it ruled over the land extending from Salerno to the Sele River. The town was known for a temple dedicated to the Argive Juno, which was reputedly built by Jason. In 268 BC, the Romans established a new town called Picentia in the area to accommodate a nucleus of deported Picentini.

During the Middle Ages, the area declined in importance, and much of the population migrated to higher, more defensible areas such as Faiano. In more recent centuries, Pontecagnano Faiano saw significant development, particularly in agriculture and industry, benefiting from its proximity to Salerno.

== Economy ==
Pontecagnano Faiano has a diverse economy based on agriculture, industry, and services. The fertile plains in the surrounding areas support the cultivation of vegetables, fruits, and olives. The town has also developed an industrial sector, particularly in the production of construction materials and metalworking. The commercial sector is growing, driven by its proximity to Salerno and the increasing number of businesses in the area.

== Landmarks and culture ==
The town is home to several historical and cultural landmarks:

- National Archaeological Museum of Pontecagnano, which houses artifacts from the Etruscan and Roman periods.
- Church of St. Benedict, a historic religious structure.
- Villa Pignatelli, a noble residence.
- The ruins of Picentia, which include remnants of the ancient Roman settlement.

== Transportation ==
The town is well connected to nearby cities and regions:

- The Salerno Costa d'Amalfi Airport, located near Pontecagnano, facilitates air travel.
- The town has a railway station on the Battipaglia-Salerno line, providing train connections to major destinations.
- The A2 motorway and other regional roads ensure easy access to Salerno, Naples, and other parts of Campania.

== Notable People ==
Enzo Maresca: former footballer and current manager of Manchester City.

== See also ==
- Salerno-Pontecagnano Airport
- National Archeologic Museum of Pontecagnano
