= Salerno Costa d'Amalfi Airport =

Airport in Campania, Italy

Salerno Costa d'Amalfi and Cilento Airport Aeroporto di Salerno Costa d'Amalfi e del Cilento
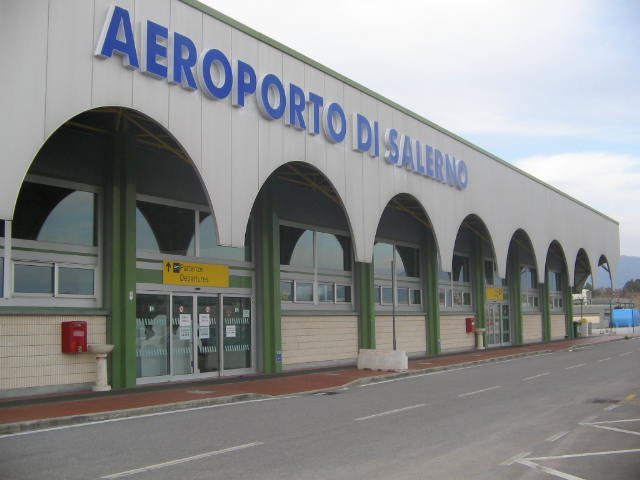
- IATA: QSR; ICAO: LIRI

Summary
- Airport type: Public / Military
- Owner/Operator: GE.S.A.C. S.p.A.
- Serves: Province of Salerno
- Location: Pontecagnano Faiano, Province of Salerno
- Opened: 1926
- Focus city for: Aeroitalia
- Elevation AMSL: 131 ft (40 m)
- Coordinates: 40°37′12″N 14°54′45″E
- Website: www.aeroportosalerno.it/en/

Map
- Location of the airport in Italy QSR/LIRI (Italy)

Runways
Direction	Length		Surface
Direction	ft	m	Surface
05/23	6,567	2,000	Asphalt

Statistics (2025)
- Passengers: 380,606

Salerno Costa d'Amalfi and Cilento Airport (IATA: QSR, ICAO: LIRI), is an Italian international airport located 13 miles southeast of the city of Salerno, between the municipalities of Bellizzi and Pontecagnano Faiano. It mainly serves the province of Salerno, including the Amalfi Coast and the Cilento area. It is also known as Salerno-Pontecagnano Airport.

== History ==
=== Early development ===
The airport was founded by the Aeronautica Militare, Italy's Air Force, in 1926. A flight training facility was in operation between 1933 and 1943. The first hangar was designed by Pier Luigi Nervi, a famous civil engineer. In 1946, a meteorological service was established, and in 1952, the Salerno Air Club was founded. The airport has hosted a Carabinieri helipad since 1975, and a Firefighter helipad and parachuting school since 1984. A new control tower was built in 1987. The airport was used exclusively by the Carabinieri, Vigili del Fuoco, flight and parachuting school and small private jets until 2007.

The airport was then upgraded to accommodate airline service, with four check-in desks, two boarding areas, and new luggage belts and waiting rooms being constructed. The runway has a VOR system and a lighting system. The runway's length was extended to 1,654 m (5,427 ft), and in 2011 a project was proposed for the extension of the runway up to 2,020 m (6,630 ft) and for the creation of new infrastructure and other improvements. The airport was subsequently closed in 2016.

=== Service resumption ===
In July 2024, the airport resumed scheduled passenger flights. easyJet and Volotea serve the airport with domestic and international routes. To accommodate large passenger aircraft, the runway has been extended to 2,000 metres (6,560 ft). The construction of a new terminal was planned for 2025, along with a runway extension to 2,200 m (7,220 ft), more parking spaces and a new general aviation terminal. The airport is expected to be fully operational in 2026 or 2027.

The new terminal, designed by Deerns Group, will have 5 gates (no jetbridges). Its design will let light pass through, creating an open space. It will also have photovoltaic panels on its roof to power the airport and will be built using entirely sustainable materials. The airport will have 8 parking spaces for aircraft and a plaza at the terminal's entrance.

== Airlines and destinations ==
The following airlines operate regular scheduled services at Salerno:

Airlines	Destinations
Aeroitalia	Genoa, Milan–Malpensa, Trieste, Turin; Seasonal: Ibiza, Mykonos, Palma de Mallorca, Santorini
Air Horizont	Seasonal charter: Rhodes, Zakynthos
Luxair	Seasonal: Luxembourg
Ryanair	Bergamo; Seasonal: Charleroi, London–Stansted
Volotea	Seasonal: Lyon, Nantes
Wizz Air	Seasonal: Budapest (begins 6 June 2027), Tirana (begins 6 June 2027), Warsaw–Modlin (begins 6 June 2027)

== Statistics ==
Year	Movements	Variation %	Passengers	Variation %
2008	588	Steady	18,067	Steady
2009	469	▼20.24	3,968	▼78.04
2010	1,049	▲123.67	5,163	▲30.12
2011	2,644	▲152.05	24,631	▲377.07
2012	1,553	▼41.26	8,797	▼64.28
2013	826	▼46,81	2,009	▼77,16
2014	832	▲0,7	2,245	▲11,07
2015	695	▼16,47	1,612	▼28,20
2016	142	▼79,57	2,923	▲81,33
2017	140	▼1,4	3,028	▲3,6
2018	4	▼97,1	141	▼95,3
2019	N/A	N/A	N/A	N/A
2020	4 728	Steady	11 295	Steady
2021	1 054	▼77,7	1 280	▼89,3
2022	275	▼73,9	0	▼100
2023	310	▲12,7	0	Steady
2024	3 170	▲922,58	179 123	Steady
2025	6 360	▲100,6	380 606	▲112,5
Total	21 965		446 590	

== Transport ==
=== Road ===
The airport can be reached via the Autostrada A2 SA-RC, exit Montecorvino Pugliano - Pontecagnano Sud as well as via the Tangenziale di Salerno, SS 18 "Pontecagnano" exit or SP 417 "Aversana" exits and the Strada statale 18 Tirrena Inferiore. Taxis are available with a fixed fee towards Salerno, there are also 150 free parking spaces in front of the terminal.

=== Public transport ===
A special express coach (Salerno Airlink) as well as Line 8 of the local bus company CSTP connect the airport with Salerno. The nearest train stations are Salerno and Pontecagnano Faiano. An extension of the Salerno metropolitan railway service to the airport is also in planning stages.

== See also ==
- List of airports in Italy
