= Battipaglia =

- Comune
- Comune di Battipaglia
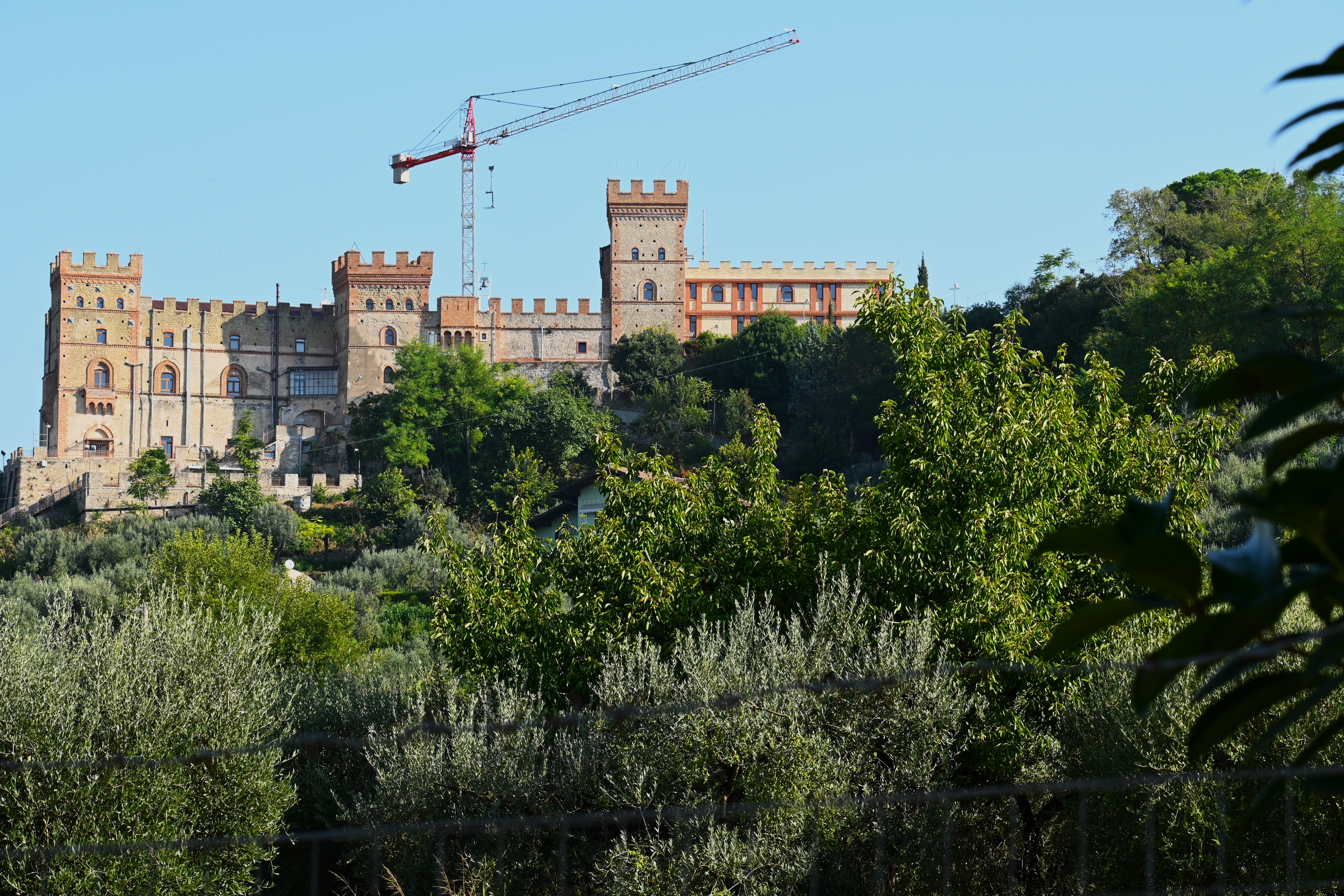
- The medieval castle of Battipaglia

- Coat of arms

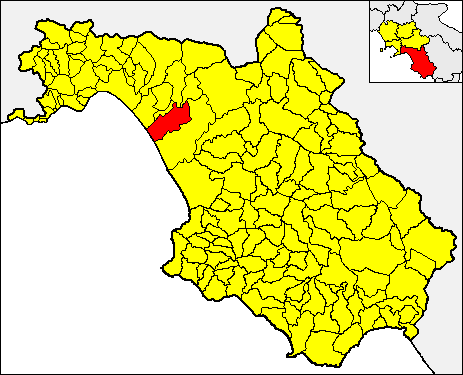
- Battipaglia within the Province of Salerno and Campania

- Location within Italy Location within Campania
- Coordinates: 40°37′N 14°59′E
- Country: Italy
- Region: Campania
- Province: Salerno (SA)
- Frazioni: Aversana, Belvedere, Fasanara, Lago, Padova, San Emilio, Santa Lucia Inferiore, Spineta, Tavernola, Verdesca, Vivai

Government
  - Mayor: Castrese De Rosa (prefectural commissioner)

Area
  - Total: 56.46 km^{2} (21.80 sq mi)
- Elevation: 72 m (236 ft)

Population (1 January 2026)
  - Total: 49,504
  - Density: 876.8/km^{2} (2,271/sq mi)
- Demonym: Battipagliesi
- Time zone: UTC+1 (CET)
  - Summer (DST): UTC+2 (CEST)
- Postal code: 84091
- Dialing code: 0828
- ISTAT code: 065014
- Patron saint: Santa Maria della Speranza
- Saint day: second Monday in July
- Website: Official website

Battipaglia (pronounced [ˌbattiˈpaʎʎa]) is a town and comune in the Province of Salerno, in the Campania region of southern Italy. With around 50,000 inhabitants, it is one of the most populous municipalities in the province after Salerno itself, and the main agricultural, industrial and railway hub of the Sele Plain.

The town is internationally renowned for the production of buffalo mozzarella. Beyond dairy farming, the surrounding plain is one of the most intensively cultivated areas of southern Italy, producing artichokes, tomatoes, tobacco and fruit, and is a leading centre for the cultivation of rocket and pre-washed bagged salads, much of it processed locally for the national and European retail market.

== History ==
Formerly part of the ancient Greek colonies of Magna Graecia, the area was home to Roman settlements during the late Republican and early Imperial periods. Archaeological excavations have brought to light finds dating back to the 3rd century BC pertaining to at least two villas. One stood near the coastline and formed part of a larger thermal complex, while the other lay further inland and likely served as a productive estate connecting the cereal fields of the plain to the olive groves and vineyards of the hills.

The town was first mentioned by its modern name in a 1080 document of the Duchy of Apulia and Calabria addressed to the local Catholic diocese. The name Battipaglia is popularly said to derive from the words batti (beat, in the sense of threshing) and paglia (straw), in reference to the activity of local peasants. Some scholars have nevertheless suggested that the name could have originated from Baptipalla, a place devoted to Voltumna, an Etruscan deity.

The township of Battipaglia was officially established by Ferdinand II of the Two Sicilies in 1858, when the Bourbon authorities designated the place as the site of an agricultural colony to house families who had survived the 1857 Basilicata earthquake. It was eventually granted the status of independent municipality by a Royal Decree on 28 March 1929 (during the Mussolini Cabinet), incorporating parts of the territories previously belonging to the nearby towns of Eboli and Montecorvino Rovella.

In 1943, during World War II, the town suffered heavy bombing by the Allied air forces, resulting in 117 civilian casualties. Although most of the town was razed to the ground, Battipaglia was rebuilt quickly in the aftermath of the conflict and attracted migrants from the inland villages of the province in search of work. The population grew rapidly between 1951 and 1960, and the town developed into a dynamic industrial centre. In 1953, Battipaglia made national headlines when its socialist mayor, Lorenzo Rago, was kidnapped and never found.

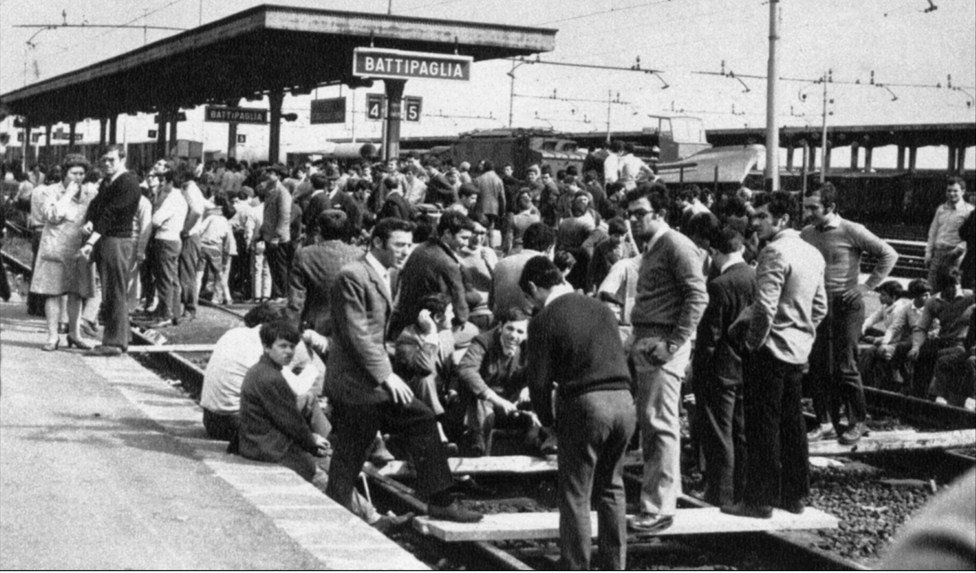
Rail blockade during the 1969 demonstrations

After the announced shutdown of two large sugar and tobacco processing factories in 1969, both employing a significant number of locals, thousands of Battipagliesi staged widespread riots, which subsided a few days later following the Italian government's commitment to keep both plants operational. The few but intense days of social unrest, which took place against the wider backdrop of the student and workers' protest movements then sweeping Italy and other Western countries, eventually resulted in two fatalities.

Since the late 20th and early 21st century, the agricultural sector has been joined by industry, with several companies establishing factories in the city.

== Geography ==
The municipality borders Bellizzi, Eboli, Montecorvino Rovella, Olevano sul Tusciano and Pontecagnano Faiano. Its hamlets (frazioni) are Aversana, Belvedere, Fasanara, Lago, Padova, San Emilio, Santa Lucia Inferiore, Spineta, Tavernola, Verdesca and Vivai.

== Demographics ==
=== Population ===
The first migration wave, beginning in the nineteenth century, brought many people to Battipaglia from Melfi and neighbouring municipalities. During the 1960s, the local population grew sharply with the influx of immigrants from bordering areas, including the towns of the Monti Picentini, Campagna, the valley of the Sele and Cilento, mainly drawn by the job opportunities offered by the town's industry. Over the last three decades, these communities have been joined by newer waves of immigrants, mainly from eastern Europe, northern Africa and southern Asia.

== Economy ==
The town's economy rests on the industrial, craft and agricultural sectors. The Battipaglia area is the leading region in Europe for the production of packaged salads and arugula.

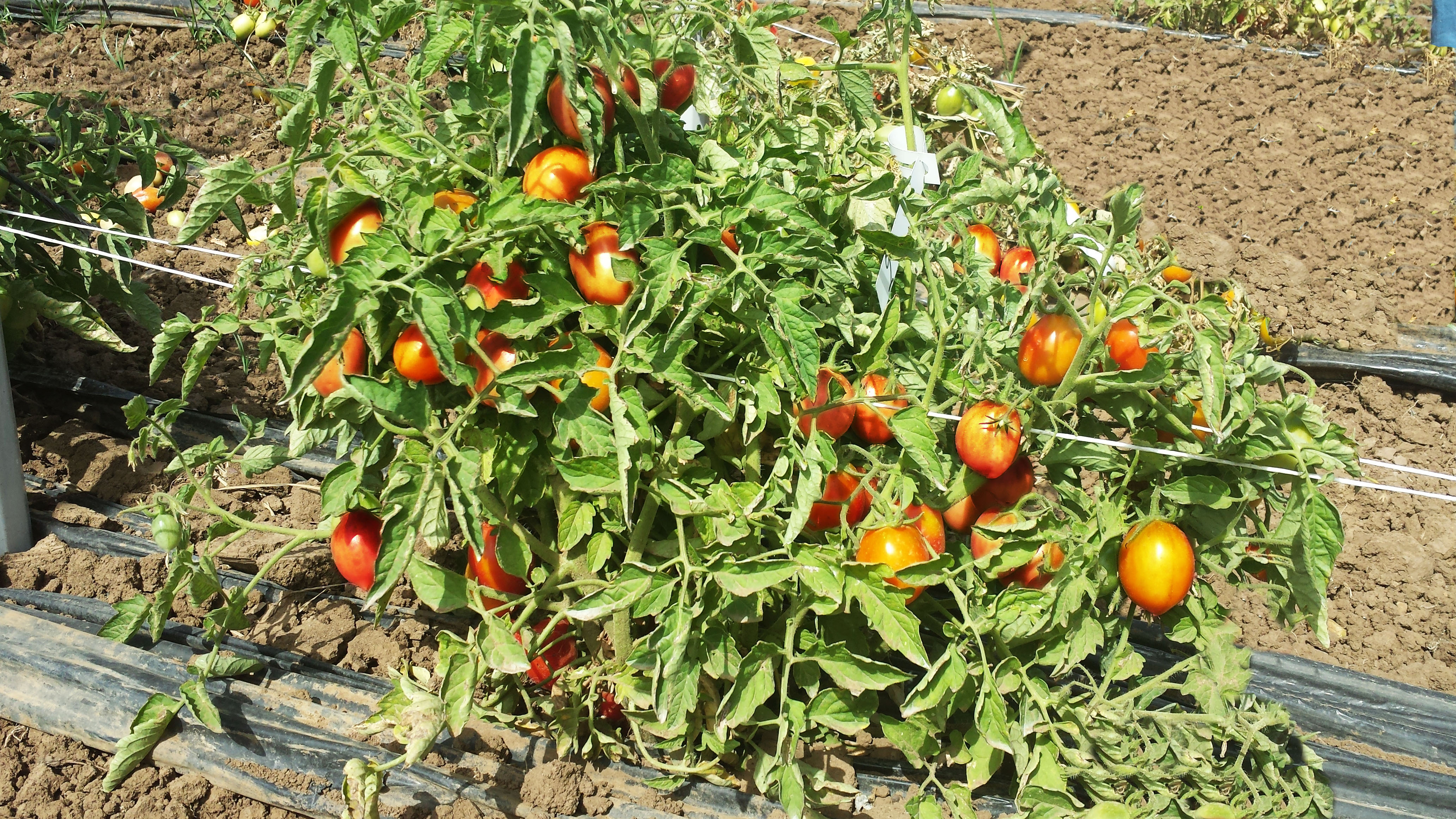
A plant of Fiaschello Battipagliese

A large number of local dairy companies produce the well-known buffalo mozzarella (Mozzarella di bufala campana DOP), of which a distinctive local variant is known as zizzona di Battipaglia (literally "Battipaglia's big breast") on account of its shape.

Battipaglia is also a production area for the Carciofo di Paestum (Paestum artichoke) IGP, the annurca apple IGP and the local Fiaschello tomato.

Among the most significant companies which have established factories in Battipaglia are Bonduelle (packaged vegetables), Sivam (animal feed), Cooper Standard Automotive (automotive components), Nexans (electric cables) and Deriblok (packaging).

== Culture ==
Every first Sunday of July the town centre is festively decorated for three days on the occasion of the feast of Our Lady of Hope (Festa della Speranza). The large town fair, which runs from Saturday to Monday and has the atmosphere of a funfair, with traders displaying their wares along the central streets, usually concludes with a live music performance in Piazza Amendola.

=== Education ===
Battipaglia houses a number of secondary schools, both public and private:

- Liceo scientifico, classico and linguistico "Enrico Medi"
- Istituto di Istruzione Superiore "Besta-Gloriosi" (istituto tecnico)
- Istituto di Istruzione Superiore "Enzo Ferrari" (istituto professionale)
- Istituto professionale per l'agricoltura Salerno
- Liceo scientifico e tecnico "Giacomo Leopardi" (private school)
- Istituto "Merini" (private school)
- Istituto "Robert Kennedy" (private school)

=== Media ===
==== Press ====
- Nero su Bianco (bi-weekly)
- Battipaglia 1929 (online news outlet)
- Battipaglia News (online news outlet)

==== Television and radio ====
- RCS75 – Radio Castelluccio (radio)
- SeiTV (television channel)
- Sud TV (television channel)

== Literature ==
- L. Rocco Carbone, Battipaglia, 70 anni nella sua storia, Massa Editore (1999).

== See also ==
- A.S.D. Battipagliese
