= Olevano sul Tusciano =

- Comune
- Comune di Olevano sul Tusciano
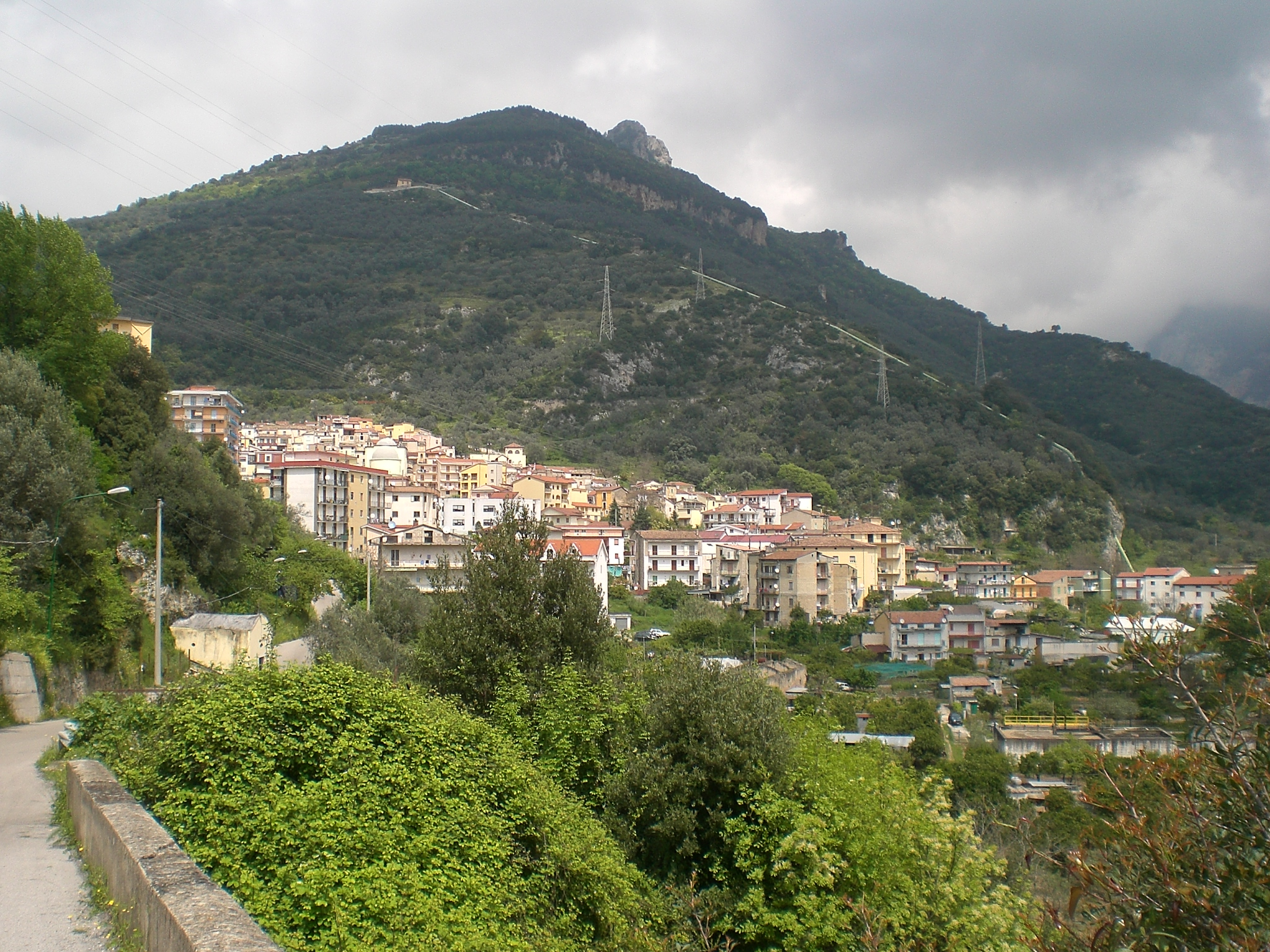
- View of Ariano, the municipal seat.

- Coat of arms

- Location within Italy Location within Campania
- Coordinates: 40°39′N 15°1′E
- Country: Italy
- Region: Campania
- Province: Salerno (SA)
- Frazioni: Ariano (municipal seat), Monticelli, Salitto

Government
  - Mayor: Michele Ciliberti

Area
  - Total: 26.72 km^{2} (10.32 sq mi)
- Elevation: 197 m (646 ft)

Population (31-8-2022)
  - Total: 6,535
  - Density: 244.6/km^{2} (633.4/sq mi)
- Demonym: Olevanesi
- Time zone: UTC+1 (CET)
  - Summer (DST): UTC+2 (CEST)
- Postal code: 84062
- Dialing code: 0828
- Patron saint: St. Michael Archangel
- Saint day: 8 May
- Website: Official website

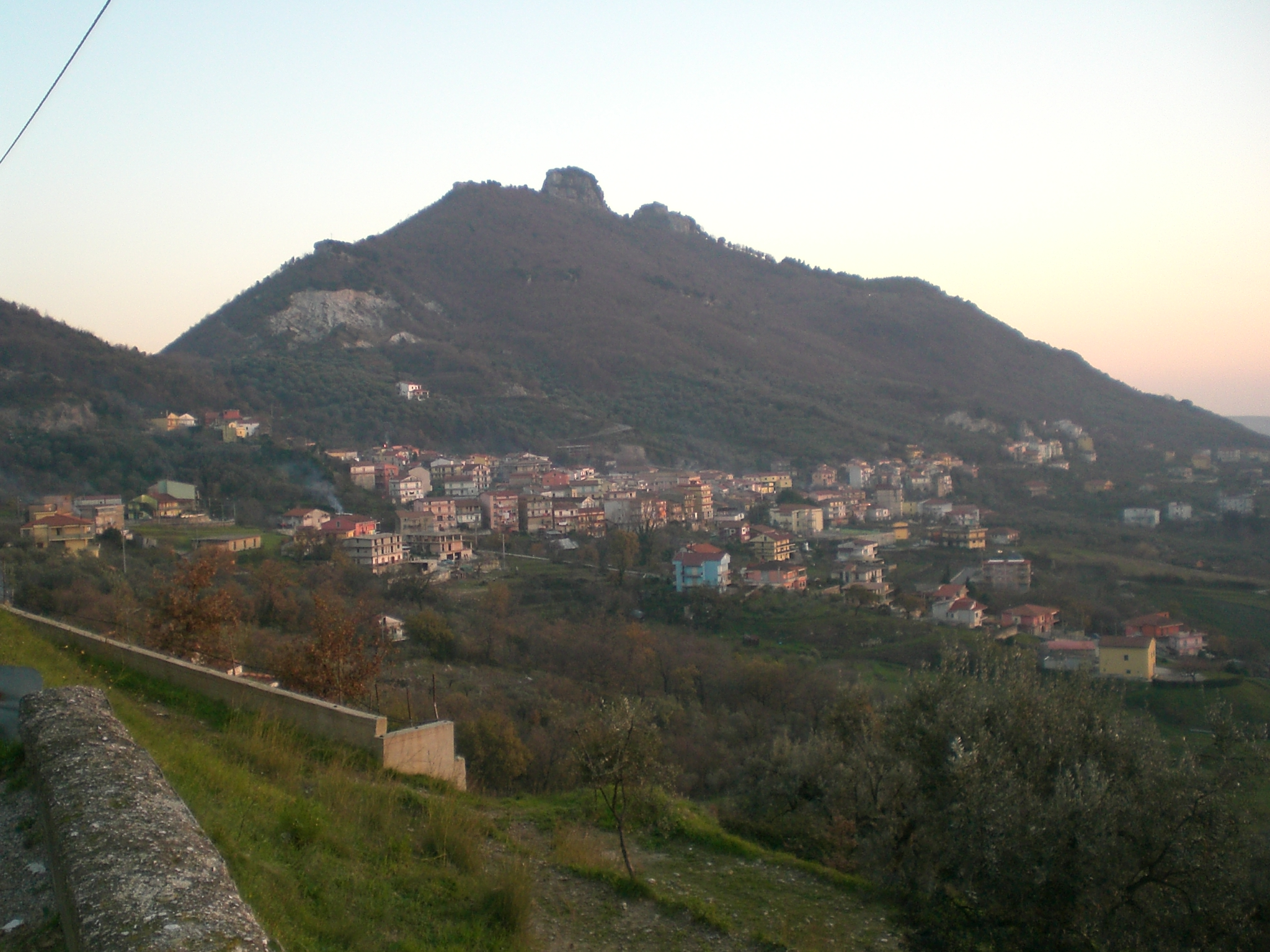
View of the frazione of Salitto.

Olevano sul Tusciano is a town and comune in the province of Salerno in the Campania region of south-western Italy.

== Main sights ==
- Roman villa of S. Maria a Corte
- Castrum Olibani, a Lombard castle. During the rule of Frederick of Hohenstaufen in southern Italy, it was a seat of Hermann von Salza
- Pope gardens in Salitto
- St. Vincenzo prison
- Convent of Santa Maria di Costantinopoli, a 16th-century Dominican building
- Curtis di Santa Maria a Corte
- Church of S. Maria a Corte (1600)
- Church of San Leone Magno (1700)
- Church of Santa Lucia (1700)
- Coven of Santa Regina in Monticello village (1470)
- Chapel of Santa Maria delle Grazie in Monticelli (1746)
- Coven of San Giacomo in Ariano (1400)
- Chapel of San Rocco (remains) near Tusciano river.
- Chapel of Madonna della Neve (1500).
- Coven of Santa Maria del Soccorso in Salitto (1515).
- Chapel of Maria Santissima del Rosario in Salitto (968).
- Chapel of Madonna delle Grazie in Salitto (1500).
- Grotta di Nardantuono: part of St. Michael's cave. Legend has it that the cave served as the hideout for the band of brigands led by Antonio di Nardo, a notorious 19th-century robber known as Nardantuono.

== Twin towns ==
- Wilmington, United States
