= Parco Nazionale del Cilento, Vallo di Diano e Alburni =

National park in Italy

Cilento, Vallo di Diano and Alburni National Park
- Parco Nazionale del Cilento, Vallo di Diano e Alburni
- IUCN category II (national park)
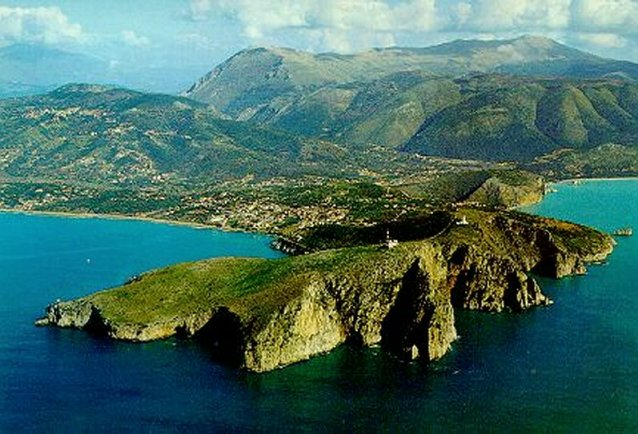
- Cape Palinuro

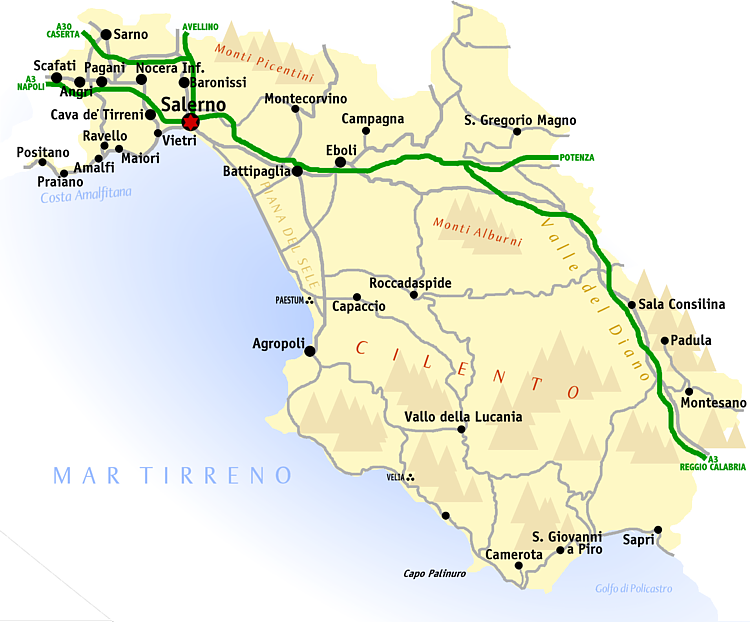
- Salerno region
- Location: Campania
- Nearest city: Salerno
- Coordinates: 40°17′N 15°28′E
- Area: 1,810.48 km^{2} (699.03 sq mi)
- Established: 1991
- Governing body: Ministero dell'Ambiente
- Website: parks.it

UNESCO World Heritage Site
- Official name: Cilento and Vallo di Diano National Park with the Archeological Sites of Paestum and Velia, and the Certosa di Padula
- Type: Cultural
- Criteria: iii, iv
- Designated: 1998 (22nd session)
- Reference no.: 842
- Region: Europe and North America

Cilento, Vallo di Diano and Alburni National Park (Italian Parco Nazionale del Cilento, Vallo di Diano e Alburni) is an Italian national park in the Province of Salerno, in Campania in southern Italy. It includes much of the Cilento, the Vallo di Diano and the Monti Alburni. It was founded in 1991 and was formerly known as the Parco Nazionale del Cilento e Vallo di Diano.

== History ==
The park was officially instituted on December 6, 1991, to protect the territory of Cilento from building speculation and mass tourism. Originally named Parco Nazionale del Cilento e Vallo di Diano, in 1998 it became a World Heritage Site of UNESCO, also with the ancient Greek towns of Paestum, Velia and the Padula Charterhouse.

The other natural reserves instituted in the area of the park are the "Natural reserve of Foce Sele-Tanagro" (created in 1993, with the Oasis of Persano) and the "Maritime reserve of Punta Licosa", in the municipality of Castellabate.

== Geography ==
The national park's territory, one of the largest in Italy, does not include all the municipalities of the areas of Cilento and Vallo di Diano. It includes almost all the Cilentan Coast and its central forest area is Pruno. The administrative offices are located in Vallo della Lucania, at Piazza Santa Caterina nr. 8.

The park also includes important karst systems along the Cilentan coast, such as the Caves of Marina di Camerota.

The municipalities part of the park are:

- Agropoli
- Aquara
- Ascea
- Auletta
- Bellosguardo
- Buonabitacolo
- Camerota
- Campora
- Cannalonga
- Capaccio-Paestum
- Casalbuono
- Casal Velino
- Casaletto Spartano
- Caselle in Pittari
- Castel San Lorenzo
- Castelcivita
- Castellabate
- Castelnuovo Cilento
- Celle di Bulgheria
- Centola
- Ceraso
- Cicerale
- Controne
- Corleto Monforte
- Cuccaro Vetere
- Felitto
- Futani
- Gioi
- Giungano
- Laureana Cilento
- Laurino
- Laurito
- Lustra
- Magliano Vetere
- Moio della Civitella
- Montano Antilia
- Montecorice
- Monteforte Cilento
- Monte San Giacomo
- Montesano sulla Marcellana
- Morigerati
- Novi Velia
- Ogliastro Cilento
- Omignano
- Orria
- Ottati
- Perdifumo
- Perito
- Petina
- Piaggine
- Pisciotta
- Polla
- Pollica
- Postiglione
- Prignano Cilento
- Roccadaspide
- Roccagloriosa
- Rofrano
- Roscigno
- Sacco
- Salento
- San Giovanni a Piro
- San Mauro Cilento
- San Mauro la Bruca
- San Pietro al Tanagro
- San Rufo
- Santa Marina
- Sant'Angelo a Fasanella
- Sant'Arsenio
- Sanza
- Sassano
- Serramezzana
- Sessa Cilento
- Sicignano degli Alburni
- Stella Cilento
- Stio
- Teggiano
- Torre Orsaia
- Torchiara
- Tortorella
- Trentinara
- Valle dell'Angelo
- Vallo della Lucania

== Gallery ==
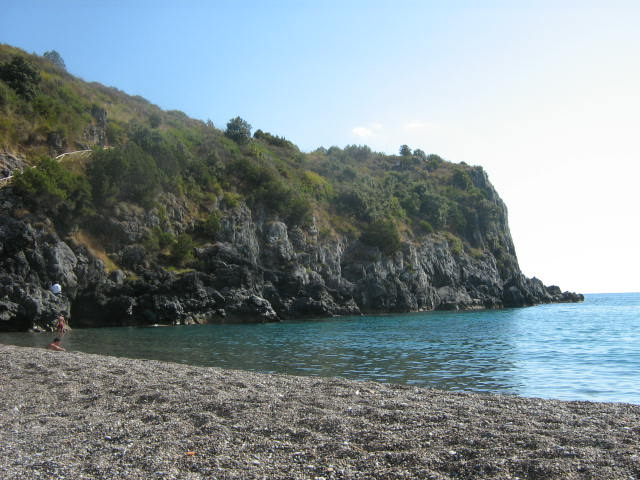
Lentiscella beach in Marina di Camerota

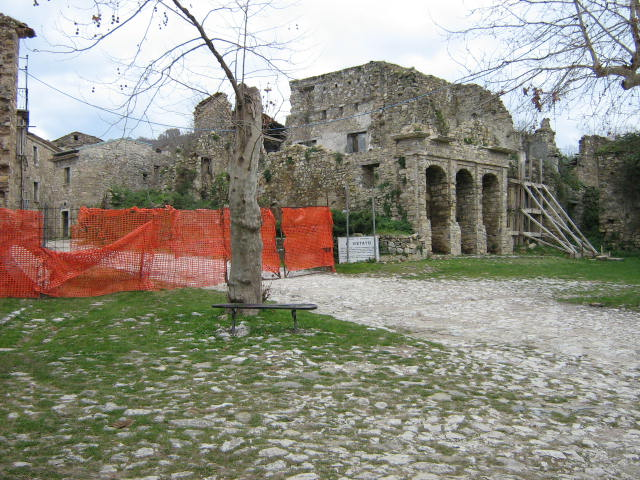
Roscigno

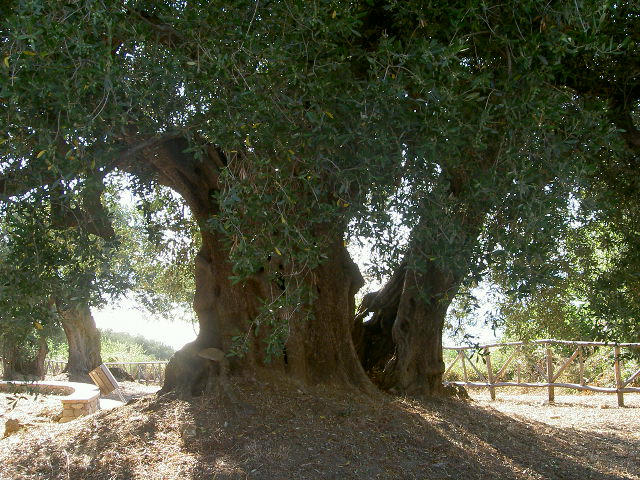
An ancient olive tree

== See also ==
- Cilentan Coast
- Castelcivita Caves
- Pertosa Caves
- Foce del Sele
- List of National Parks of Italy
- Caves of Marina di Camerota
