= Tanagro =

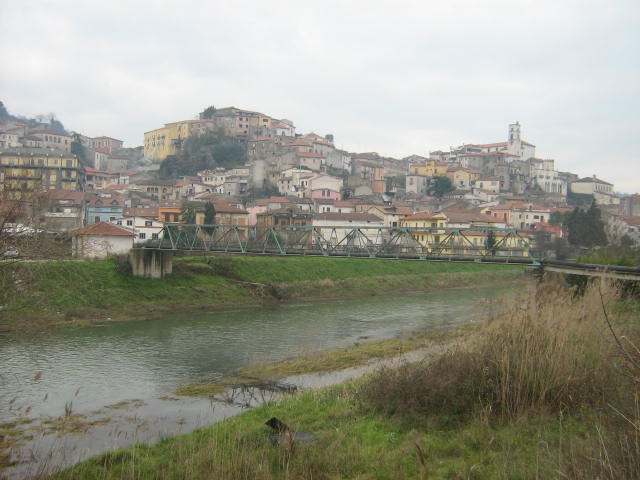
- The Tanagro crossing Polla

Location
- Country: Italy

Physical characteristics
- Source
  - location: Hillside near Casalbuono
- Mouth: Sele
  - location: near Contursi Terme
  - coordinates: 40.6335°N 15.2301°E
- Length: 92 km (57 mi)
- Basin size: 1,835 km^{2} (708 sq mi)
- Discharge
  - average: 20 m^{3}/s (710 cu ft/s)

Basin features
- Progression: Sele→ Tyrrhenian Sea

The Tanagro (Tanàgro) or Negro is a river of the Province of Salerno, southwestern Italy. It rises in the Vallo di Diano and is a tributary of the Sele River. In ancient times it was known as Tanager.

== Overview ==
From the origin to the mouth, the river flows in the municipal territories of Casalbuono, Montesano sulla Marcellana, Buonabitacolo, Sassano, Padula, Sala Consilina, Teggiano, San Rufo, Atena Lucana, Sant'Arsenio, San Pietro al Tanagro, Polla, Pertosa, Auletta, Petina, Buccino, Sicignano degli Alburni and Contursi Terme. It crosses the towns and villages of Casalbuono, Ascolese (Padula), Silla (Sassano), Atena Lucana Scalo, Polla, Pertosa (near the caves), Auletta, Sicignano Scalo and Contursi Scalo.
