= Cilento =

Geographical region in Italy

UNESCO World Heritage Site
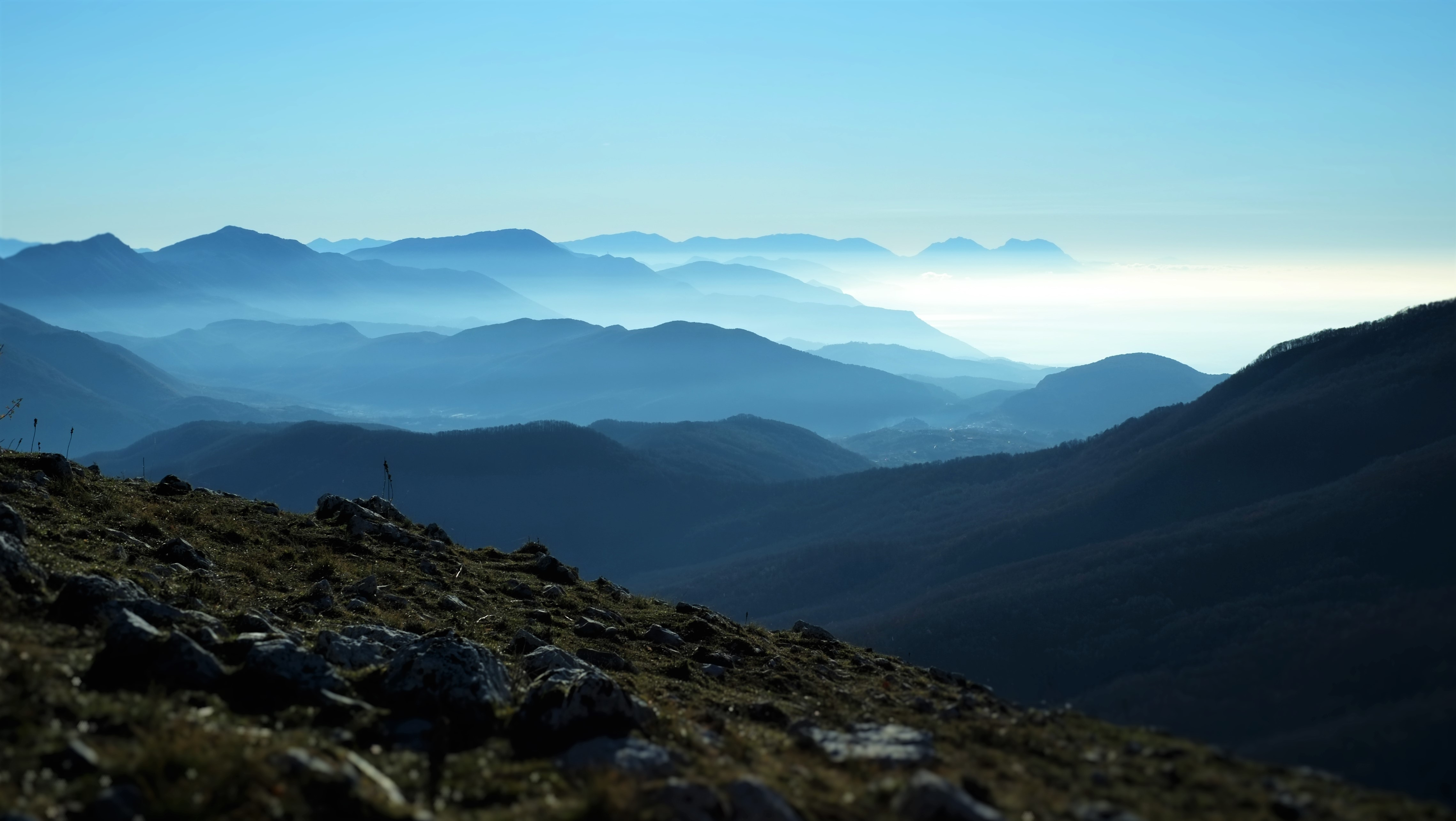
- View from Mount Cervati

- Location within Campania Location within Italy
- Location: Province of Salerno, Campania, Italy
- Part of: Cilento and Vallo di Diano National Park with the Archeological Sites of Paestum and Velia, and the Certosa di Padula
- Criteria: Cultural: (iii)(iv)
- Reference: 842
- Inscription: 1998 (22nd Session)
- Coordinates: 40°17′24″N 15°28′34″E

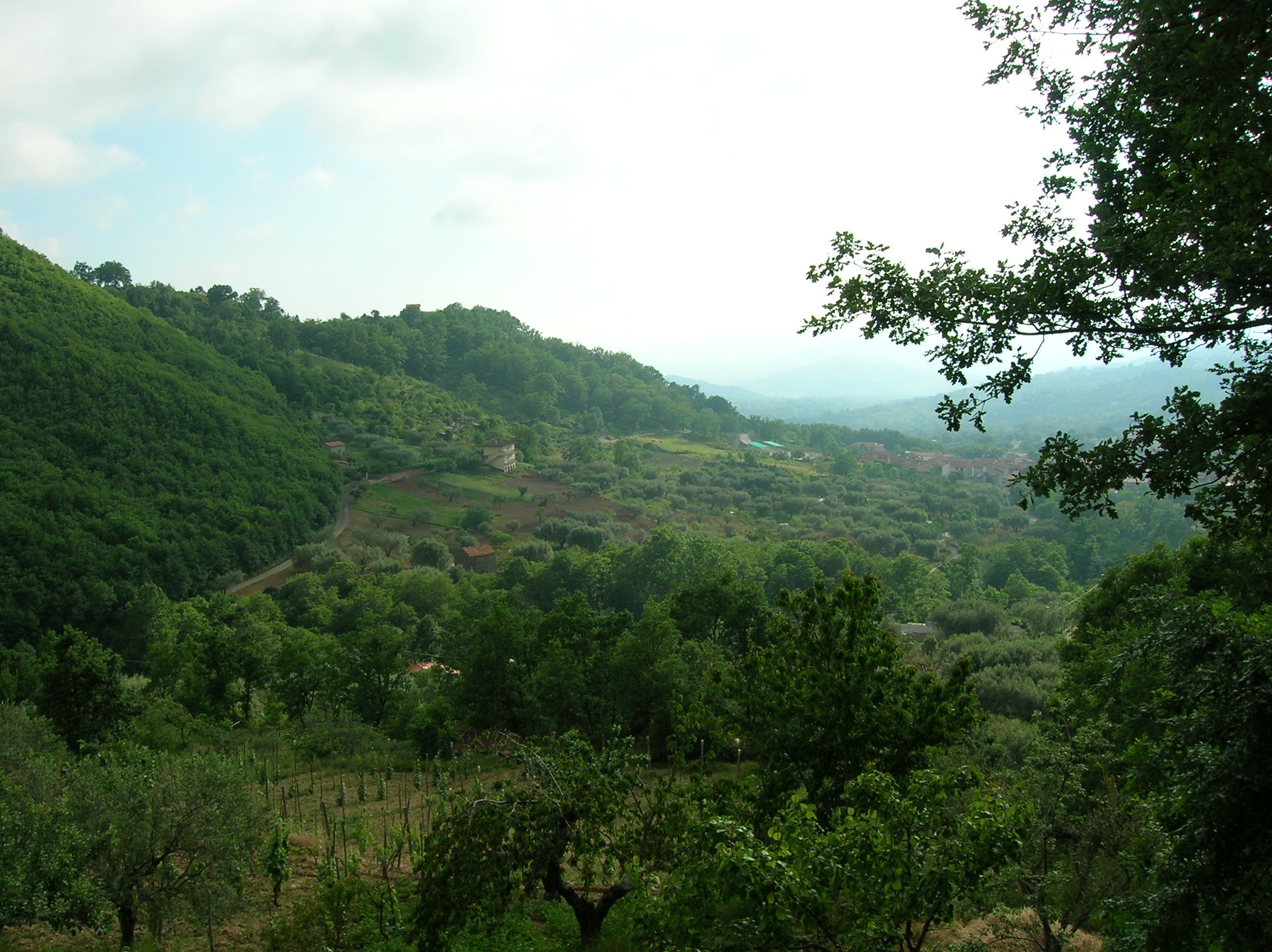
National Park nearby Cannalonga

Cilento (Italian: [tʃiˈlɛnto]) is an Italian mountain range (part of the Lucan Apennines), which gives its name to a geographical region of Campania in the central and southern part of the province of Salerno. It is an important tourist area of southern Italy.

== Geography ==
The Cilento mountain range, part of the Lucan Apennines, is located south to Sele plain, north to Basilicata, west to Alburni mountain range and Vallo di Diano. The main mountains are the Mount Stella (1131 m) in the North, Mounts Gelbison (1705 m) and Cervati (1899 m) in the center, Mount Bulgheria (1225 m) in the south. This area is sparsely inhabited, most villages are located at high altitudes, and the territory is mostly covered by forests. The mountain range is divided in two areas by the river mouth of Alento and the Mounts Gelbison and Cervati: "High" Cilento (Alto Cilento) and "Low" Cilento (Basso Cilento), respectively at the North and the South of the listed sites.

The coast of Cilento is located on the Tyrrhenian Sea, stretching from Paestum to the Gulf of Policastro, near the town of Sapri. Most of the touristic destinations in the coast are frazioni (hamlets) of comuni (municipalities) whose seats are inland; examples include Santa Maria di Castellabate, Acciaroli, Velia, Palinuro, Marina di Camerota, Scario and Policastro Bussentino.

The inner boundaries of the Cilento mountain range are the Alburni mountains and Vallo di Diano; in addition to the Cilento mountain range, they are also considered as part of Cilento geographical region, such as the southern part of the Sele plain and the mountain range of Eremita-Marzano. The entire Cilento geographical region is located south to Sele river, an area known as the western part of Lucania, which has in Sala Consilina (in the Vallo di Diano) its largest center. The other most important towns in this area are Vallo della Lucania (in the middle of Cilento mountain range), Sapri and Agropoli in the Cilento coust; Sapri is the largest town of Cilento, and the principal harbour. Most of this area is included in "Cilento and Vallo di Diano National Park". The principal site in the southern part of the Sele plain is the archeological site of Paestum, while the main center is Altavilla Silentina. In the Eremita-Marzano mountain range the principal city is Buccino, while in the Alburni mountain range there are Castelcivita and Sicignano degli Alburni.

== Communes ==
=== Alto Cilento communes ===
- Agropoli
- Aquara
- Ascea
- Bellosguardo
- Campora
- Cannalonga
- Capaccio Paestum
- Casal Velino
- Castellabate
- Castelnuovo Cilento
- Castel San Lorenzo
- Ceraso
- Cicerale
- Felitto
- Gioi
- Giungano
- Laureana Cilento
- Laurino
- Lustra
- Magliano Vetere
- Moio della Civitella
- Monteforte Cilento
- Novi Velia
- Ogliastro Cilento
- Omignano
- Orria
- Perdifumo
- Perito
- Piaggine
- Pollica
- Prignano Cilento
- Roccadaspide
- Roscigno
- Rutino
- Sacco
- Salento
- San Mauro Cilento
- Serramezzana
- Sessa Cilento
- Stella Cilento
- Stio
- Torchiara
- Trentinara
- Valle dell'Angelo
- Vallo della Lucania

=== Basso Cilento communes ===
- Alfano
- Camerota
- Casaletto Spartano
- Caselle in Pittari
- Celle di Bulgheria
- Centola
- Cuccaro Vetere
- Futani
- Ispani
- Laurito
- Montano Antilia
- Montecorice
- Morigerati
- Pisciotta
- Policastro Bussentino
- Roccagloriosa
- Rofrano
- San Mauro La Bruca
- San Giovanni a Piro
- Santa Marina
- Sanza
- Sapri
- Torraca
- Torre Orsaia
- Tortorella
- Vibonati

=== Mounts Alburni communes ===
- Castelcivita
- Controne
- Corleto Monforte
- Ottati
- Petina
- Postiglione
- Sant'Angelo a Fasanella
- Sicignano degli Alburni

=== Vallo di Diano communes ===
- Atena Lucana
- Auletta
- Buonabitacolo
- Caggiano
- Casalbuono
- Monte San Giacomo
- Montesano sulla Marcellana
- Padula
- Pertosa
- Polla
- Sala Consilina
- San Pietro al Tanagro
- San Rufo
- Sant'Arsenio
- Sassano
- Teggiano

=== Southern part of Sele plain communes ===
- Altavilla Silentina
- Albanella
- Serre

=== Mounts Eremita-Marzano communes ===
- Buccino
- Palomonte
- Ricigliano
- Romagnano al Monte
- San Gregorio Magno
- Salvitelle

== History ==
=== Ancient History ===
As part of the ancient region of Lucania, the Cilento was inhabited by Lucanians people, an italic tribe. Known lucanian site are Roscigno, Roccagloriosa and Caselle in Pittari, where archaeological excavations have been made.

The region is steeped in Greek mythology and legends, as in the names of some towns, which is also visible in the remains of the colonies of Velia (ancient Elea) and Paestum (ancient Poseidonia). Velia was also the seat of "Eleatics", a school of pre-Socratic philosophers as Parmenides, Zeno of Elea and Melissus of Samos). The Romans made new cities mainly in the Vallo di Diano and Mounts Eremita-Marzano, as Volcei, because of the central position in relation to the main road of the empire in this area (the Capua-Regio).

=== Middle Ages ===
After the Lombard conquest, the Cilento area was included in the Principality of Salerno, as a "gastaldato" (a type of district of the time) of Lucania, divided into the counties of Capaccio and Magliano. The Normans created the baronies of Rocca Cilento and Novi Velia, which became the main centers of the region. The Cilento territory was located on the border with the Byzantine area, which is why many Greek rite monasteries were created. The nobles of the territory frequently rebelled against the sovereigns, as with Frederick II of Swabia and Ferrante of Aragon, carrying out many conspiracies. The Angevins and Aragonese fought in the territory during the War of the Vespers, becoming a battlefield for a long time. At the end of the Middle Ages there were continuous battles with the Ottoman pirates. All these events led to the construction of the numerous castles that characterize the area.

Cilento comes by the Latin word Cis Alentum, meaning "On this side of the Alento", a name given by the Lombards.

=== Sixth province of Campania ===
In the 1990s it was proposed to make Cilento a new province of Campania. This proposal has never come near to implementation; in particular there was the difficulty of choosing an administrative centre. The four candidates were Vallo della Lucania (in the most central position), Agropoli (the largest town, situated in the north), Sala Consilina (the most populous town of Vallo di Diano) and Sapri (in the centre of southern Cilento, with the most important railway station). Another more recent proposal was to move Cilento from Campania to Basilicata, as a third province together with the existing provinces of Potenza and Matera.

== National Park ==
In 1991, Cilento and Vallo di Diano National Park was instituted to preserve the landscape and promote tourism. In 1998, the park became a World Heritage Site of UNESCO.

== Coast ==
The Cilentan Coast, or Costiera Cilentana in Italian, is a stretch of coastline situated in the gulfs of Salerno and Policastro, extending in 16 municipalities; from Capaccio-Paestum in the north-west to Sapri in the south-east.

== Language ==
Cilento was part of ancient Lucania, and its language is influenced by Lucanian. In the north of Cilento, the dialect is more influenced by Neapolitan, but in the south, it has many similarities with Sicilian.

== Cilento DOC ==
Italian wine, red, white and rose, under the Cilento DOC appellation comes from this area. Grapes destined for DOC product must be harvested to a maximum yield of 12 tonnes/hectare with the finished red wines fermented to a minimum alcohol level of 11.5% and the whites and roses fermented to 11%.

Red Cilento wines are a blend of 60-70% Aglianico, 15-20% of Piedirosso and/or Primitivo, 10-20% Barbera and up to 10% of other local red grape varieties. The whites are a blend of 60-65% Fiano, 20-30% Trebbiano, 10-15% of Greco or Malvasia bianca with up to 10% of other local white varieties. The roses are blends of 70-80% Sangiovese, 10-15% of Piedirosso and/or Primitivo and up to 10% of other local red grape varieties. A separate varietal Aglianico can also be produced under the Cilento DOC provided that at least 85% of the wine is Aglianico with Primitivo and/or Piedirosso permitted to fill in the remainder and that the wine is aged at least one year before it is released.

== Photogallery ==
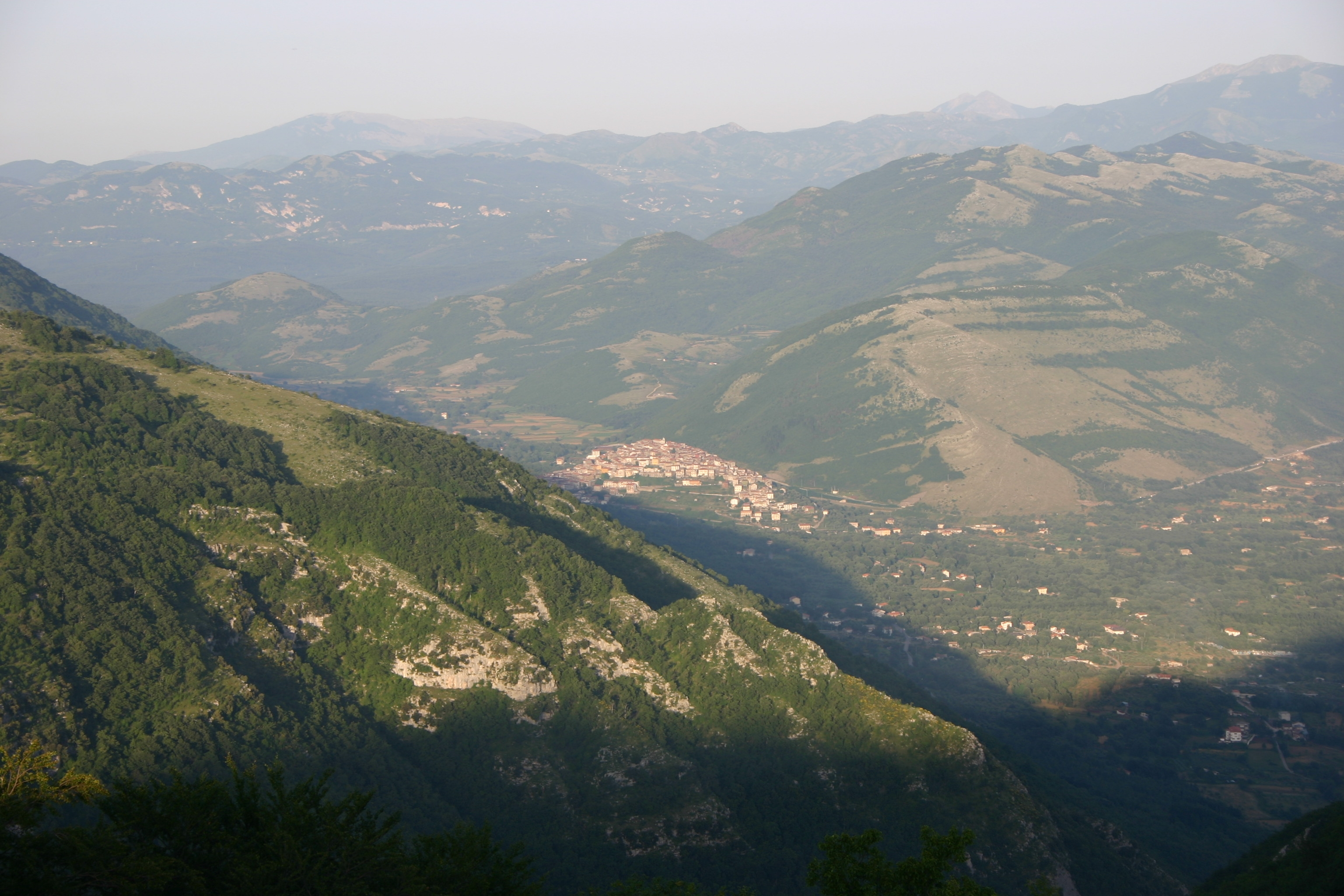
Sanza

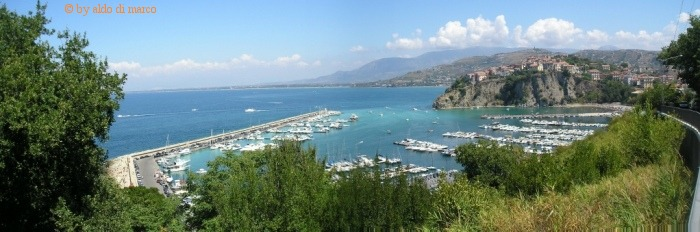
Agropoli

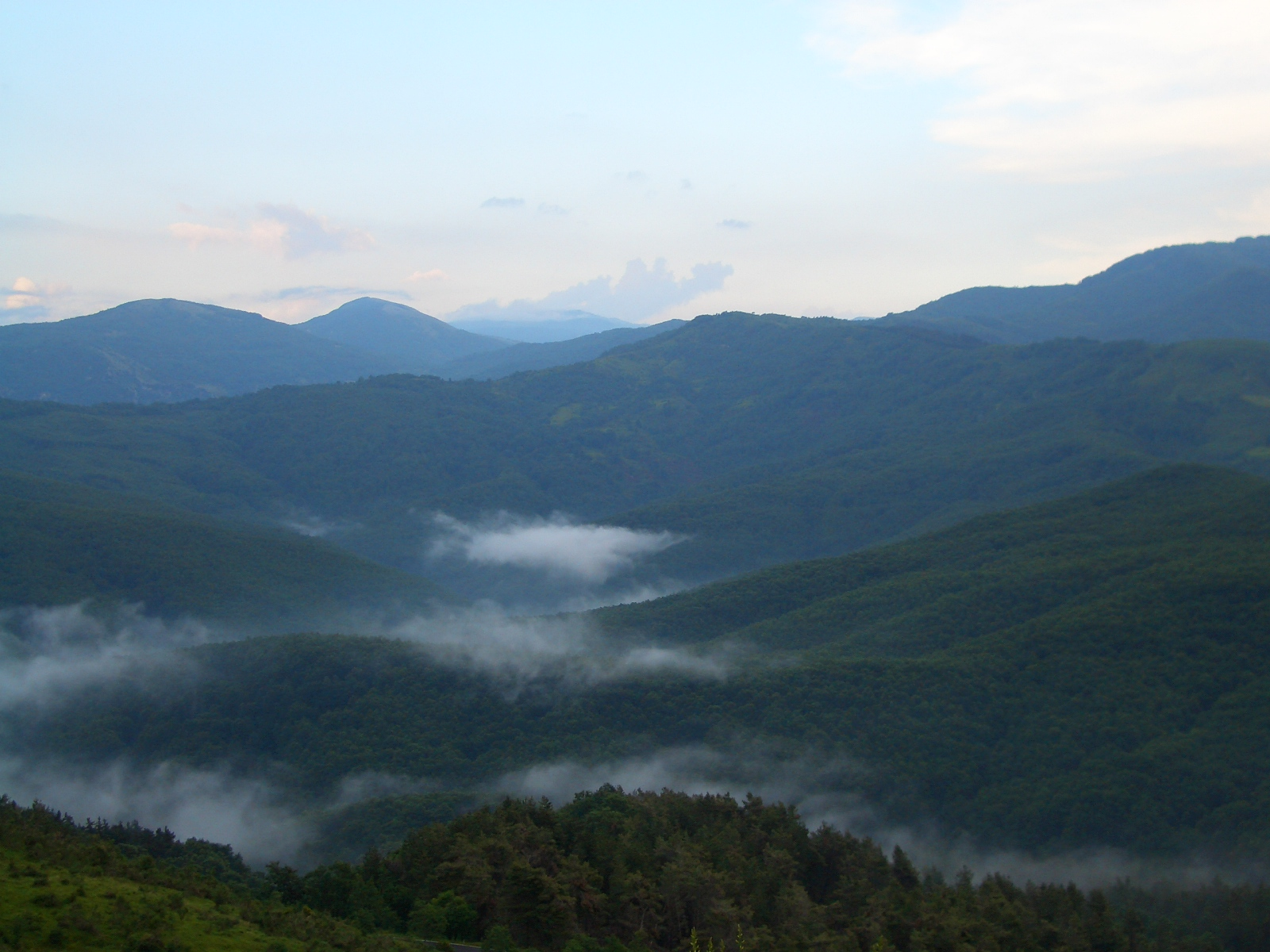
View from Campora

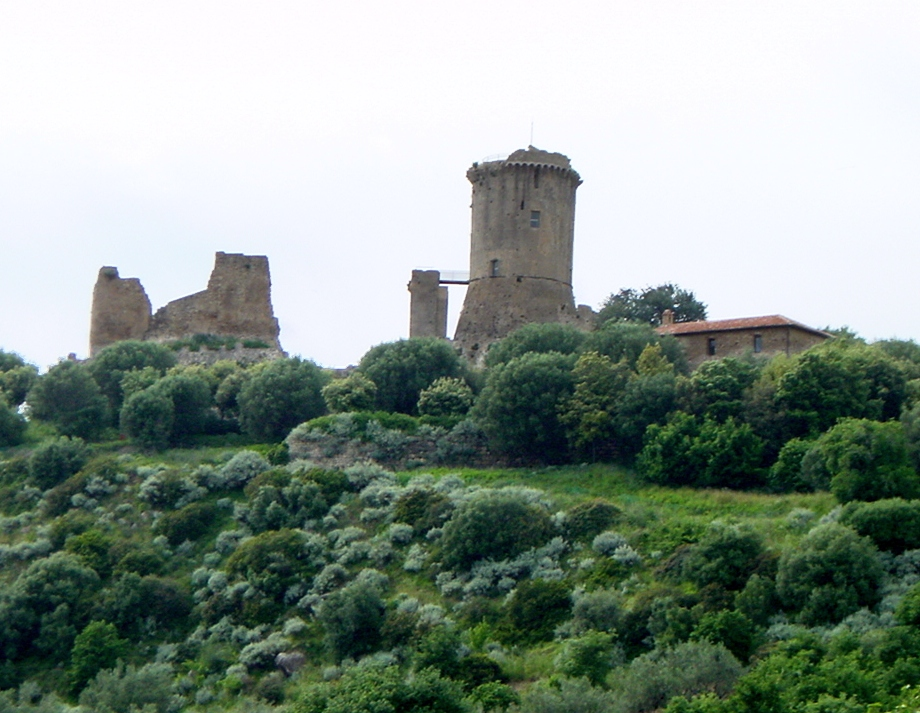
Velia ruins

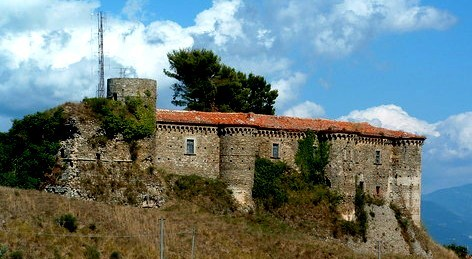
Castle of Rocca Cilento

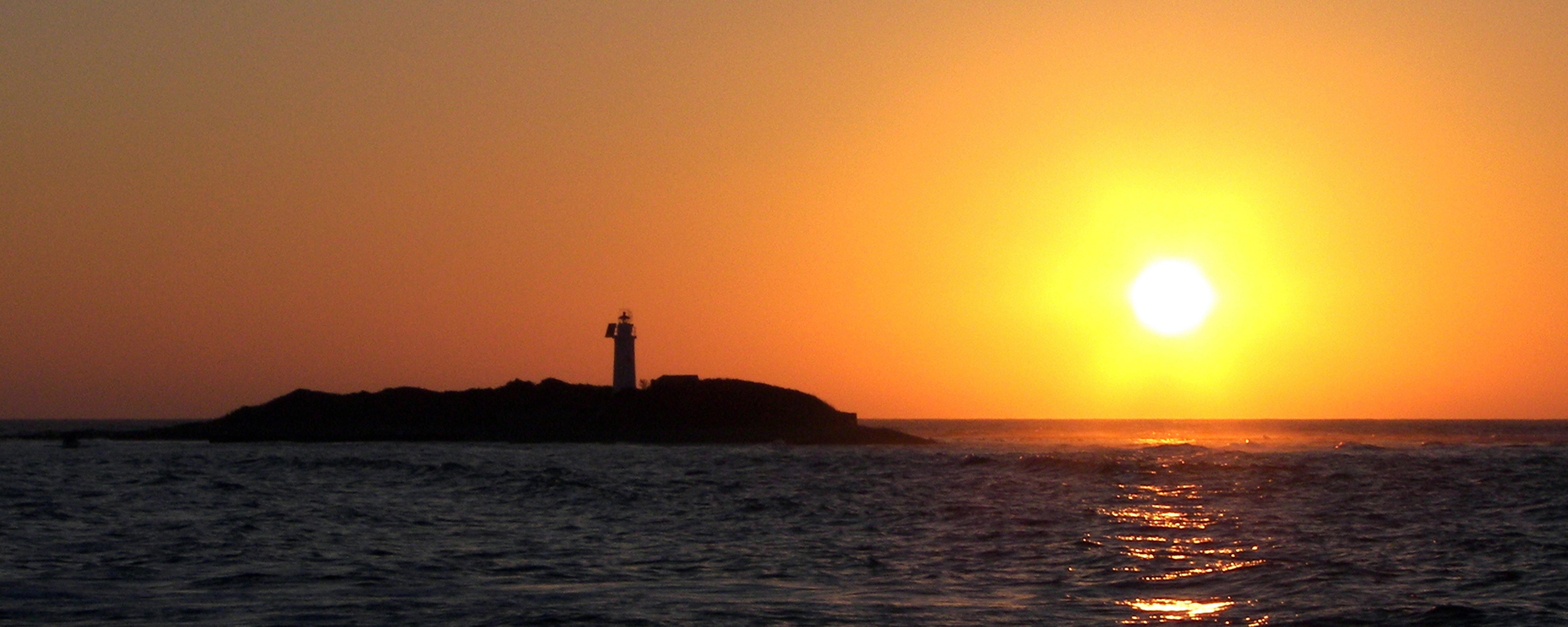
Licosa island in the Comune of Castellabate

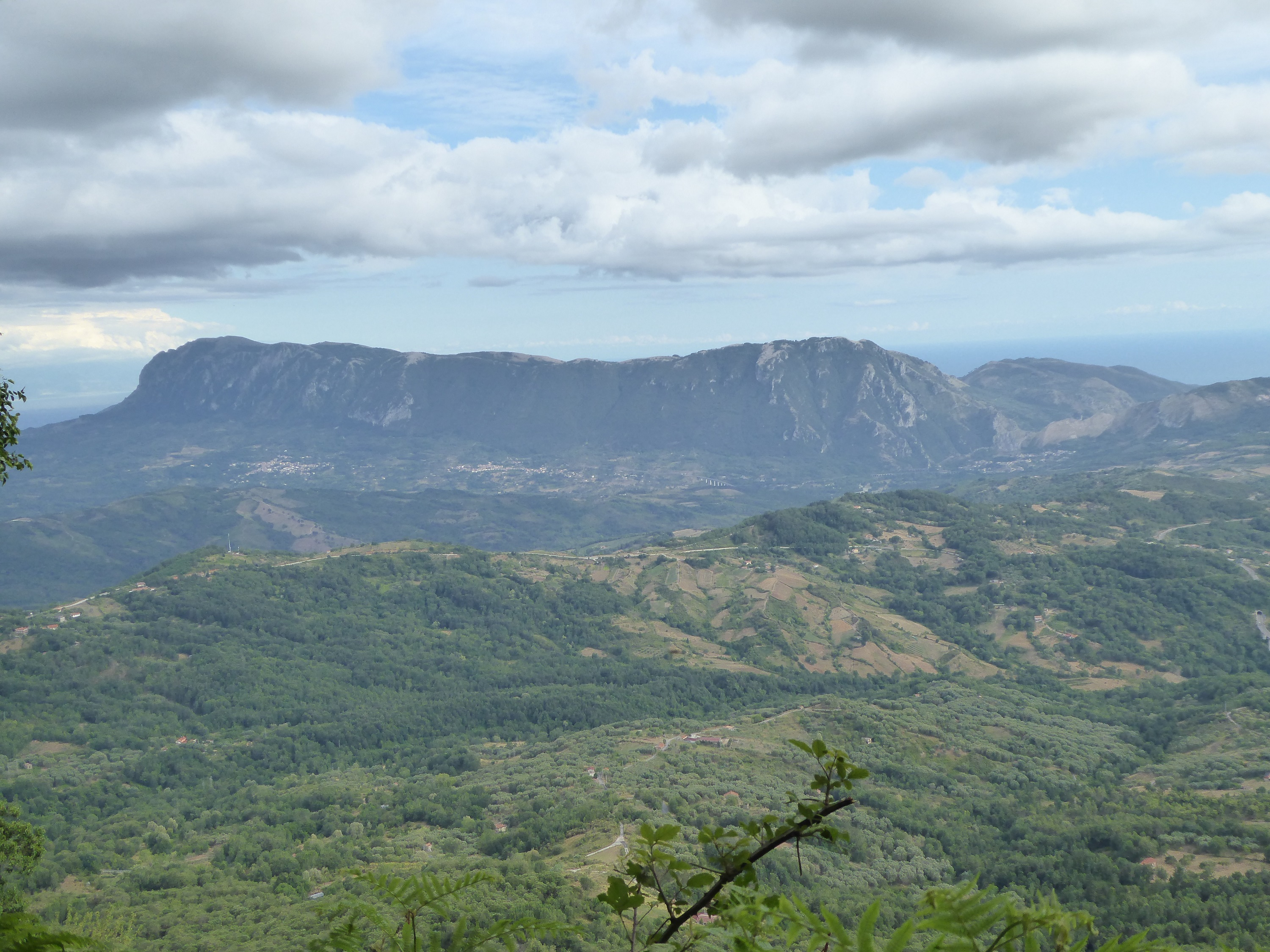
Mount Bulgheria

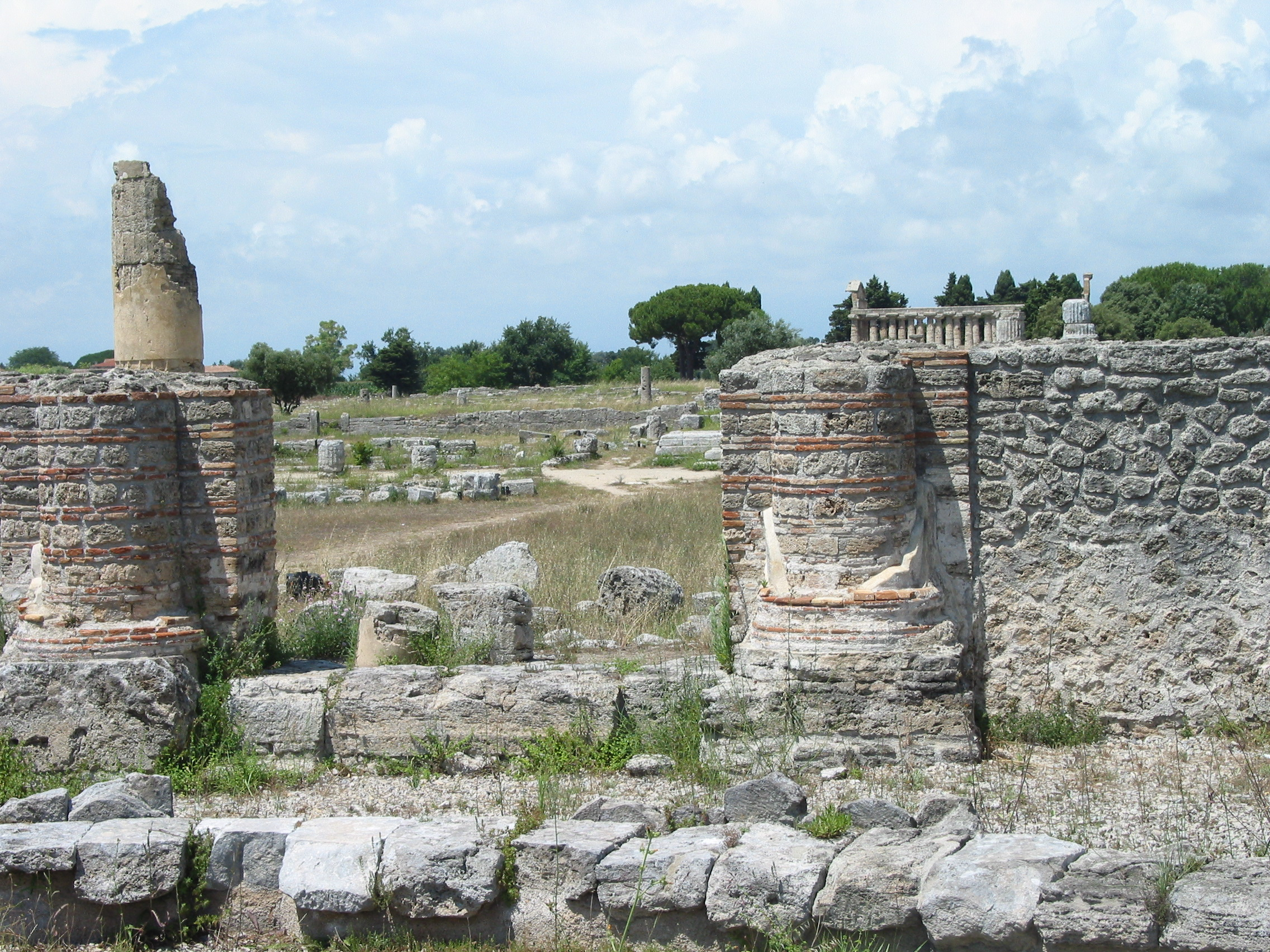
Paestum

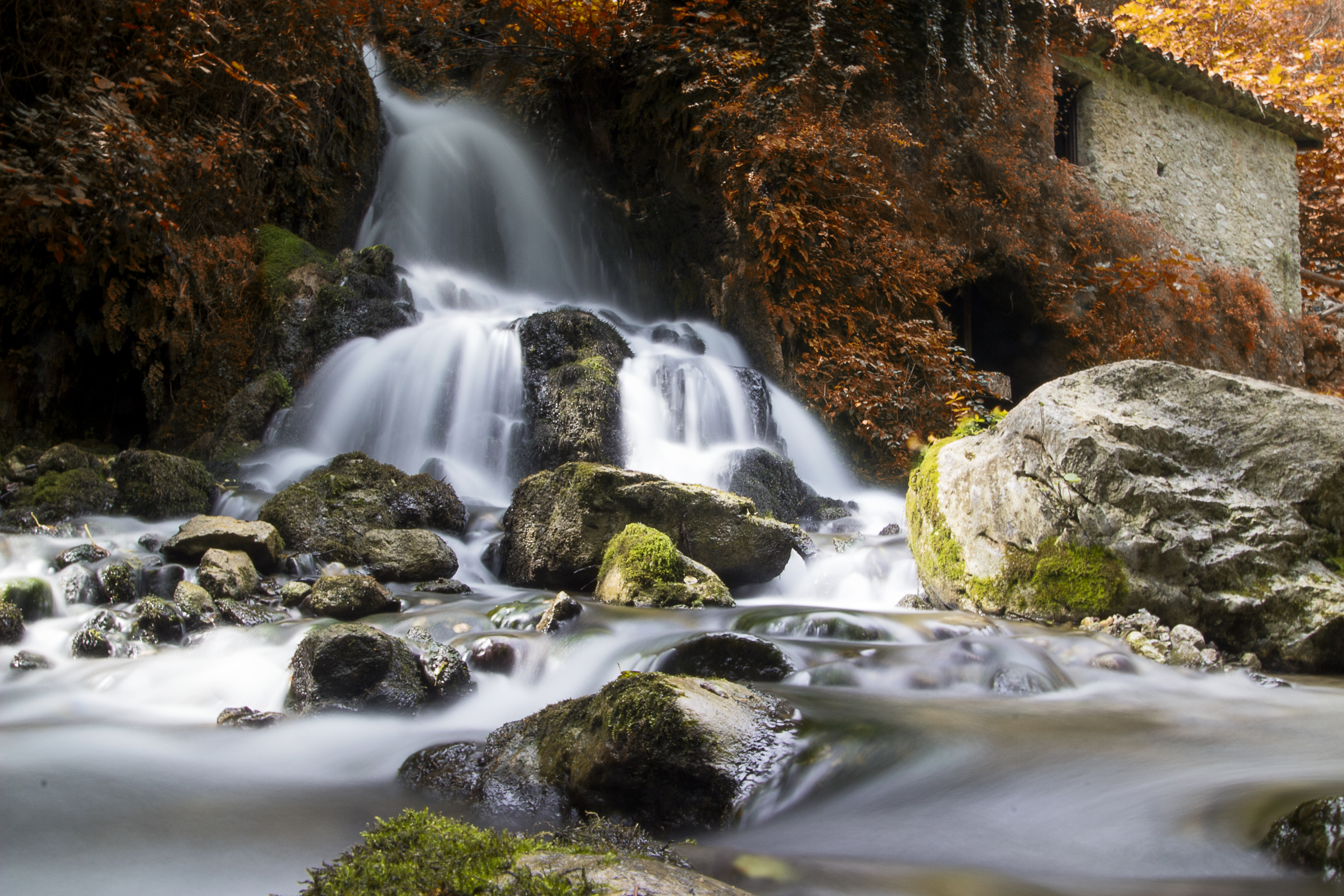
Bussento river at Morigerati

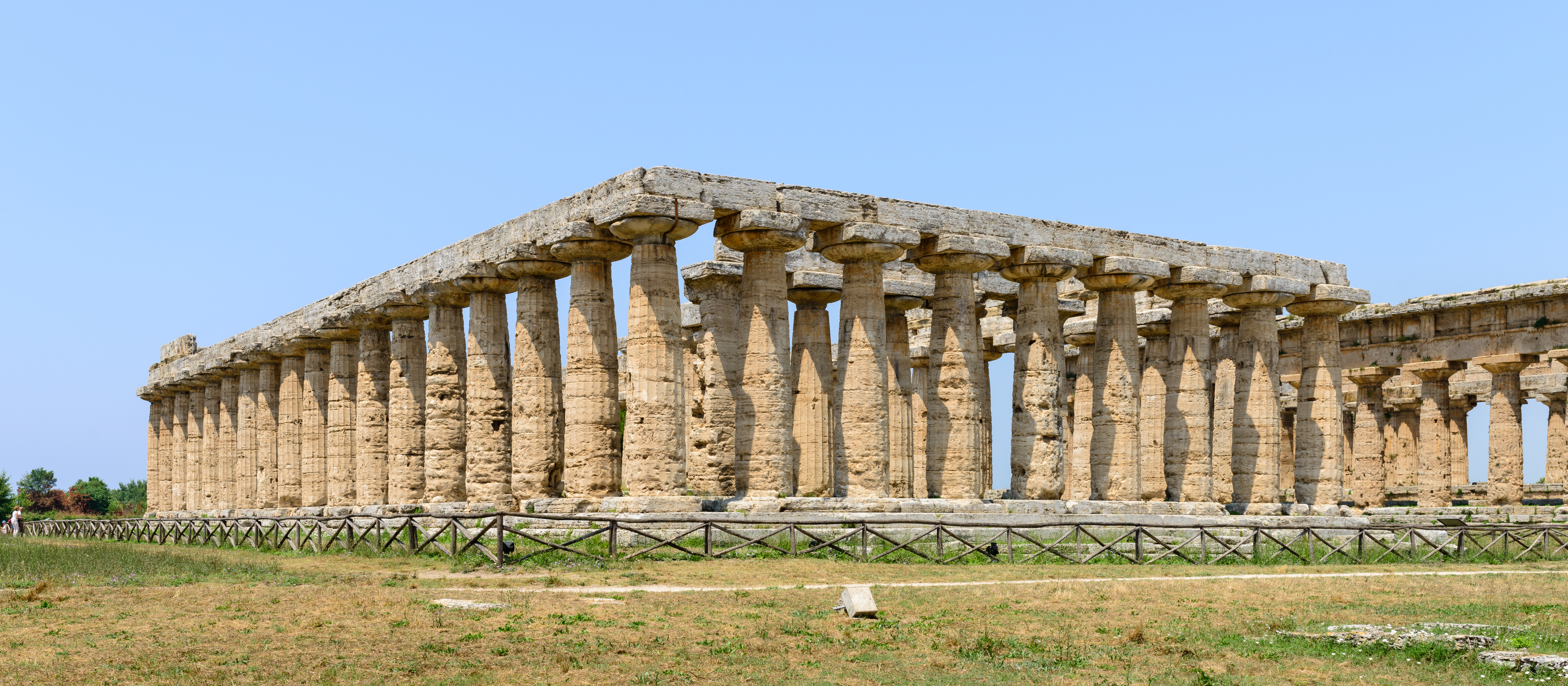
Paestum

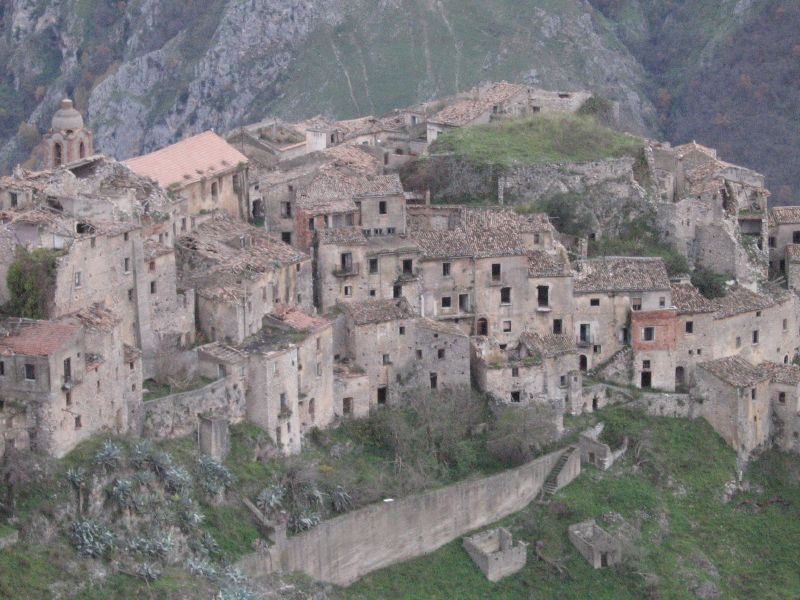
Romagnano al Monte

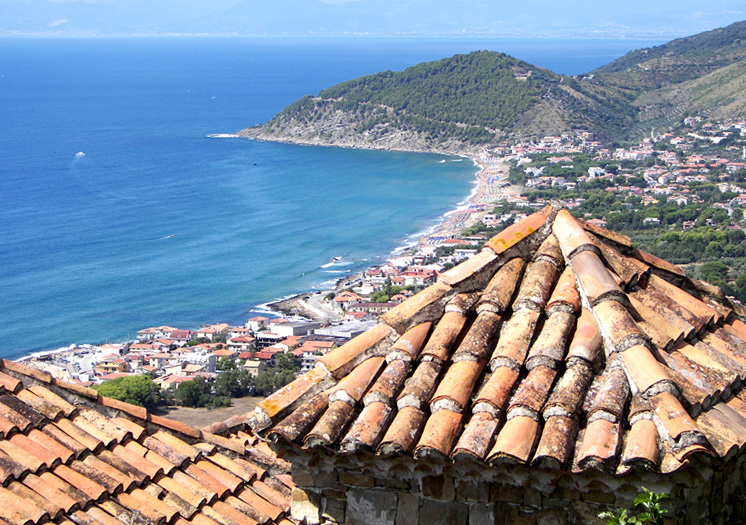
S.Maria di Castellabate

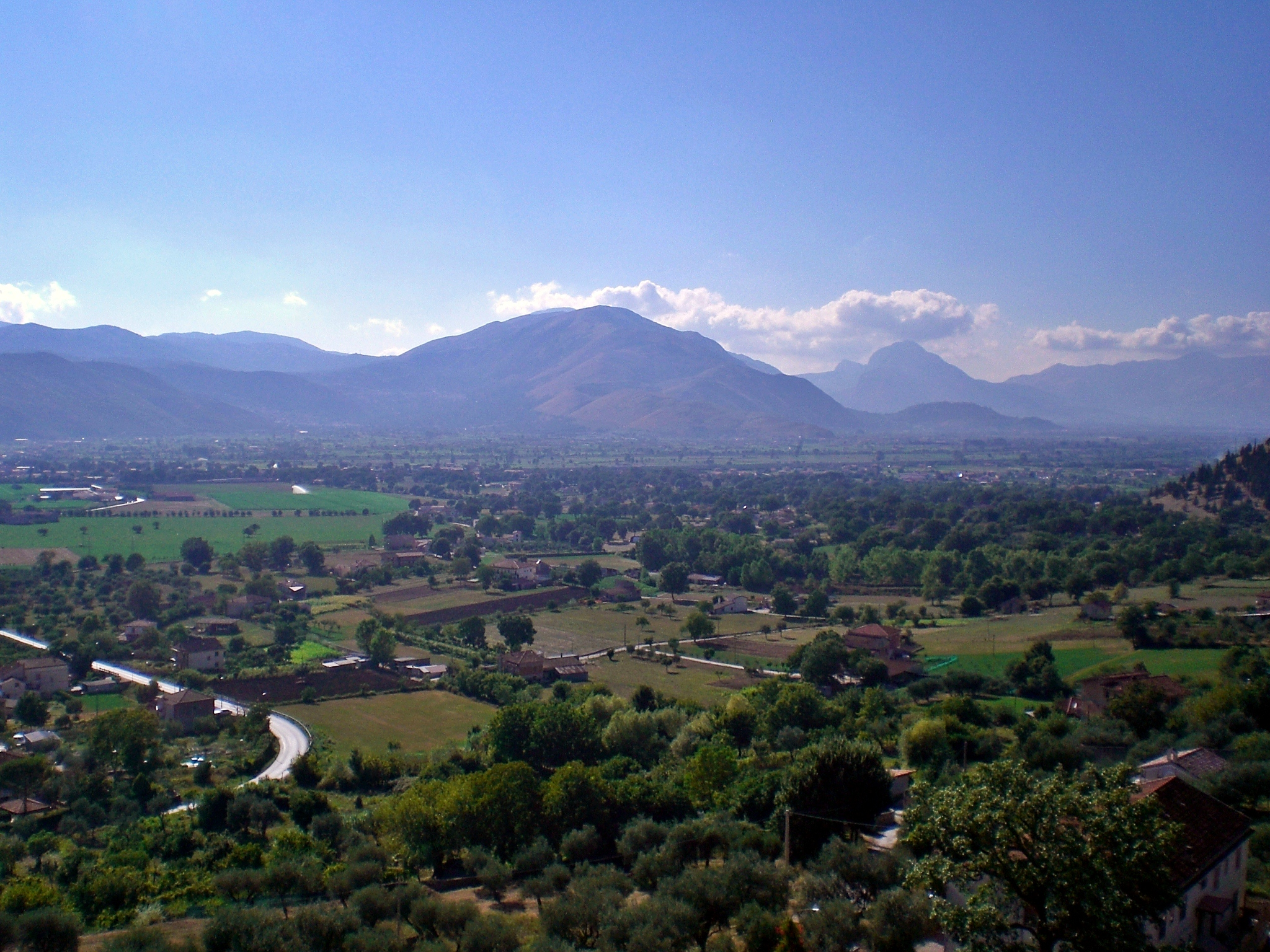
Vallo di Diano

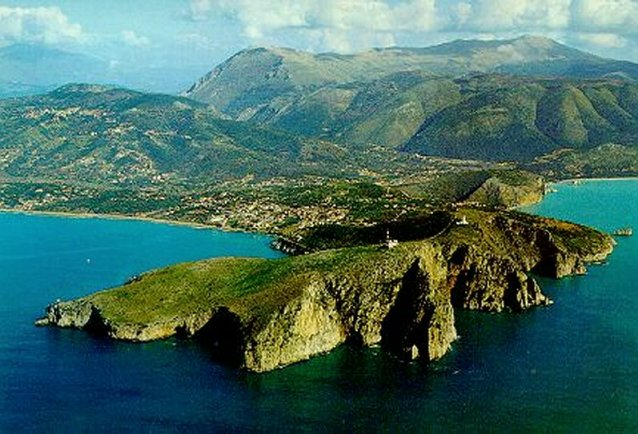
Cape Palinuro

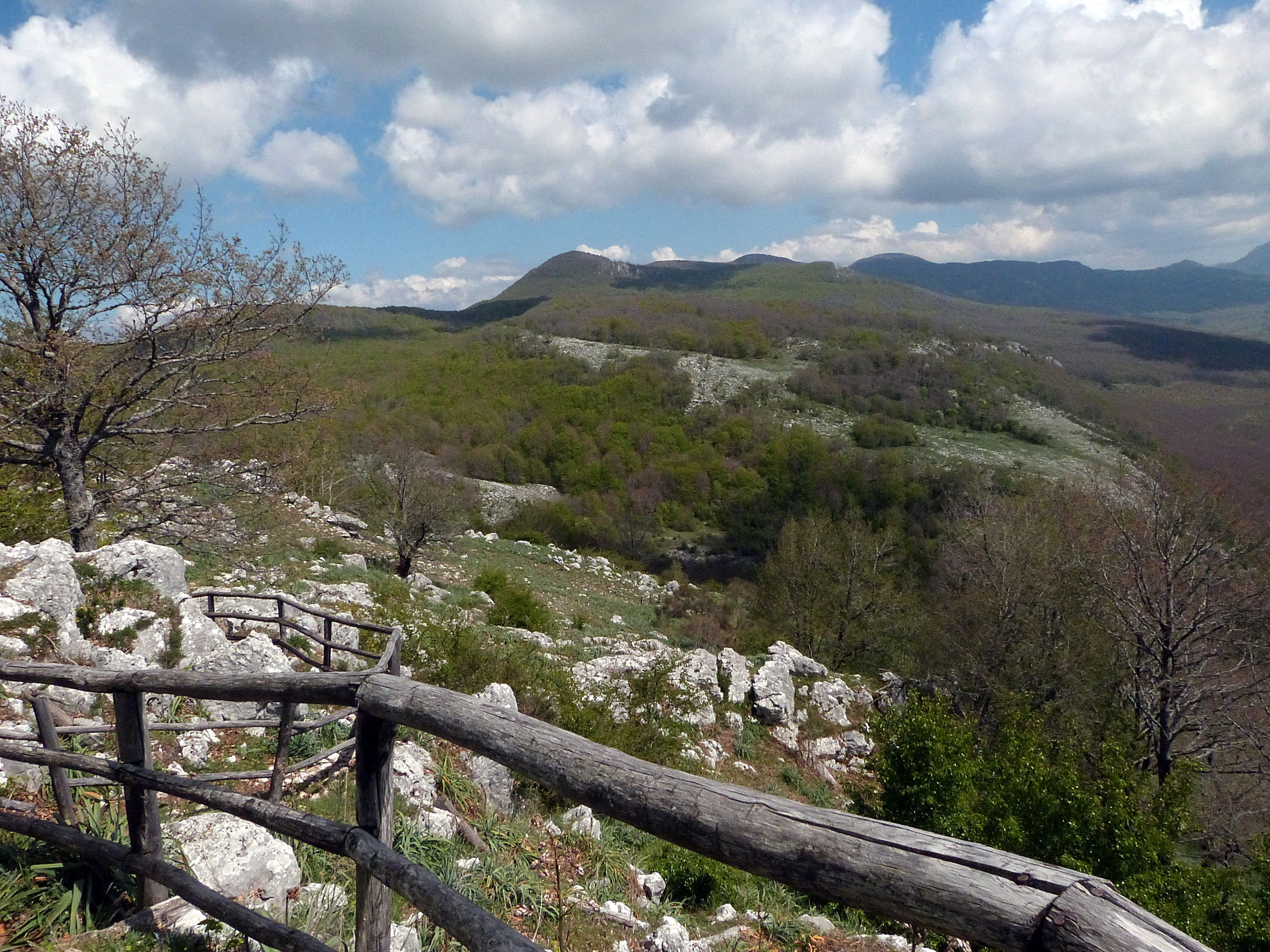
View from Alburni mounts

== See also ==
- Cilento and Vallo di Diano National Park
- Vallo di Diano
- Velia ("Elea")
- Paestum ("Poseidonia")
- Pruno Cilento
- Cilentan language
- Gulf of Salerno
- Agropoli
- Vallo della Lucania
- Sapri
- Sala Consilina
- Marina di Camerota
- Certosa di Padula (Padula)
- Cape Palinuro (Palinuro)
