= San Cono =

San Cono refers to the following places in Italy:

- San Cono, Sicily, comune, Province of Catania
- San Cono (Cessaniti), frazione of Cessaniti comune, Province of Vibo Valentia
- San Cono (Rometta), frazione of Rometta comune, Province of Messina
- San Cono (Tripi), frazione of Tripi comune, Province of Messina

== See also ==
- Saint Conus
