= Sala Consilina =

Comune in Campania, Italy

- Comune
- Comune di Sala Consilina
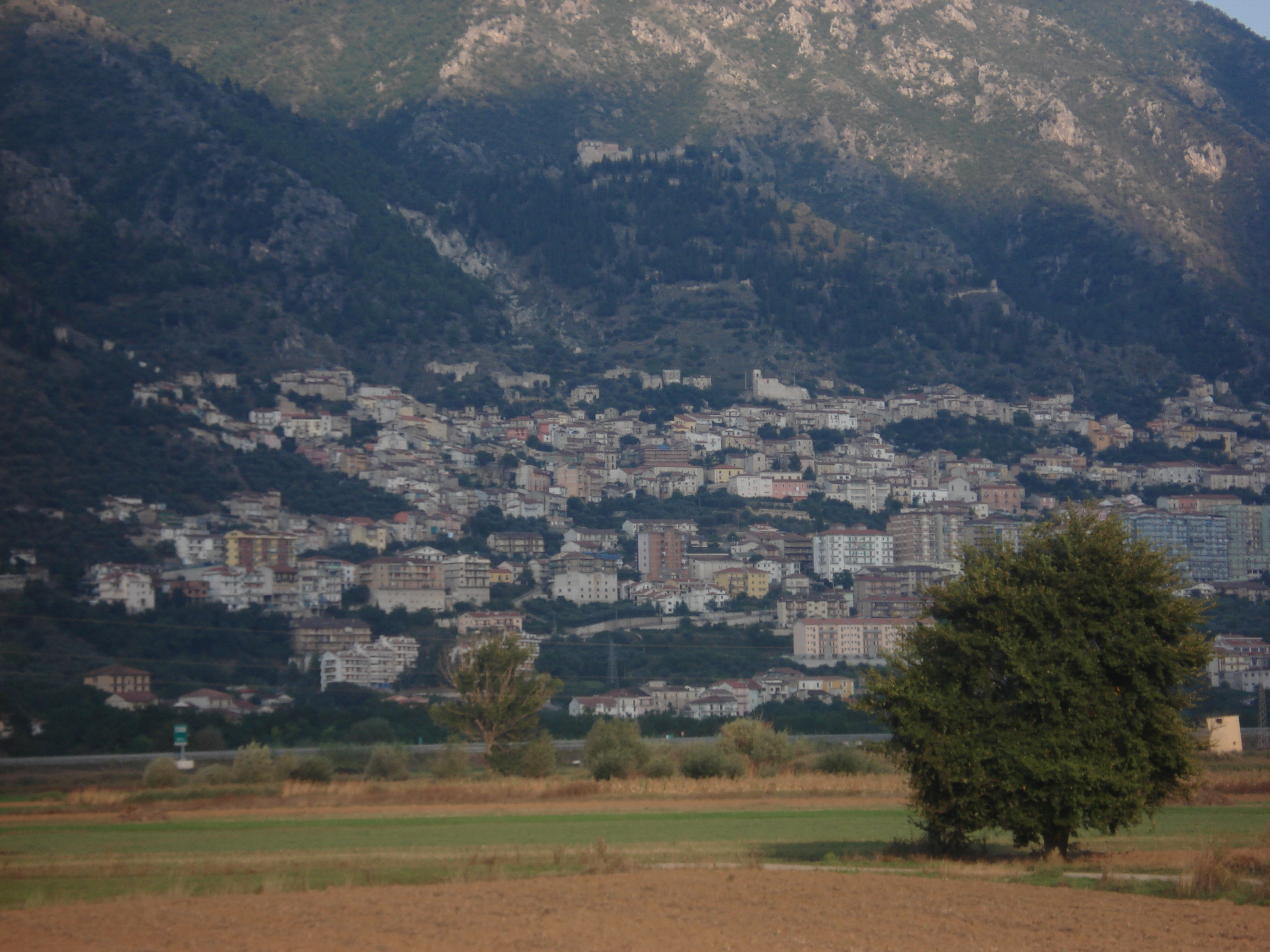
- Panoramic view of Sala Consilina

- Coat of arms

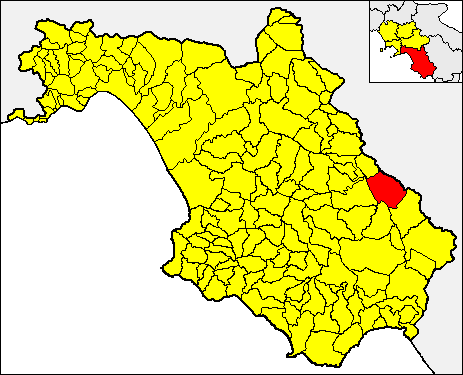
- Sala Consilina within the Province of Salerno

- Location within Italy Location within Campania
- Coordinates: 40°24′N 15°36′E
- Country: Italy
- Region: Campania
- Province: Salerno (SA)
- Frazioni: Grecia, Quattro Querce, San Raffaele, San Rocco, San Sebastiano, Sant'Antonio, Santo Leo, Trinità

Government
  - Mayor: Francesco Cavallone

Area
  - Total: 59.7 km^{2} (23.1 sq mi)
- Elevation: 914 m (2,999 ft)

Population (28 February 2017)
  - Total: 12,635
  - Density: 212/km^{2} (548/sq mi)
- Demonym: Salesi
- Time zone: UTC+1 (CET)
  - Summer (DST): UTC+2 (CEST)
- Postal code: 84036
- Dialing code: 0975
- Patron saint: St. Michael
- Saint day: September 29
- Website: Official website

Sala Consilina is a town and comune in the province of Salerno in the Campania region of southwestern Italy. With 12,635 inhabitants it is the most populated town of Vallo di Diano.

== History ==
The ancient village of Consilinum was built during the Roman Era.

== Geography ==
Sala Consilina is located in the middle area of Vallo di Diano, close to the borders of Campania with Basilicata. The bordering municipalities are Atena Lucana, Brienza (PZ), Marsico Nuovo (PZ), Padula, Sassano, San Rufo and Teggiano.

== People ==
Sala Consilina was arguably the birthplace of Giovanni Martini and the parents of The Real Housewives of New Jersey star Teresa Giudice.

== See also ==
- Cilento
- Vallo di Diano
