= Sanza, Campania =

Sanza
- Comune
- Comune di Sanza
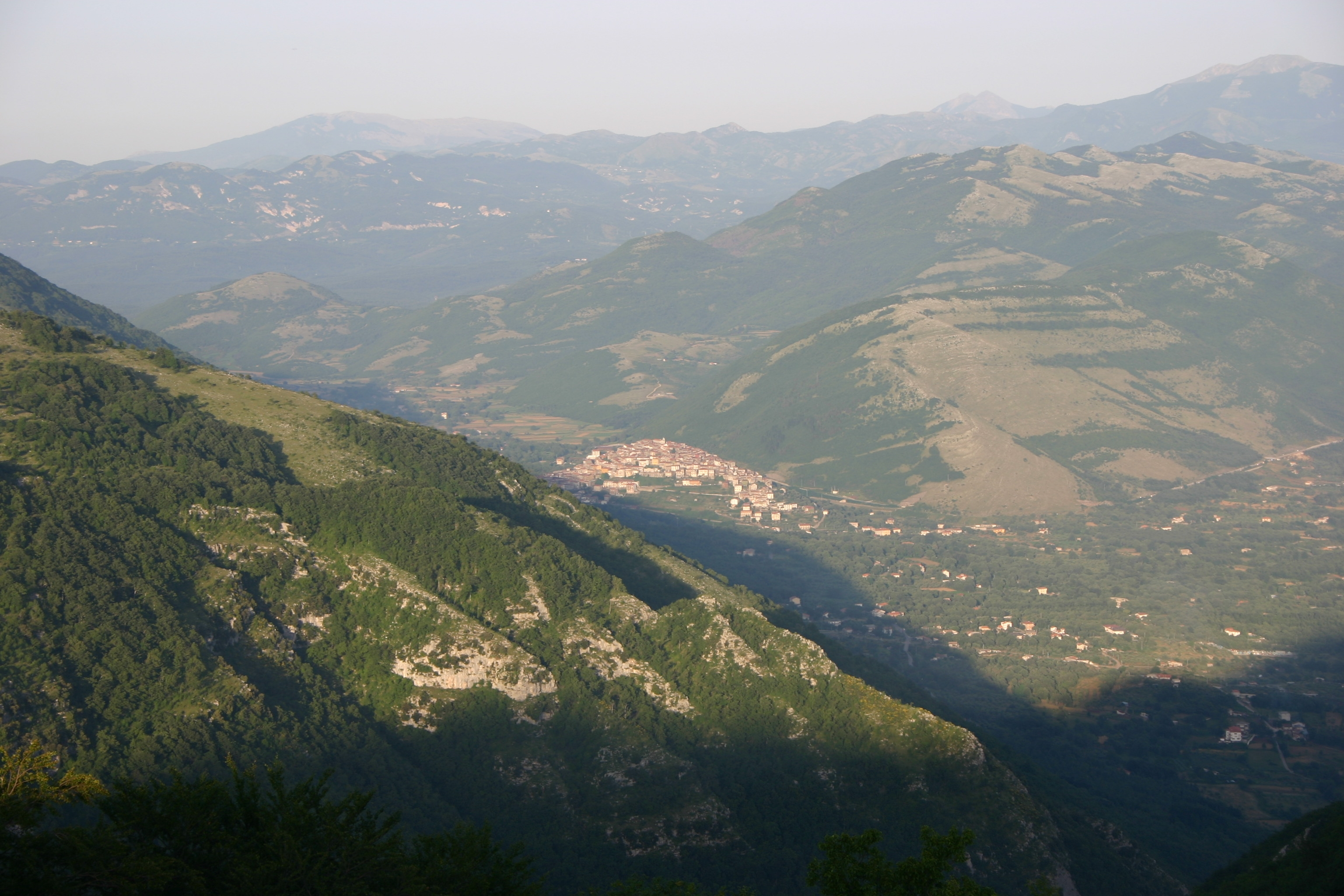

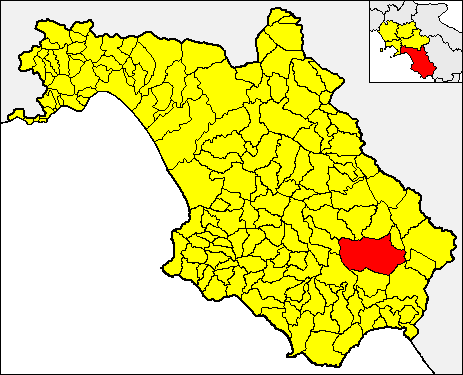
- Sanza within the Province of Salerno

- Location within Italy Location within Campania
- Coordinates: 40°15′N 15°33′E
- Country: Italy
- Region: Campania
- Province: Salerno (SA)
- Frazioni: San Donato, Varivertola

Area
  - Total: 128.75 km^{2} (49.71 sq mi)
- Elevation: 558 m (1,831 ft)

Population (2018-01-01)
  - Total: 3,007
  - Density: 23.36/km^{2} (60.49/sq mi)
- Demonym: Sanzesi
- Time zone: UTC+1 (CET)
  - Summer (DST): UTC+2 (CEST)
- Postal code: 84030
- Dialing code: 0975
- Patron saint: San Sabino
- Saint day: 18 September
- Website: Official website

Sanza is a town and comune in the province of Salerno in the Campania region of southern Italy.

== History ==
It is a small town placed on a hill surrounded by mountains. In ancient times it was protected by walls and there were few gates to access the village.

== Geography ==
The town is bordered by Buonabitacolo, Casalbuono, Casaletto Spartano, Caselle in Pittari, Monte San Giacomo, Montesano sulla Marcellana, Piaggine, Rofrano, Sassano and Valle dell'Angelo, located near the larger town of Sala Consilina.

Sanza counts the hamlets (frazioni) of San Donato and Varivertola. In the north-western area of its territory is located the mount Cervati.

== Feast Day ==
Sanza's biggest day of the year is August 5; a day in which all of its patrons pay homage to their other beloved saint, La Madonna Della Neve (Mary of the Snows.) In late July, a group of men carrying the heavy statue of La Madonna on their shoulders are followed by the people of Sanza as they ascend Monte Cervati (a nearby mountain in the Cilento region). The statue is then left in the small chapel at the very top. Then several days later, Sanza's devoted people, ranging from young children, to old men and women with walking sticks, once again follow La Madonna's descent back down the mountain. After a 26 kilometer journey ranging from around 2 or 3 am, up until when the people return, all those who had come down the mountain create a procession through the tight cobblestoned streets of Sanza, singing loudly and continuing to carry La Madonna.

== See also ==
- Cilento
- Vallo di Diano
- Cilento National Park
- Pruno Cilento
- Mount Cervati
