= Salento (disambiguation) =

Salento can mean:

- Salento, an area of south-eastern Apulia, Italy
- Salento, Campania, a municipality of the province of Salerno, Campania, Italy
- Salento, Quindío, a municipality in the department of Quindío, Colombia
- Salentino, a dialect spoken in the Apulian area of Salento
