= Controne =

- Comune
- Comune di Controne
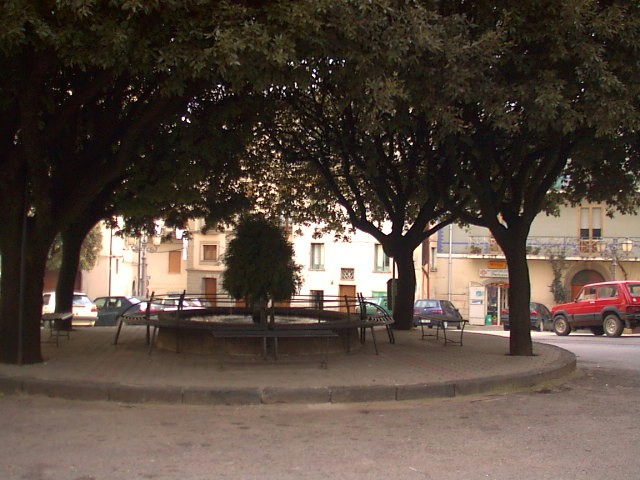
- St. Mary's church

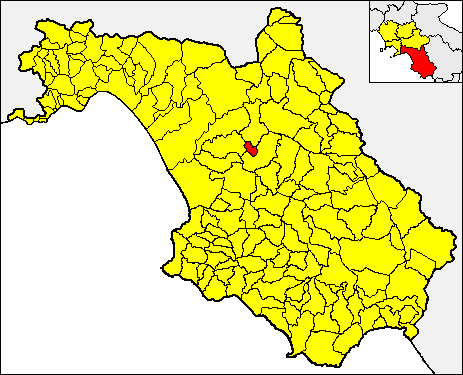
- Controne within the Province of Salerno

- Location within Italy Location within Campania
- Coordinates: 40°30′N 15°12′E
- Country: Italy
- Region: Campania
- Province: Salerno (SA)

Government
  - Mayor: Ettore Poti (Lista Civica)

Area
  - Total: 7.75 km^{2} (2.99 sq mi)
- Elevation: 210 m (690 ft)

Population (1 January 2018)
  - Total: 867
  - Density: 112/km^{2} (290/sq mi)
- Demonym: Contronesi
- Time zone: UTC+1 (CET)
  - Summer (DST): UTC+2 (CEST)
- Postal code: 84020
- Dialing code: 0828
- ISTAT code: 065045
- Patron saint: St. Donato, St. Nicola
- Saint day: August 7, December 6
- Website: Official website

Controne is a town and comune in the province of Salerno in the Campania region of southwestern Italy.

== History ==
In 2015 Mayor Nicola Pastore issued an ordinance stating that dogs are not permitted to bark between 2pm and 4pm, the period of Italian napping, and during evening hours.

== Geography ==
The town is situated in the middle of Cilento, by the western side of the Alburni mountains, and its territory is part of the Cilento and Vallo di Diano National Park. The municipality has an area on 7 km^{2} and is bordered by Altavilla Silentina, Castelcivita and Postiglione.

== Gallery ==
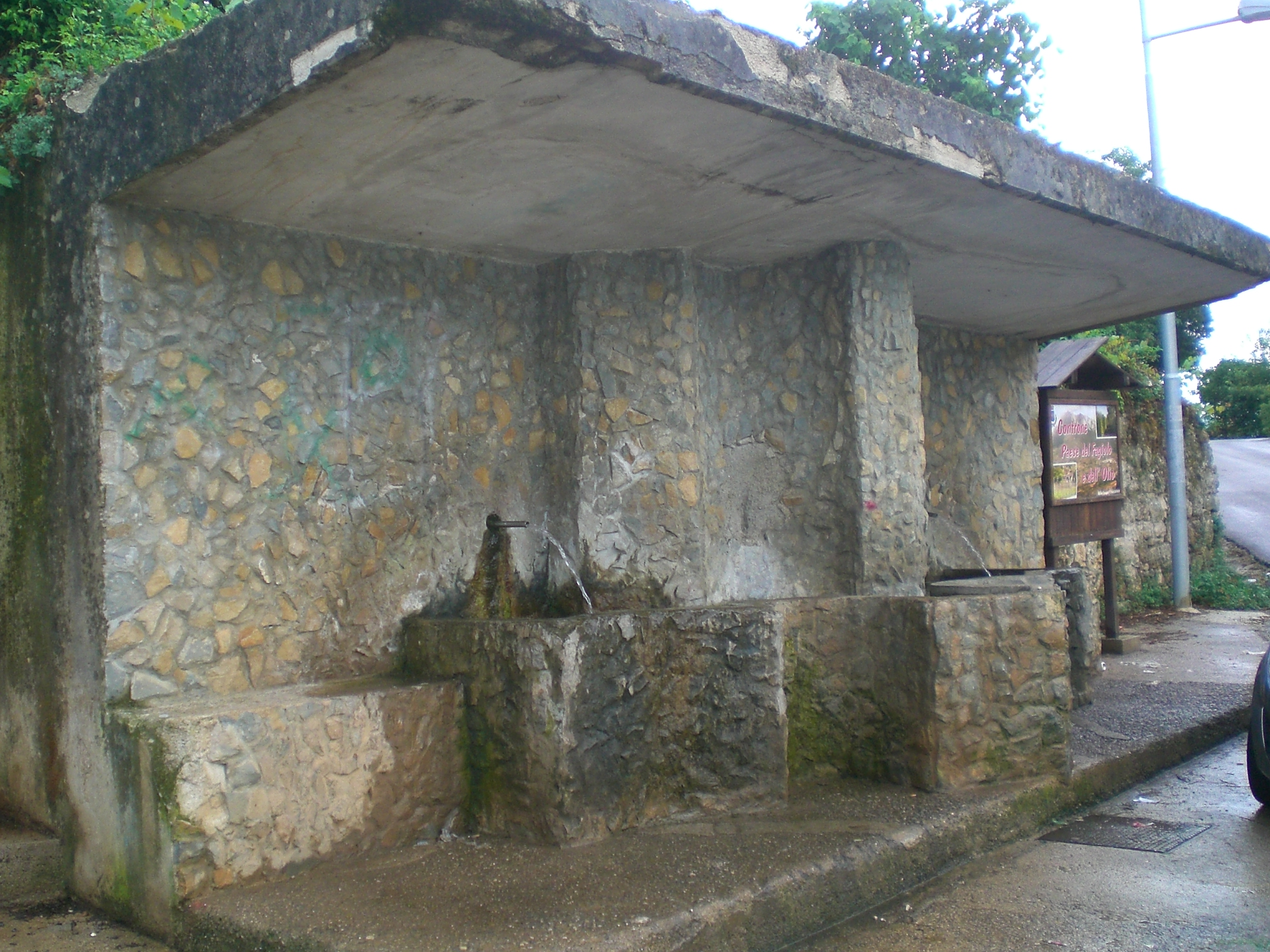
Acquaviva Fountain

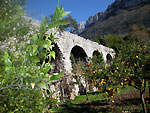
Aqueduct

== See also ==
- Cilento
- Cilentan dialect
