= Saint Conus =

Italian Roman Catholic saint

Saint Cono
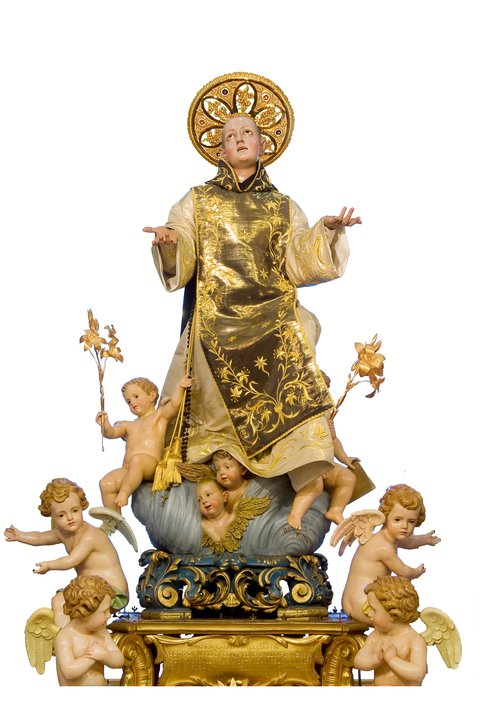
- Saint Cono
- Born: End of the 12th century Diano, Italy
- Died: First half of the 13th century Cadossa, Italy
- Venerated in: Roman Catholic Church
- Canonized: April 27, 1871 by Pope Pius IX
- Feast: 3 June
- Patronage: Teggiano, Italy

Cono was a Benedictine monk. He was born in Diano (Italy) in the late 12th century, and became a monk in S.Maria di Cadossa Benedictine Monastery (now St. Cono sanctuary) near Montesano sulla Marcellana. He died very young in the early years of the 13th century with a reputation for holiness. When Cadossa monastery was closed his relics were returned to Diano in 1261, where he is venerated as its patron saint.

The Saint was canonized on April 27, 1871 by Pope Pius IX. The feast is celebrated on June 3.

He is the patron saint of Teggiano. Celebrations in his honor are celebrated in Florida, Uruguay, Buenos Aires, Brooklyn, San Mauro Pascoli, and San Cono di Cessaniti.
