= Giungano =

- Comune
- Comune di Giungano
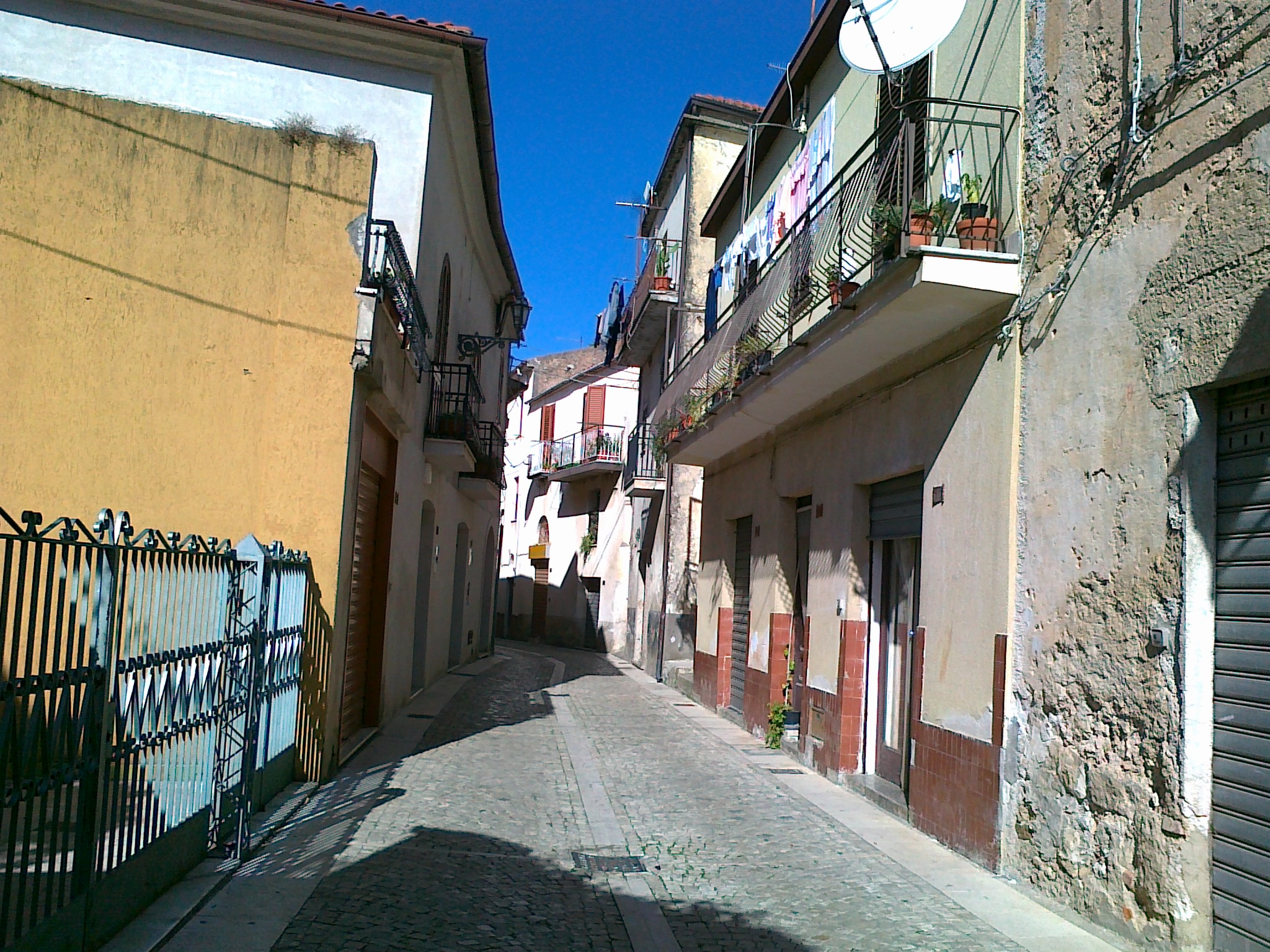
- A road in the old town

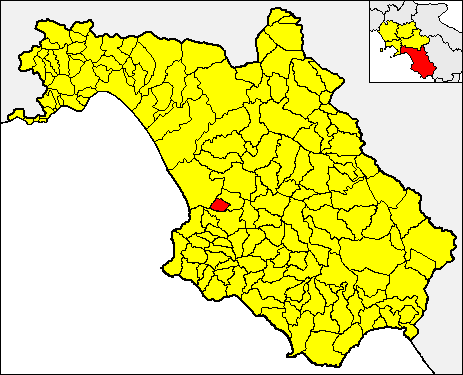
- Giungano within the Province of Salerno

- Location within Italy Location within Campania
- Coordinates: 40°24′N 15°7′E
- Country: Italy
- Region: Campania
- Province: Salerno (SA)

Government
  - Mayor: Giuseppe Orlotti

Area
  - Total: 11 km^{2} (4.2 sq mi)
- Elevation: 250 m (820 ft)

Population (31 August 2017)
  - Total: 1,307
  - Density: 120/km^{2} (310/sq mi)
- Demonym: Giunganesi
- Time zone: UTC+1 (CET)
  - Summer (DST): UTC+2 (CEST)
- Postal code: 84050
- Dialing code: 0828
- Website: Official website

Giungano (Campanian: Jungane) is a town and comune in the province of Salerno in the Campania region of south-western Italy.

== Geography ==
The municipality is located in northern Cilento and borders with Capaccio, Cicerale and Trentinara. It is not too far from the town of Agropoli and to the ancient Greek site of Paestum.

== See also ==
- Cilentan dialect
- Cilento and Vallo di Diano National Park
