= Laurito =

- Comune
- Comune di Laurito
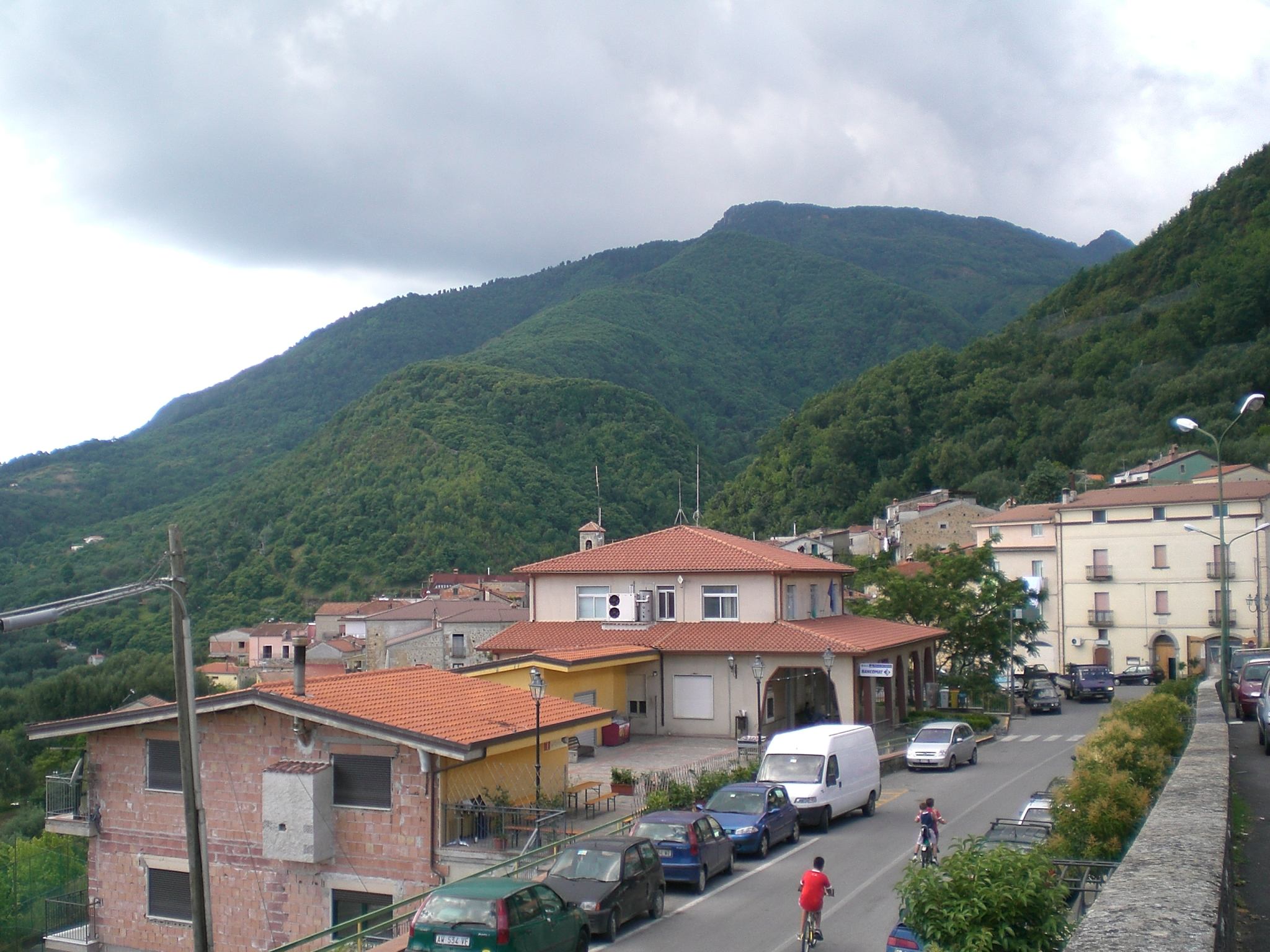

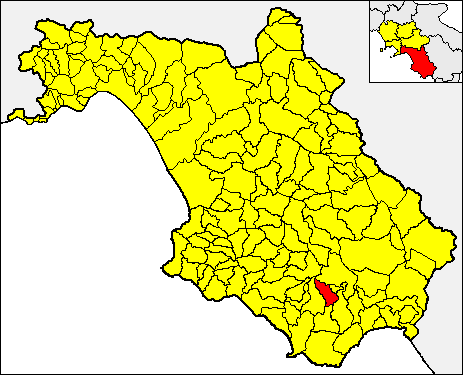
- Laurito within the Province of Salerno

- Location within Italy Location within Campania
- Coordinates: 40°10′N 15°24′E
- Country: Italy
- Region: Campania
- Province: Province of Salerno (SA)

Area
  - Total: 19 km^{2} (7.3 sq mi)

Population (2018-01-01)
  - Total: 941
  - Density: 50/km^{2} (130/sq mi)
- Time zone: UTC+1 (CET)
  - Summer (DST): UTC+2 (CEST)
- Postal code: 84050
- Dialing code: 0974
- Website: www.comune.laurito.sa.it

Laurito is a town and comune in the province of Salerno Campania, southern Italy, about 200 km south of Naples.

== See also ==
- Cilento
