= Montesano sulla Marcellana =

- Comune
- Comune di Montesano sulla Marcellana
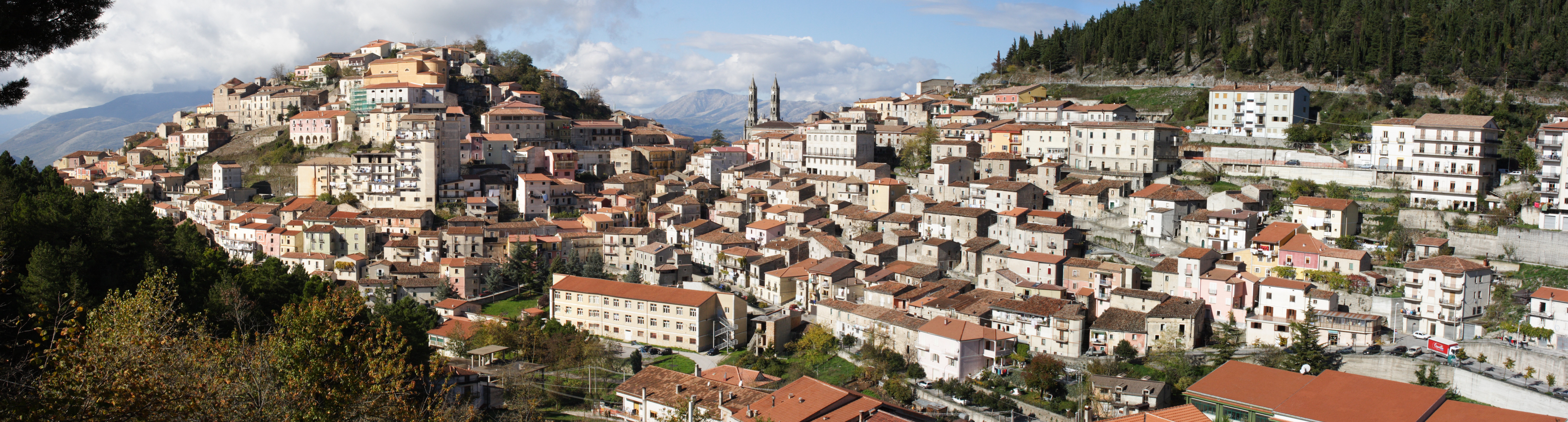
- Panoramic view

- Coat of arms

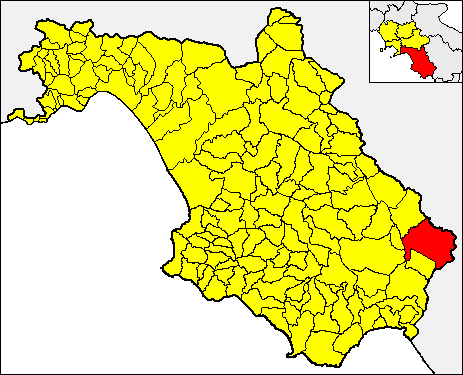
- Montesano within the Province of Salerno

- Location within Italy Location within Campania
- Coordinates: 40°17′N 15°42′E
- Country: Italy
- Region: Campania
- Province: Salerno (SA)
- Frazioni: Arenabianca, Cessuta, Magorno, Montesano Scalo, Prato Comune, Tardiano

Government
  - Mayor: Giuseppe Rinaldi

Area
  - Total: 110.22 km^{2} (42.56 sq mi)
- Elevation: 850 m (2,790 ft)

Population (30 November 2017)
  - Total: 6,542
  - Density: 59.35/km^{2} (153.7/sq mi)
- Demonym: Montesanesi
- Time zone: UTC+1 (CET)
  - Summer (DST): UTC+2 (CEST)
- Postal code: 84033
- Dialing code: 0975
- Patron saint: St. Nicholas of Bari
- Website: Official website

Montesano sulla Marcellana (colloquially named Montesano) is a town and comune of the province of Salerno in the Campania region of south-west Italy.

== Etymology ==
It is said that the inhabitants of "Marcellinum", the lower area of the current town, went over the hill to escape from the unhealthy air and water caused by marshes and plague. The new town, founded around the year 1000, was therefore called "Montesano" ("healthy mountain"). The toponym "sulla Marcellana" ("over Marcellana") results from the original place "Marcellinum".

== Geography ==
Located in the south of Campania bordering Basilicata, Montesano is the easternmost municipality of its region. Its territory, part of the Vallo di Diano, is included in the Cilento, Vallo di Diano and Alburni National Park.

The municipality borders Buonabitacolo, Casalbuono, Grumento Nova, Lagonegro, Moliterno, Padula, Sanza and Tramutola. It counts the hamlets (frazioni) of Arenabianca, Cessuta, Magorno, Montesano Scalo, Prato Comune and Tardiano.

=== Natural areas ===
The vast municipal territory is made up of valleys, hills, and mountains.

"Cerreta-Cognola" regional park is a place which hosts a large wood of centuries-old trees. Indeed, Montesano boasts 4000 hectares of forest area, one of the largest in Vallo di Diano. Located between Montesano Scalo, Buonabitacolo, Casalbuono and Sanza, the park houses various wild animal species which are almost disappeared, such as wild boars, fallow deer, roe deer and mouflons.

Directly south of the town of Montesano are found springs of mineral water. Spring water from this area is bottled and sold nationally.

=== Climate ===
Montesano presents a warm temperate climate, humid in the lower area and dry in the upper area. Winters are short with low temperatures, especially in the highlands, and summers are hot.

== Main sights ==
The main sights of the town include various churches and monasteries, such as the Abbey of Santa Maria of Cadossa (a renovated ex-Benedictine monastery) and Santa Maria of Loreto Church.

The Sant’Anna church, located in the town's main square, is a majestic Neo-Gothic church. It was built between 1954 and 1959 at the request of Filippo Gagliardi, an entrepreneur and Montesano native who left his town, made his fortune in Venezuela, and donated much of it to public and philanthropic works in Italy.

== Economy ==
The economy is primarily based on agriculture and handicraft. Livestock farming allows the production of meat and milk.

In the town, there is a factory for the bottling of mineral water sourced from nearby springs. A spa complex, built in the 1970s, also took advantage of the spring water, and was a driver for tourism until its abandonment in the late 2000s.

== Twin towns ==
- Villa Mercedes, Argentina

== See also ==
- Cilento
- Cilentan dialect
