= Monte San Giacomo =

- Comune
- Comune di Monte San Giacomo
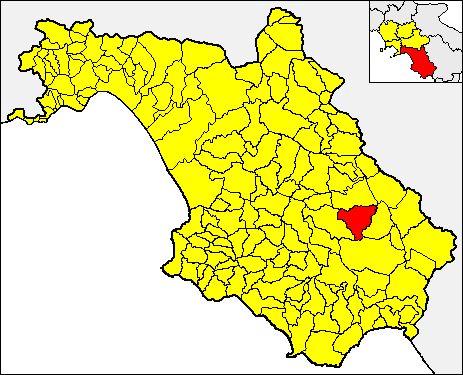
- Monte San Giacomo within the Province of Salerno

- Location within Italy Location within Campania
- Coordinates: 40°21′N 15°32′E
- Country: Italy
- Region: Campania
- Province: Salerno (SA)

Area
  - Total: 51 km^{2} (20 sq mi)

Population (1 April 2009)
  - Total: 1,653
  - Density: 32/km^{2} (84/sq mi)
- Demonym: Sangiacomesi
- Time zone: UTC+1 (CET)
  - Summer (DST): UTC+2 (CEST)
- Postal code: 84030
- Dialing code: 0975
- ISTAT code: 065075
- Patron saint: San Giacomo il Maggiore and Sant'Anna
- Saint day: 25 July and 26 July
- Website: Official website

Monte San Giacomo is a town and comune in the province of Salerno in the Campania region of south-western Italy.

== Geography ==
The municipality borders with Piaggine, Sanza, Sassano and Teggiano.

== See also ==
- Pruno Cilento
- Cilento
- Vallo di Diano
