= San Cono, Tripi =

San Cono
- Frazione
- Location within Italy
- Coordinates: 38°2′58″N 15°4′56″E
- Country: Italy
- Region: Sicily
- Perugia: Province of Messina (ME)
- Comune: Tripi
- Time zone: UTC+1 (CET)
  - Summer (DST): UTC+2 (CEST)
- Postcode: 98060
- Area code: 0941

San Cono is one of the frazioni of Tripi comune in the Province of Messina, Italy.
