= Postiglione =

- Comune
- Comune di Postiglione
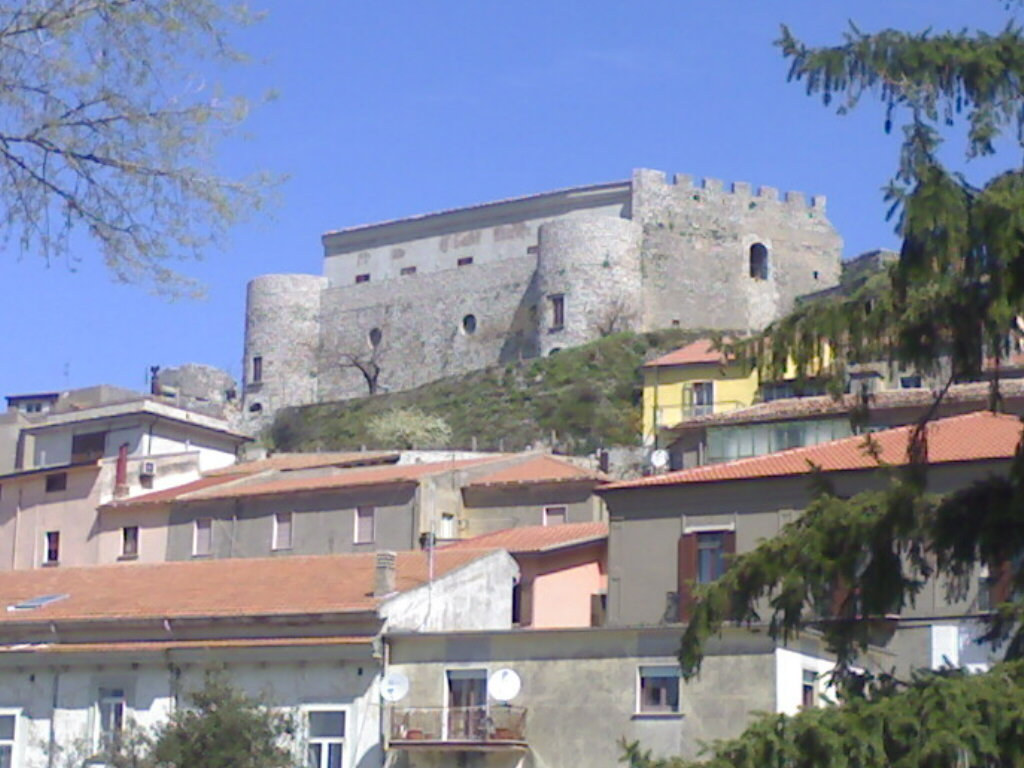
- The castle in town's center

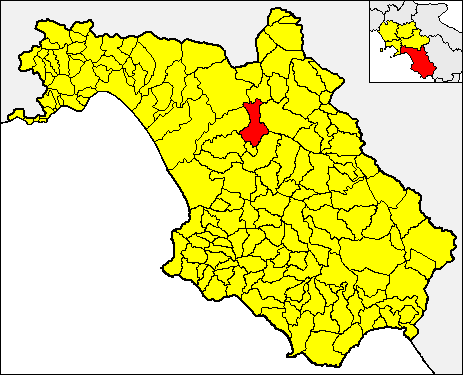

- Location within Italy Location within Campania
- Coordinates: 40°34′N 15°14′E
- Country: Italy
- Region: Campania
- Province: Salerno (SA)
- Frazioni: Canneto, Lagorosso, Selvanera, Terzo di Mezzo, Aquara, Pescara

Area
  - Total: 47 km^{2} (18 sq mi)
- Elevation: 605 m (1,985 ft)

Population (1 April 2009)
  - Total: 2,312
  - Density: 49/km^{2} (130/sq mi)
- Demonym: Postiglionesi
- Time zone: UTC+1 (CET)
  - Summer (DST): UTC+2 (CEST)
- Postal code: 84026
- Dialing code: 0828
- ISTAT code: 065101
- Patron saint: San Giorgio and San Nicola
- Saint day: 23 April
- Website: Official website

Postiglione (Campanian: Pustiglione) is a town and comune in the province of Salerno in the Campania region of south-western Italy.

== Geography ==
Located in Cilento, below the Alburni mountains, the comune borders the municipalities of Altavilla Silentina, Campagna, Castelcivita, Controne, Contursi Terme, Serre and Sicignano degli Alburni.

Postiglione counts 5 frazioni: Canneto, Duchessa, Selvanera, Terzo di Mezzo and Zancuso. Canneto, located on the road between Postiglione and Controne, is the most populated frazioni.
