= Vallo di Diano =

Valley in Salerno, Italy

UNESCO World Heritage Site
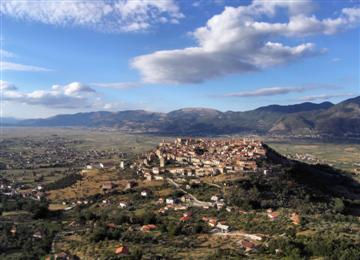
- Panoramic view of Teggiano

- Location within Campania Location within Italy
- Location: Province of Salerno, Campania, Italy
- Part of: "Paestum, Velia, the Certosa di Padula, Mount Cervati and the Vallo di Diano" part of Cilento and Vallo di Diano National Park with the Archeological Sites of Paestum and Velia, and the Certosa di Padula
- Criteria: Cultural: (iii)(iv)
- Reference: 842-001
- Inscription: 1998 (22nd Session)
- Coordinates: 40°24′N 15°34′E

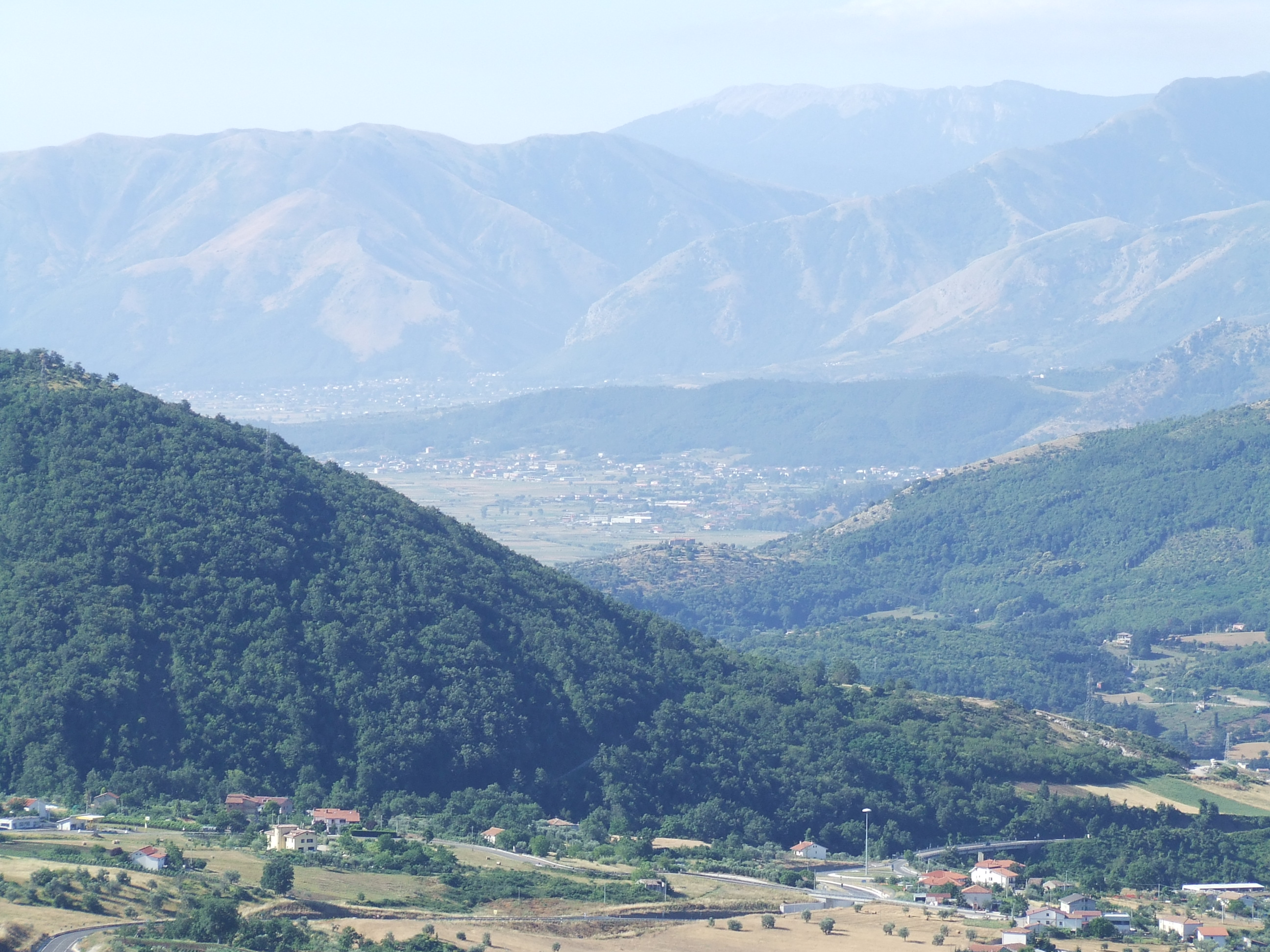
Vallo di Diano seen from Caggiano.

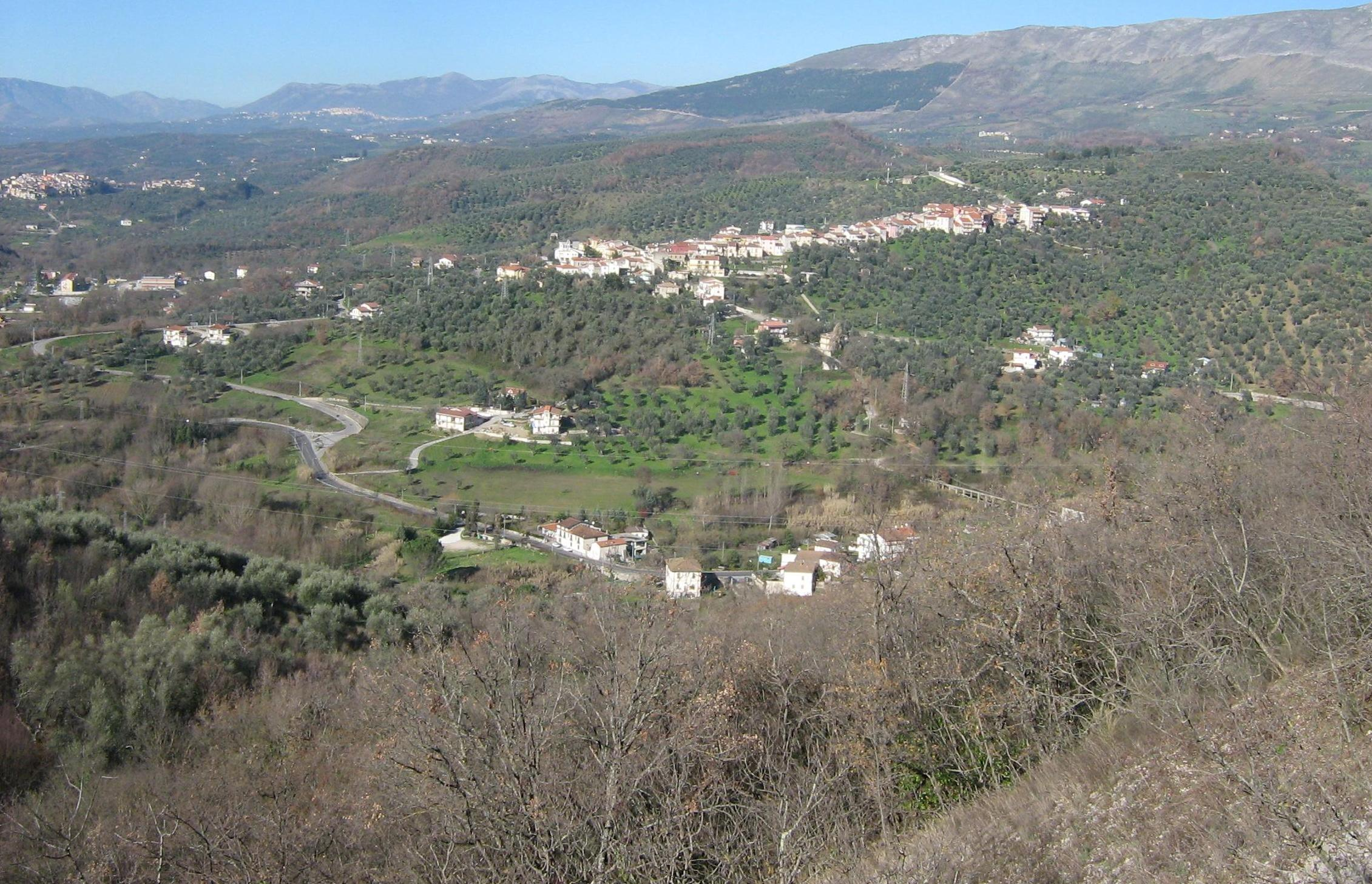
Panoramic view of Pertosa.

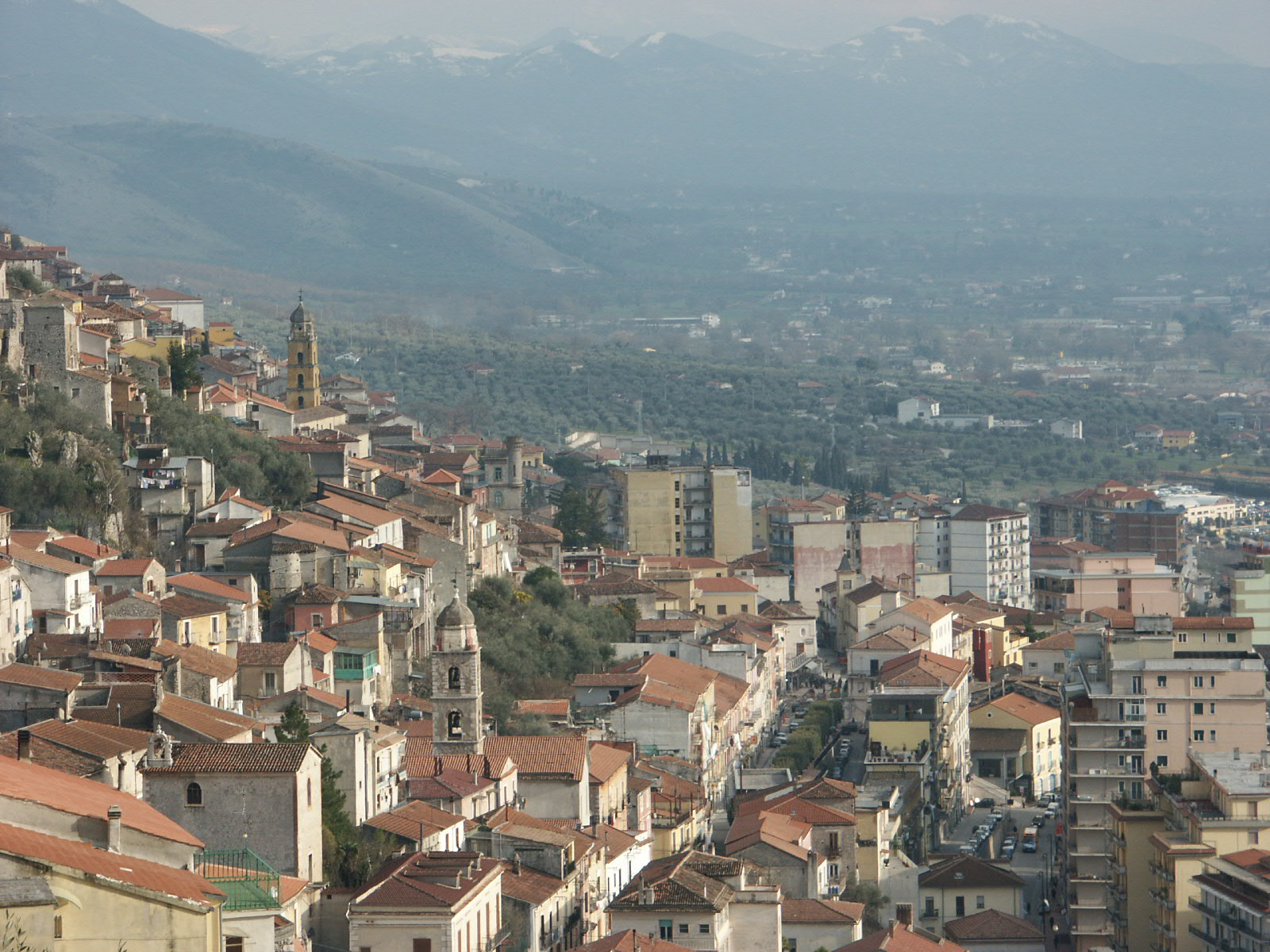
View of Sala Consilina's Old Town. In background, the southern part of the valley.

The Vallo di Diano (also known as Valdiano) is an Italian valley of the south-eastern side of Campania, in the province of Salerno.

== Geography ==
Situated between the Alburni mountains and the borders of Campania with Basilicata, it is considered a geographical subregion of Cilento and is part of the Cilento and Vallo di Diano National Park, World Heritage Site of Italy from 1998. The greatest forestal park, mainly located in cilentan side, is Pruno.

The area is composed by 17 municipalities, and the greatest one is Sala Consilina, with c. 12,500 inhabitants. The others are Atena Lucana, Auletta, Buonabitacolo, Caggiano, Casalbuono, Monte San Giacomo, Montesano sulla Marcellana, Padula, Pertosa, Polla, San Pietro al Tanagro, Sant'Arsenio, San Rufo, Sanza, Sassano and Teggiano.

== Transport ==
The valley is served by the A2 motorway Salerno-Reggio Calabria, with the exits of Petina, Polla, Atena Lucana, Sala Consilina and Padula-Buonabitacolo. From this last exit it departs a speedway to Policastro Bussentino and Sapri with exits in Buonabitacolo and Sanza.

It was also served by the railway line Sicignano-Lagonegro, closed since 1987 for works and connected to Salerno–Potenza–Taranto railway line.

== See also ==
- Cilento
- Padula Charterhouse
- Pertosa Caves
- Cilentan Coast
- Cilento and Vallo di Diano National Park
- Cilentan language
