= San Pietro al Tanagro =

San Pietro al Tanagro San Pietro al Tanagro
- Comune
- Comune di San Pietro al Tanagro
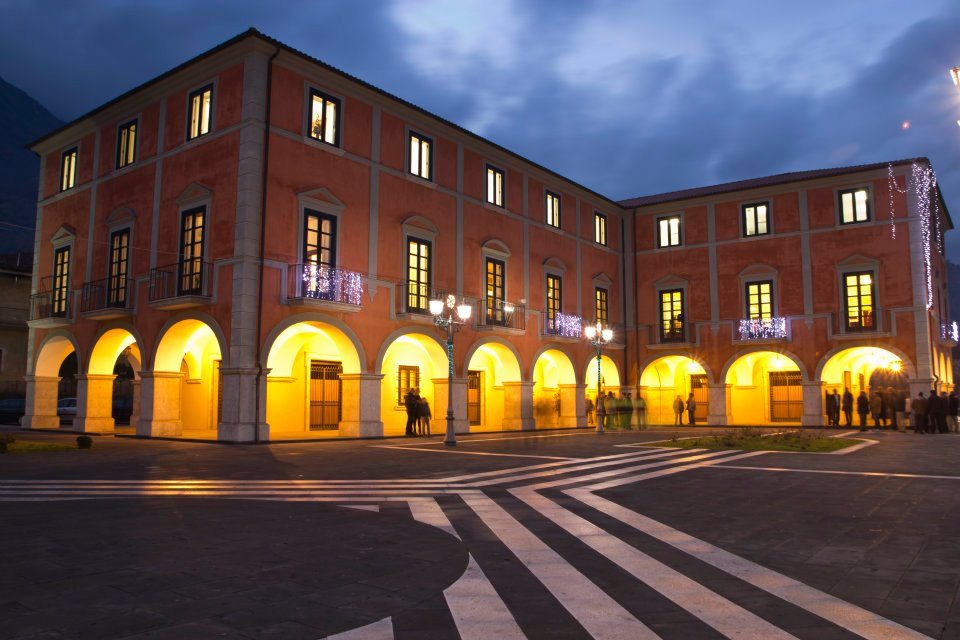
- San Pietro al Tanagro's town hall and Square.

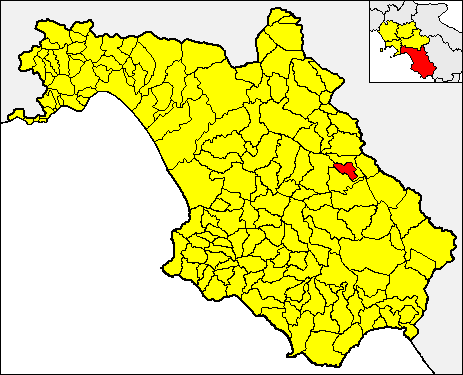
- San Pietro al Tanagro within the Province of Salerno

- Location within Italy Location within Campania
- Coordinates: 40°27′23″N 15°28′59″E
- Country: Italy
- Region: Campania
- Province: Salerno (SA)

Area
  - Total: 15 km^{2} (5.8 sq mi)

Population (2018-01-01)
  - Total: 1,664
  - Density: 110/km^{2} (290/sq mi)
- Demonym: Sanpietresi
- Time zone: UTC+1 (CET)
  - Summer (DST): UTC+2 (CEST)
- Postal code: 84030
- Dialing code: 0975
- Patron saint: St. Peter
- Saint day: 29th June

San Pietro al Tanagro is a village and comune in the province of Salerno in the Campania region of south-west Italy.

== Geography ==
San Pietro al Tanagro is 90 kilometers away from Salerno. It had a population of 1,644 inhabitants and a surface of 15,3 square kilometers thus showing a population density of 110/km^2. It rises 450 metres above sea level.

The municipality is bordered by Atena Lucana, Corleto Monforte, San Rufo, Sant'Arsenio and Teggiano.

== See also ==
- Vallo di Diano
- Alburni
