= Salento, Campania =

Salento
- Comune
- Comune di Salento
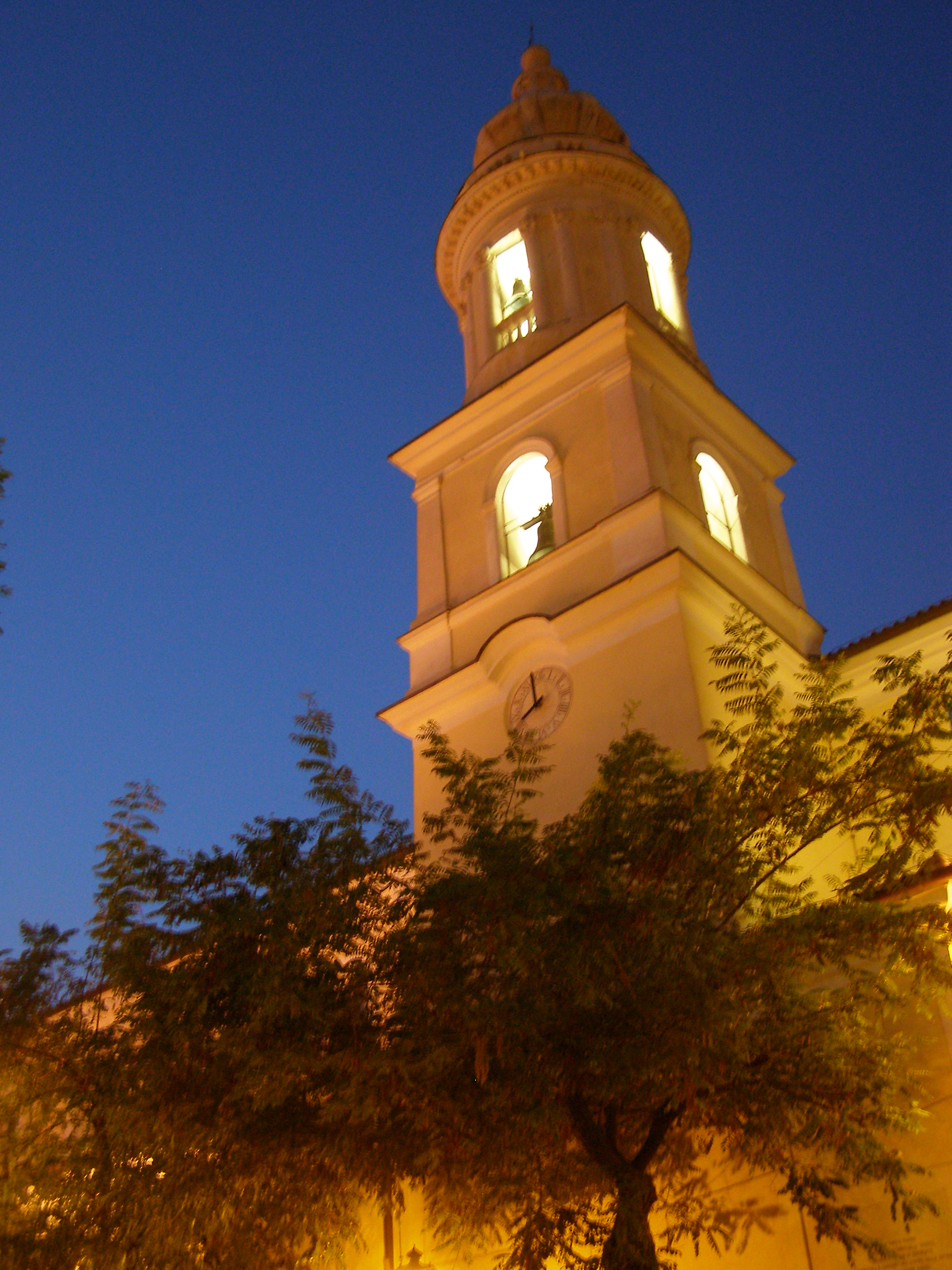
- Campanile di Salento

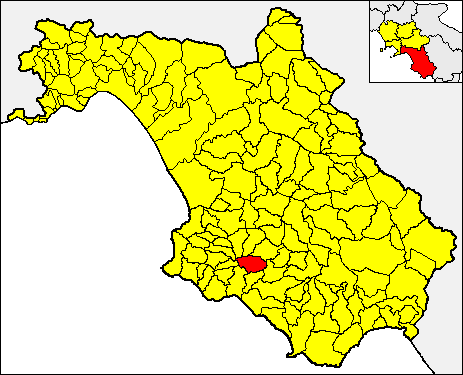
- Salento within the Province of Salerno

- Location within Italy Location within Campania
- Coordinates: 40°15′N 15°11′E
- Country: Italy
- Region: Campania
- Province: Salerno (SA)
- Frazioni: Fasana, Maroccia, Palazza

Area
  - Total: 23 km^{2} (8.9 sq mi)
- Elevation: 420 m (1,380 ft)

Population (1 April 2009)
  - Total: 2,049
  - Density: 89/km^{2} (230/sq mi)
- Demonym: Salentini
- Time zone: UTC+1 (CET)
  - Summer (DST): UTC+2 (CEST)
- Postal code: 84070
- Dialing code: 0974
- ISTAT code: 065115
- Patron saint: Santa Barbara
- Saint day: 4 December (votivo 29 July)
- Website: Official website

Salento is a town and comune in the Cilento area, province of Salerno, in the Campania region of south-western Italy.
