= Sassano =

- Comune
- Comune di Sassano
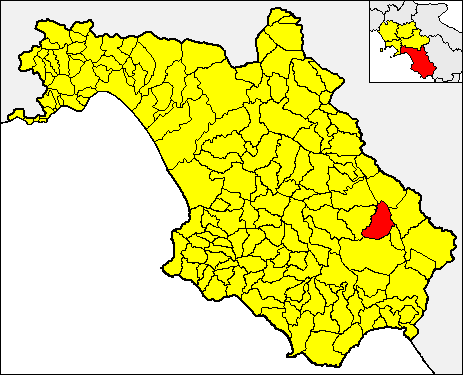
- Sassano within the Province of Salerno

- Location within Italy Location within Campania
- Coordinates: 40°20′N 15°34′E
- Country: Italy
- Region: Campania
- Province: Salerno (SA)
- Frazioni: Caiazzano, Peglio, San Rocco, Santa Maria, Silla, Varco Notar Ercole

Government
  - Mayor: Domenico Rubino

Area
  - Total: 47.76 km^{2} (18.44 sq mi)

Population (28 February 2017)
  - Total: 4,939
  - Density: 103.4/km^{2} (267.8/sq mi)
- Demonym: Sassanesi
- Time zone: UTC+1 (CET)
  - Summer (DST): UTC+2 (CEST)
- Postal code: 84038
- Dialing code: 0975
- ISTAT code: 065136
- Patron saint: San Giovanni Battista
- Website: Official website

Sassano is a town and comune in the province of Salerno in the Campania region of south-western Italy.

== Geography ==
The municipality borders with Buonabitacolo, Monte San Giacomo, Padula, Sala Consilina, Sanza and Teggiano. Its frazioni are Caiazzano, Peglio, San Rocco, Santa Maria, Silla and Varco Notar Ercole.

== Prehistory ==
The area is the only known inland site in Italy with a significant quantity of Mycenean pottery.

== See also ==
- The Sassano Project
- Vallo di Diano
