= Sant'Arsenio =

- Comune
- Comune di Sant'Arsenio
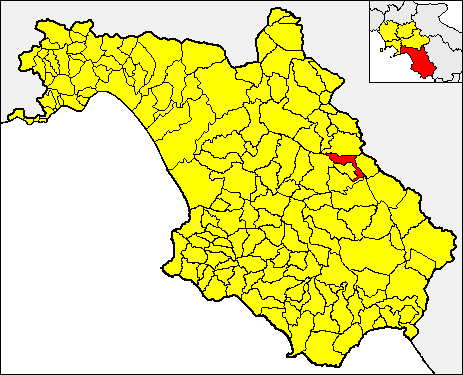
- Sant'Arsenio within the Province of Salerno

- Location within Italy Location within Campania
- Coordinates: 40°28′14″N 15°28′59″E
- Country: Italy
- Region: Campania
- Province: Province of Salerno (SA)

Area
  - Total: 20 km^{2} (7.7 sq mi)
- Elevation: 448 m (1,470 ft)

Population (June 2006)
  - Total: 2,714
  - Density: 140/km^{2} (350/sq mi)
- Demonym: Santarsenesi
- Time zone: UTC+1 (CET)
  - Summer (DST): UTC+2 (CEST)
- Postal code: 84037
- Dialing code: 0975
- Patron saint: Sant'Arsenio
- Saint day: 19 Luglio
- Website: Official website

Sant'Arsenio is a town and comune in the Province of Salerno in the Campania region of south-western Italy, located about 180 km (110 mi) southeast of Naples and about 76 km (47 mi) southeast of Salerno. As of 30 June 2006, it had a population of 2,714 (1,309 men and 1,405 women) and an area of 20 km^{2} (7.7 sq mi).

== Geography ==
Sant'Arsenio borders the following municipalities: Atena Lucana (SA), Corleto Monforte (SA), Polla (SA), San Pietro al Tanagro (SA), San Rufo (SA) and Teggiano (SA).

== Demographic evolution ==
Historical population

| Year | Pop. | ±% |
|---|---|---|
| 1861 | 4,213 | — |
| 1871 | 4,366 | +3.6% |
| 1881 | 3,749 | −14.1% |
| 1901 | 3,321 | −11.4% |
| 1911 | 3,253 | −2.0% |

| Year | Pop. | ±% |
|---|---|---|
| 1921 | 3,274 | +0.6% |
| 1931 | 3,343 | +2.1% |
| 1936 | 3,535 | +5.7% |
| 1951 | 3,461 | −2.1% |
| 1961 | 3,081 | −11.0% |

| Year | Pop. | ±% |
|---|---|---|
| 1971 | 3,027 | −1.8% |
| 1981 | 3,252 | +7.4% |
| 1991 | 3,099 | −4.7% |
| 2001 | 2,752 | −11.2% |

Source: Data from ISTAT

== See also ==
- Vallo di Diano
- Alburni
