= Casalbuono =

- Comune
- Comune di Casalbuono
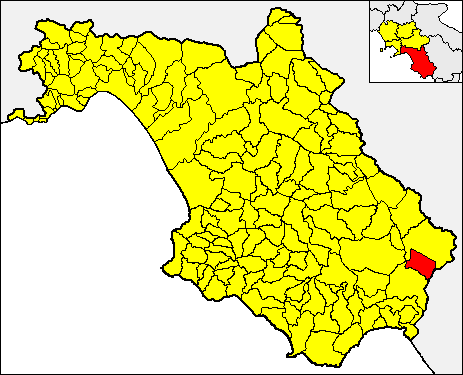
- Casalbuono within the Province of Salerno

- Location within Italy Location within Campania
- Coordinates: 40°12′N 15°41′E
- Country: Italy
- Region: Campania
- Province: Salerno (SA)

Government
  - Mayor: Attilio Romano

Area
  - Total: 34.82 km^{2} (13.44 sq mi)
- Elevation: 661 m (2,169 ft)

Population (28 February 2017)
  - Total: 1,174
  - Density: 33.72/km^{2} (87.32/sq mi)
- Demonym: Casalbuonesi
- Time zone: UTC+1 (CET)
  - Summer (DST): UTC+2 (CEST)
- Postal code: 84030
- Dialing code: 0975
- ISTAT code: 065026
- Website: Official website

Casalbuono is a town and comune in the province of Salerno in the Campania region of south-western Italy.

== Geography ==
The municipality borders with Casaletto Spartano, Lagonegro, Montesano sulla Marcellana and Sanza.

== See also ==
- Vallo di Diano
