= Teggiano =

Teggiano Rianu (Neapolitan)
- Comune
- Città di Teggiano
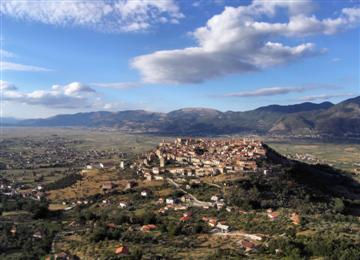
- Panoramic View

- Location within Italy Location within Campania
- Coordinates: 40°23′N 15°32′E
- Country: Italy
- Region: Campania
- Province: Province of Salerno (SA)
- Frazioni: Facofano, Macchiaroli, Pantano, Piedimonte, Prato Perillo, San Marco

Government
  - Mayor: Michele Di Candia (since June 06,2016)

Area
  - Total: 61.87 km^{2} (23.89 sq mi)
- Elevation: 637 m (2,090 ft)

Population (31 December 2017)
  - Total: 7,794
  - Density: 126.0/km^{2} (326.3/sq mi)
- Demonym: Teggianesi
- Time zone: UTC+1 (CET)
  - Summer (DST): UTC+2 (CEST)
- Postal code: 84039
- Dialing code: 0975
- Patron saint: Saint Conus
- Saint day: 3 June
- Website: Official website

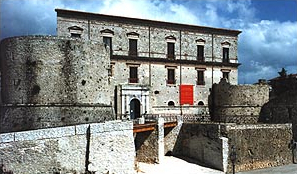
Castle of Teggiano.

Teggiano (Teggianese: Rianu), formerly Diano, is a town and comune (municipality) in the province of Salerno, Campania, Italy. It is situated on an isolated eminence above the upper part of the valley to which it gives the name of Vallo di Diano.

Among the historic centers of the province, Teggiano is certainly one that has best preserved its ancient appearance of the fortress and it is this aspect which is shown to those who reach the old town. The appearance of a Roman oppidum, still now remembered by the well preserved plan of the Cardo and of the Decumanus, was renewed in the Norman period and in the age of Frederick II of Hohenstaufen.

== History ==
Tegianum was built by Lucanians early in the 4th century BC, and later was a municipal town of Lucania. There was Gracchan colonization in the 2nd century BCE, and a larger colonization program under Nero.

During the Middle Ages Diano had a predominant role in the history of the Vallo di Diano. In Norman times, the Sanseverino family, counts of Marsico and later princes of Salerno, took over the fief of Diano, which was composed of the hamlets of Sassano, Monte San Giacomo, San Rufo, San Pietro al Tanagro and Sant'Arsenio. Teggiano was ruled by the Sanseverino for over three centuries (1239–1556). They chose the castle as a stronghold in which they could take shelter during emergencies. At that time Diano was surrounded by high walls with 25 guard towers and four gates. In 1497, under Antonello Sanseverino of Salerno, the city resisted the siege undertaken by Frederick IV of Naples for 8 months. Following a new rebellion, led this time by Ferrante, last Prince of Salerno, in 1552 the Sanseverino family was expelled from the kingdom. Teggiano became a fief of other noble families including the Gomez da Silva, the Grimaldi, the Caracciolo, the Villani, the Colonna, the Calà and Schipani.

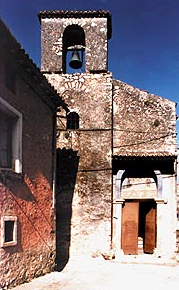
St. Antuono church.

In 1564, after the Council of Trent, Bishop Paolo Varallo instituted in Diano one of the first seminaries in Italy, completed in 1601. On July 17, 1586 Pope Sixtus V gave the right to establish the residence in Diano, in the actual see, to Bishop Lelio Morello, giving to Diano Episcopalian prerogatives and raised in the meanwhile the church of S. Maria Maggiore to the honor of Cathedral. The action of the Counter-Reformation and the presence of high offices brought in the later centuries a radical remaking of the Romano-Gothic churches in Baroque style.

Two major earthquakes concerned Teggiano's territory: the Neapolitan earthquake that occurred on December 16, 1857 (estimated of magnitude 6.9 on the Richter Scale), and the Irpininan earthquake on November 23, 1980 (measuring 6.89 on the Richter Scale).

== Main sights ==
Ruins of the ancient city can be traced at the foot of the hill; a Roman bridge is also present. Other landmarks are:

- The Sanseverino Castle, built in Norman times. In the early years of the 15th century the country of Diano was forfeited by the Neapolitan Crown due to the expulsion of its feudal lords, the Sanseverino; then the King Ladislaus of Durazzo had the castle restored, ordering that every village in the Vallo di Diano contributed to the expenses. Another restoration was performed in 1417, commissioned this time by the Sanseverino family.
- Church and Convent of Saint Francis of Assisi. Its construction dates back to the earliest years of the 14th century, as attested by the inscription placed on the portal, dated 1307. The Convent is considered, around 1340, belonging to the custodia di Principatus of the Order of Friars Minor. The Convent was suppressed in 1808 by the Napoleonic laws. The plan has a "barn"-like layout, very widespread in the constructions of the Order in the Italian southern area: a rectangular room, covered with a roof hut with a square apse once crowned by a cross vault. In 1745 a false ceiling, painted by De Martino, hid the trusses and the single-lancet windows located to the upper side walls. Frescoes in the convent include Scenes from the life of St. Francis, executed by an unknown master in the first half of the 14th century, and a Franciscan Saints and St. Michael Archangel from the second half of the 15th century. Other features include the 16th century's choir, as well as the cloister with a central well.
- St. Antuono church, probably built before the 11th century, and located on the north side of the old town not far from the walls of the Castle. The exterior, with modest structural lines, shows the steeple built in the thick of the facade: on the right side is placed on the portal the architrave decorated with a delicate interweaving arboreal. The interior has a basilica layout: a small main aisle once flanked by two aisles divided by a shrunk colonnade. Part of the right nave was demolished in 1958 to make room for the road. In recent restoration works have emerged on the walls inside an important cycle of medieval frescoes.

== Twin towns ==
- San Mauro Pascoli, Italy, since 1971
- Toledo, Spain

== See also ==
- Vallo di Diano
- San Cono da Teggiano

== Sources ==
- "Tegianum H. Kathryn Lomas".
