= Atena Lucana =

- Comune
- Comune di Atena Lucana
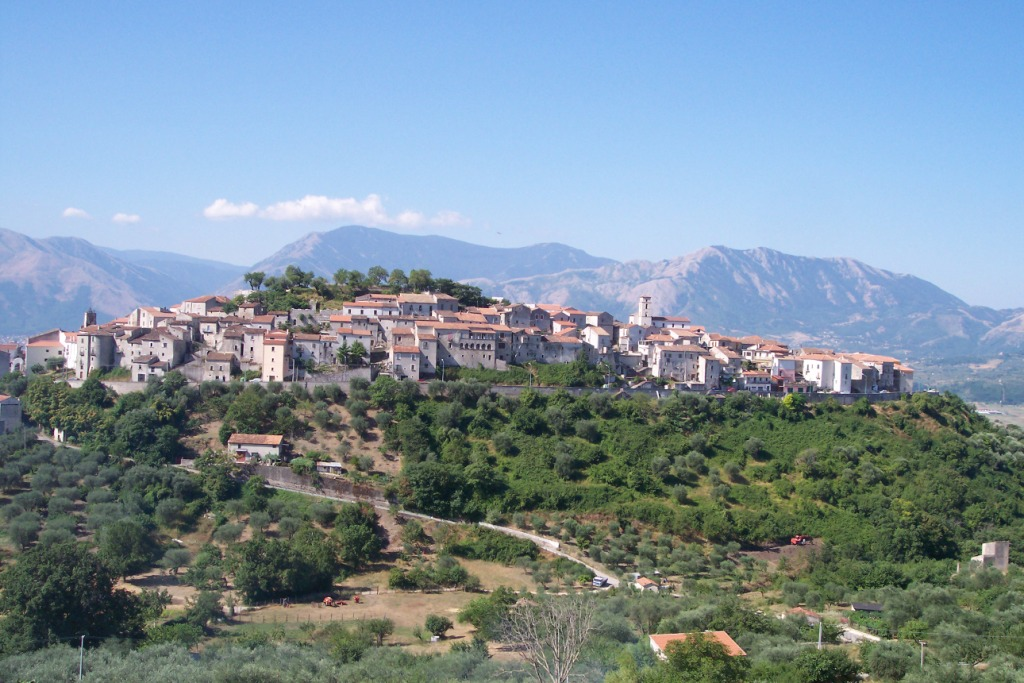

- Coat of arms

- Location of Atena Lucana in Italy Atena Lucana (Campania)
- Coordinates: 40°27′N 15°33′E
- Country: Italy
- Region: Campania
- Province: Salerno (SA)
- Frazioni: Atena Lucana Scalo, San Giuseppe, Serrone

Government
  - Mayor: Luigi Vertucci

Area
  - Total: 26.01 km^{2} (10.04 sq mi)
- Elevation: 642 m (2,106 ft)

Population (28 February 2017)
  - Total: 2,368
  - Density: 91.04/km^{2} (235.8/sq mi)
- Demonym: Atinati or Atenesi
- Time zone: UTC+1 (CET)
  - Summer (DST): UTC+2 (CEST)
- Postal code: 84030
- Dialing code: 0975
- ISTAT code: 065010
- Patron saint: St. Blaise
- Website: Official website

Atena Lucana is a town and comune in the province of Salerno in the Campania region of south-western Italy.

== History ==
Atena Lucana is one of the most ancient settlements in the Vallo di Diano, as testified by the presence of prehistoric Megalithic walls. Later it was a fortress of the Lucani and a municipium of the Romans. In imperial times it temples dedicated to Jupiter, Cybele, Aesculapius, Hercules, bath, an amphitheatre and, perhaps, a forum.

Around the 9th century it was destroyed by Saracen raiders. Subsequently, it was a fief of different baronial families. In the 19th century much of the population emigrated to North and South America.

== Main sights ==
- Church of St. Nicholas (9th century)
- Church of Santa Maria Maggiore
- Archaeological area of Serrone
- Castle
- Megalithic Walls (4th century BC)

== Festivals ==
A popular feast day in Atena Lucana is the feast of San Ciro, which is celebrated the 3rd Sunday of May. The women, to show their devotion carry large pyramids of candles on their heads in a procession. Many of them go barefoot as well to show their devotion or to ask for a healing from the Saint.

== Twin towns ==
- Meliki, Greece

== See also ==
- Vallo di Diano
