= Buonabitacolo =

- Comune
- Comune di Buonabitacolo
- Coat of arms

- Location within Italy Location within Campania
- Coordinates: 40°16′N 15°37′E
- Country: Italy
- Region: Campania
- Province: Salerno (SA)

Government
  - Mayor: Giancarlo Guercio

Area
  - Total: 15.54 km^{2} (6.00 sq mi)
- Elevation: 501 m (1,644 ft)

Population (28 February 2017)
  - Total: 2,546
  - Density: 163.8/km^{2} (424.3/sq mi)
- Demonym: Buonabitacolesi
- Time zone: UTC+1 (CET)
  - Summer (DST): UTC+2 (CEST)
- Postal code: 84032
- Dialing code: 0975
- ISTAT code: 065018
- Patron saint: St. Elijah
- Website: Official website

Buonabitacolo is a town and comune in the province of Salerno in the Campania region of south-western Italy.

== See also ==
- Vallo di Diano
