= San Severino, Centola =

San Severino
- Frazione
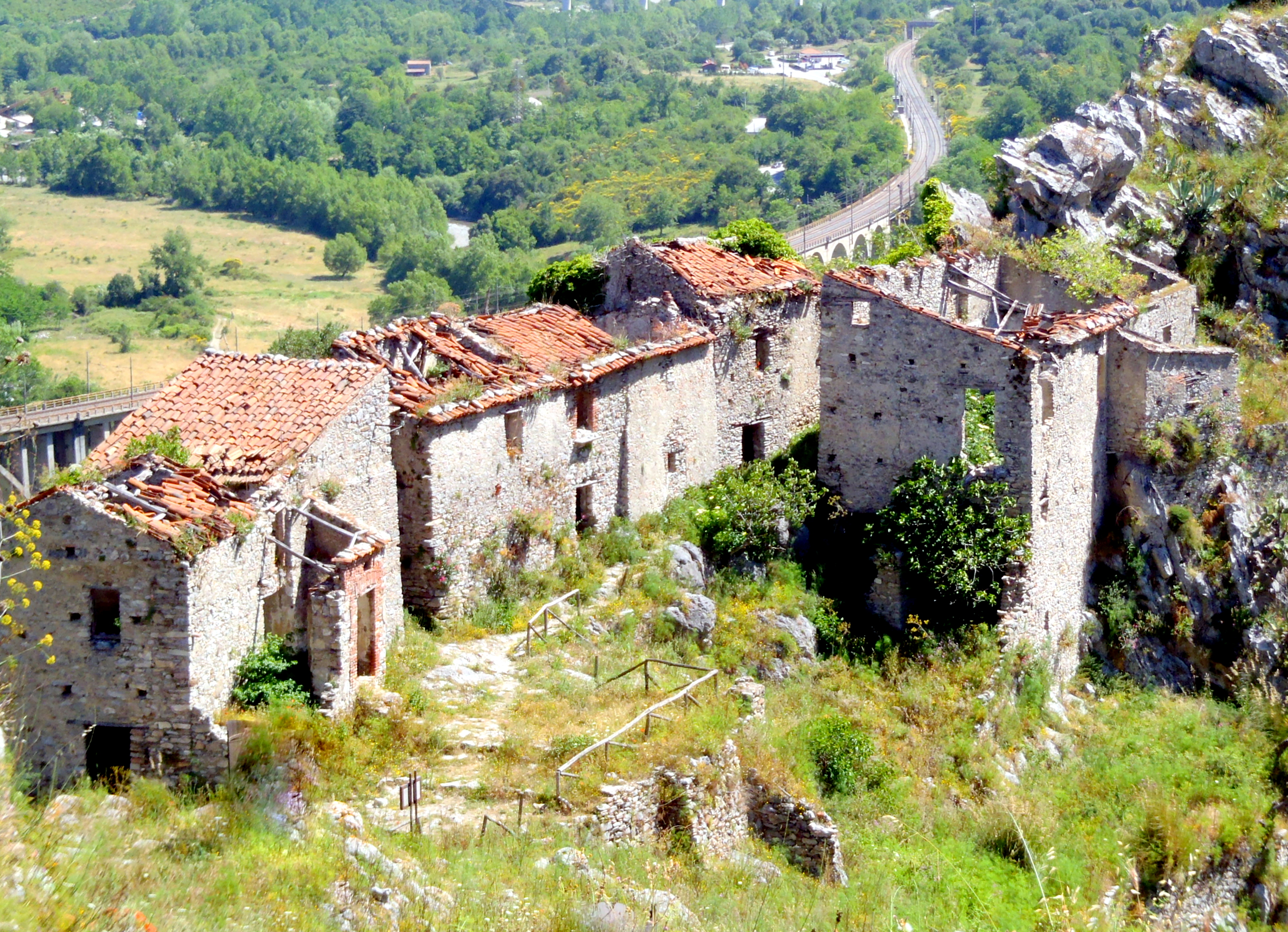
- Medieval village upon the hill. In the background the railway bridge. 2012 photo

- Location of San Severino in Italy
- Coordinates: 40°5′23.28″N 15°20′51″E
- Country: Italy
- Region: Campania
- Province: Salerno (SA)
- Comune: Centola
- Elevation: 130 m (430 ft)

Population (2011)
  - Total: 435
- Demonym: Sanseverinesi
- Time zone: UTC+1 (CET)
  - Summer (DST): UTC+2 (CEST)
- Postal code: 84051
- Dialing code: (+39) 0974

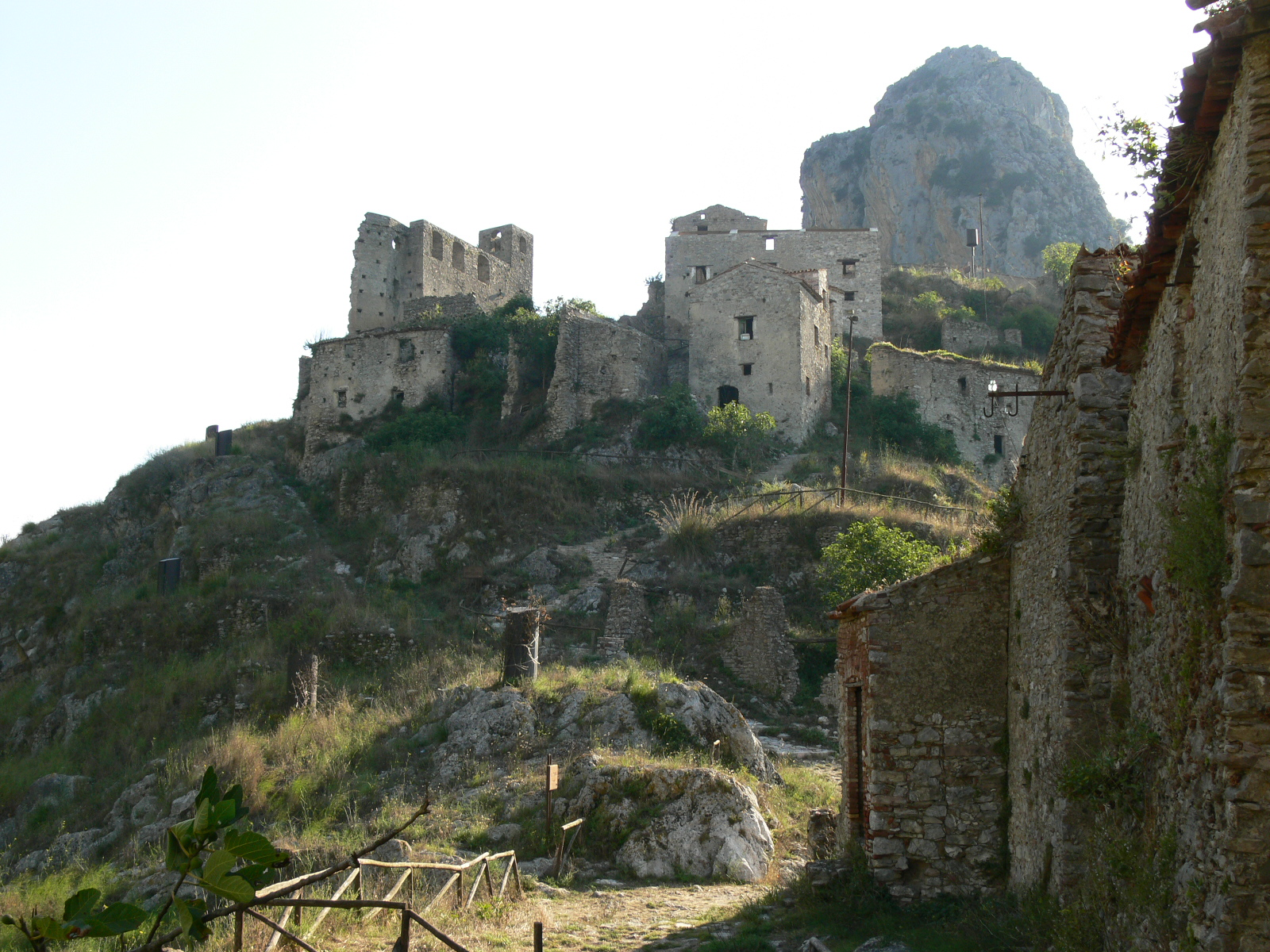
View of the medieval village in 2009.

San Severino is an Italian village and hamlet (frazione) of the municipality of Centola in the Province of Salerno, Campania. As of 2011 its population was 435.

== History ==
The village was founded in the 10th-11th century. Until 1861, it was known as San Severino di Camerota. The original settlement is located upon a hill but was gradually abandoned during the end of the 19th century after the construction of a railway line. New houses were built in the valley, just below the hill but closer to the railway. Nowadays, the ancient village is a ghost town and a preserved heritage, because of the conservation status of its medieval structure.

== Geography ==
Located in the valley of Mingardo river, close to the mount Bulgheria, San Severino is found along the provincial road SP 109, in southern Cilento. It is 4 km far from Foria and Poderia, 6 from Celle di Bulgheria, 8 from Centola, 10 from Palinuro (by the sea), 15 from Camerota and 16 from Marina di Camerota. The modern village is linked to the medieval one by a pedestrian trail.

== Transport ==
In San Severino, there is a railway station of Centola which is part of the Salerno-Reggio Calabria line, linking the village to direct trains to Naples and Cosenza.

The village is also served by a highway (Salerno-Battipaglia-Paestum-Agropoli-Vallo della Lucania-Policastro-Sapri), at the exit of "Poderia-Palinuro", 2,5 km far.

== See also ==
- Cilentan dialect
- Cilentan Coast
- Cilento and Vallo di Diano National Park
