= Capo Palinuro Lighthouse =

Lighthouse in Campania, Italy

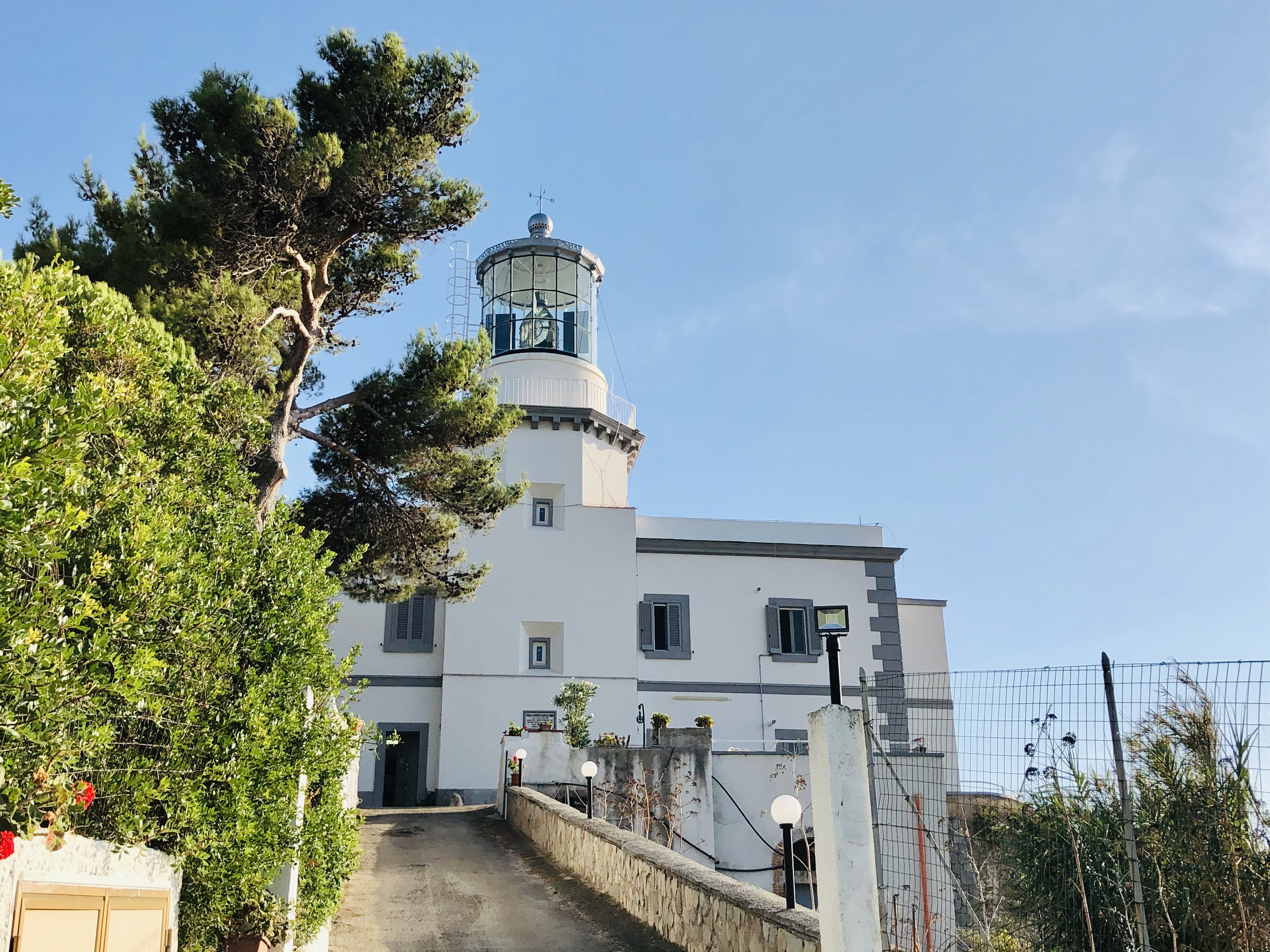
- A view of Capo Palinuro with the lighthouse on the top
- Location: Capo Palinuro; Palinuro; Campania; Italy
- Coordinates: 40°01′28″N 15°16′27″E

Tower
- Constructed: 1870
- Construction: masonry tower
- Height: 14 metres (46 ft)
- Shape: octagonal prism tower with balcony and lantern atop a 2-storey keeper’s house
- Markings: white tower
- Power source: mains electricity
- Operator: Parco Nazionale del Cilento, Vallo di Diano e Alburni

Light
- Focal height: 206 metres (676 ft)
- Lens: Type OR 500; Focal length: 250 mm
- Intensity: AL 1000 W
- Range: main: 25 nautical miles (46 km; 29 mi) reserve: 18 nautical miles (33 km; 21 mi)
- Characteristic: Fl (3) W 15s.
- Italy no.: 2668 E.F.

Capo Palinuro Lighthouse (Italian: Faro di Capo Palinuro) is an active lighthouse located in the south-western Italy, roughly 40 miles (64 km) south-west of Salerno, in the southern part of Cilento.

== Description ==
The lighthouse was built in 1870 and consists of a white octagonal prism tower, 14 feet (4.3 m) high, with balcony and lantern, rising from a 2-storey white keeper's house. The lantern, painted in grey metallic, is positioned at 206 metres (676 ft) above sea level and emits three white flashes in a 15 seconds period, visible up to a distance of 25 nautical miles (46 km; 29 mi). The lighthouse is completely automated, powered by a solar unit and is operated by the Marina Militare with the identification code number 2668 E.F.

== See also ==
- List of lighthouses in Italy
- Cape Palinuro
