= Caves of Marina di Camerota =

Caves in Italy

- Grotte di Marina di Camerota
- Location within Italy
- Location: Marina di Camerota, Salerno, Campania, Italy
- Coordinates: 40.0033°N 15.3772°E
- Length: Coastal stretch approx. 10 km
- Discovery: 1950s (archaeological excavations)
- Geology: Karstic coastal and inland caves
- Access: By land and by sea
- Show cave opened: Yes (guided tours available)
- Features: Prehistoric occupation from the Late Middle Palaeolithic to the Chalcolithic period; within the Cilento, Vallo di Diano and Alburni National Park

The Caves of Marina di Camerota (Grotte di Marina di Camerota) are a series of coastal and inland caves located in Marina di Camerota, along the Cilento Coast in Campania, Italy. This site includes a group of prehistoric caves of archaeological and speleological interest. Excavations conducted since the 1950s have identified evidence of human presence from the late Middle Palaeolithic to the Chalcolithic period, documenting successive phases of prehistoric human presence along the southern Tyrrhenian coast.

== Location ==
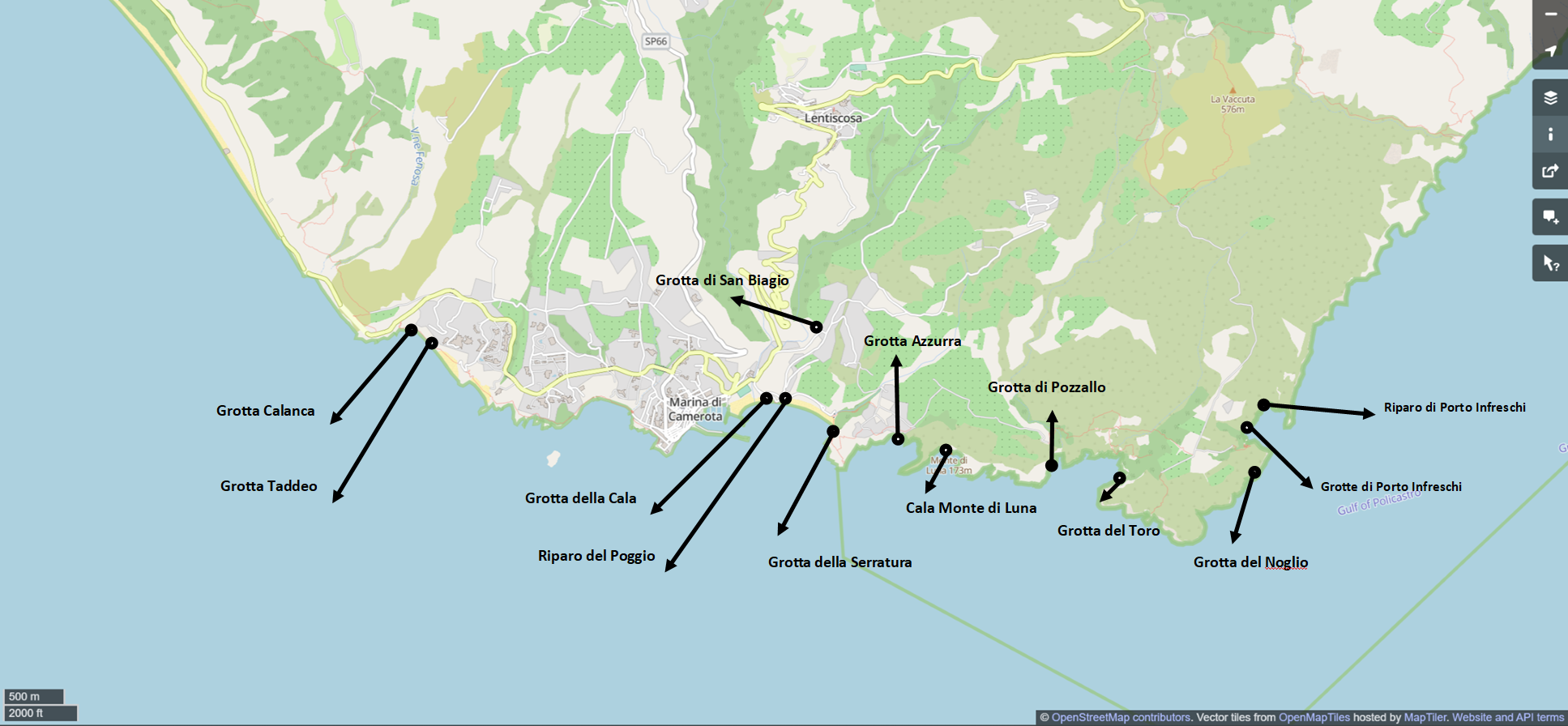
"© OpenStreetMap contributors - data is available under the Open Database License"

The caves are located along the Cilento coast in southern Campania, Italy, within the Cilento, Vallo di Diano and Alburni National Park, a UNESCO World Heritage Site. They are situated near the village of Marina di Camerota, in the province of Salerno, overlooking the Tyrrhenian Sea.

The site extends for several kilometers between Capo Palinuro and Scario, following a coastline of cliffs, coves, and small inlets. Many of the caves open directly onto the sea or are found just inland among Mediterranean vegetation, with views across the Gulf of Policastro.

The caves are accessible by land via walking paths and by sea, by boat from Marina di Camerota.

== Geology ==
Coastal geomorphological studies conducted in the vicinity of the Baia degli Infreschi area indicate that the Camerota cave system developed in connection with Late Quaternary sea-level fluctuations. The caves were formed through the gradual erosion of Mesozoic limestone through water and marine action over thousands of years. This process created karst features such as small stalactites and flowstones, which indicate alternating dry and wet phases in the area's geological past.

The Mediterranean climate of the area, characterized by mild, rainy winters and hot, dry summers, contributed to the development of the cavities. Seasonal changes in temperature and humidity facilitated processes of limestone dissolution and recrystallization, influencing the formation and modification of internal surfaces. Fluctuations in sea levels and in the circulation of groundwater during the Quaternary glaciation period varied the morphology of the coastal caves. These geological processes produced distinctive natural formations along the coastline.

Karst processes identified along the carbonate slopes of southern Campania include dissolution along fracture systems and the development of overhangs and cavities, some of which are associated with rock-fall scars and collapsed blocks at the base of cliffs. These processes are also observed in the Camerota area and contribute to the present morphology of many coastal and inland caves.

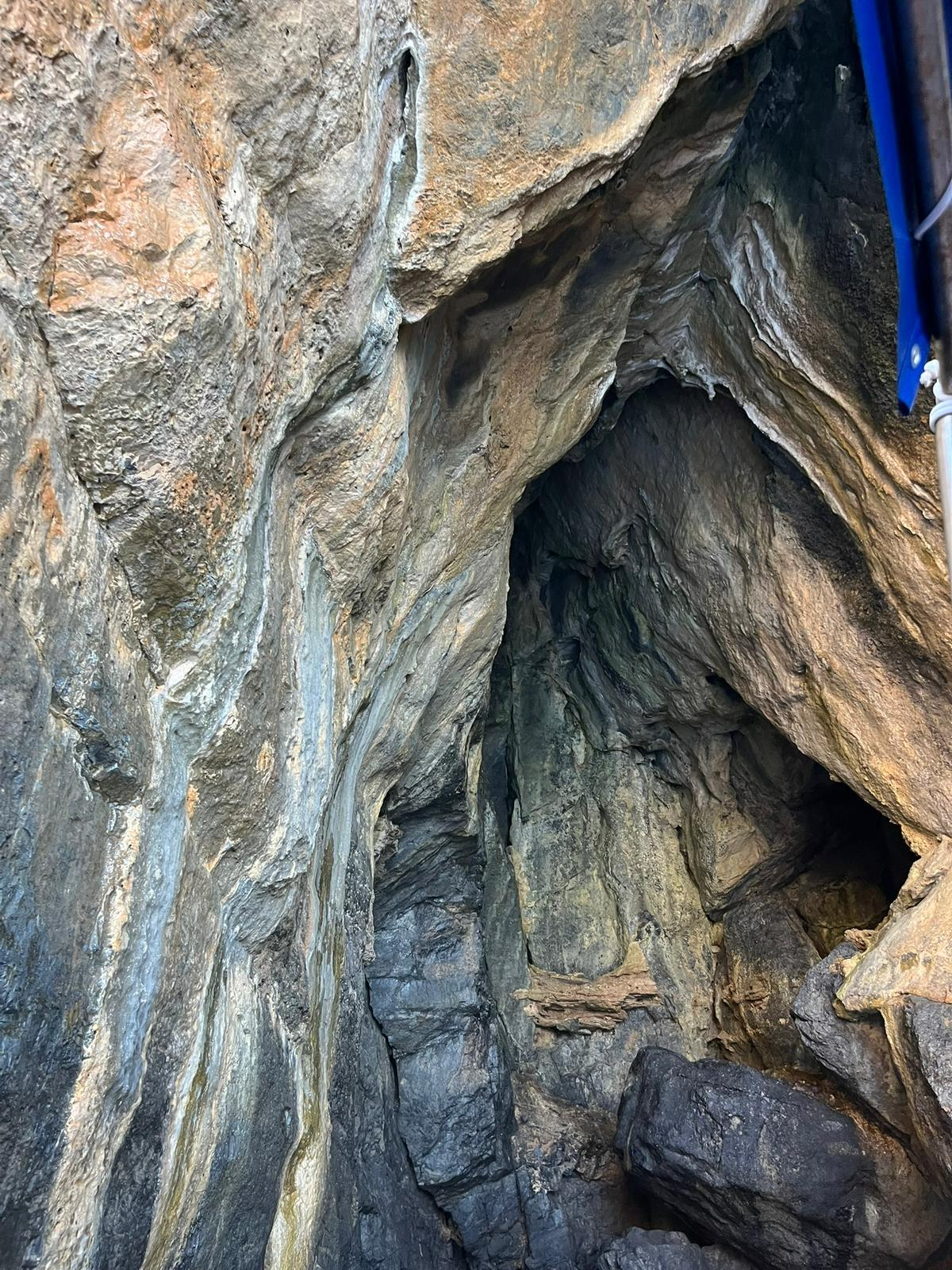
Stratified layers along cave walls, Marina di Camerota, Campania, Italy

Climatic characteristics	Mild, rainy winters and hot, dry summers, with marked seasonal variations in temperature and humidity typical of the Mediterranean climate.
Effect on carbonate rocks	Seasonal changes in moisture and temperature promote limestone dissolution and later recrystallization, influencing the development of karst features.
Impact on cave formation	Repeated cycles of dissolution contribute to the creation and enlargement of cavities, channels and other karst structures.
Formation of mineral deposits	Alternation between humid and dry periods regulates calcite precipitation, leading to the growth of stalactites, stalagmites and flowstones.
Interaction with Quaternary climate fluctuations	Glacial–interglacial cycles affected sea levels and underground water flow, gradually altering the shape of coastal caves.
Role of marine processes	In coastal areas, wave action erodes limestone cliffs and promotes the development of tunnels, cavities and other coastal karst features.

== Prehistoric eras ==
=== Upper Palaeolithic period ===
The caves at Marina di Camerota form a part of a wider group of Late Pleistocene archaeological sites in southern Italy that evidence Neanderthal and early modern human occupations. Archaeological evidence recovered from sites such as Grotta della Cala, Grotta del Poggio and Grotta Taddeo, indicates that this area was frequently occupied by humans throughout the Upper Palaeolithic.

The Upper Palaeolithic stratigraphic succession at Grotta della Cala includes Late Epigravettian layers, underlying levels traditionally attributed to the Early and Evolved Epigravettian periods. These overlay a Gravettian layer resting on Middle Palaeolithic deposits. Excavations in the atrium area have documented Uluzzian, Proto-Aurignacian and Early Gravettian assemblages, giving the Camerota caves one of the most complete Upper Palaeolithic sequences on the Tyrrhenian side of the Italian peninsula.

Radiocarbon dating of these levels places the Gravettian occupations at around 29,000–28,000 calibrated years BP, the Epigravettian levels in the range of roughly 22,000–18,000 cal BP, and the Late Epigravettian layers in the Late Glacial period.

=== Mesolithic period ===
Human occupation in the Mesolithic period is evidenced in Grotta della Cala, where excavations in 2004 found a grindstone used for ochre processing, chipped stone artefacts, and a painted pebble, in addition to the remains of extensive marine animals and medium to large land mammals. Two radiocarbon dates obtained from charcoal in layer 7 (Beta-74162: 8370 ± 80 BP; Beta-123856: 8060 ± 100 BP) calibrate to 7579–7189 BC and 7314–6687 BC.

=== Neolithic period ===
During the Neolithic period Grotta della Cala was used as a habitation and burial site. Excavations have uncovered ceramic vessels, bone fishing hooks, and an infant burial. The Neolithic stratigraphy shows a shift in material culture indicating domestic, ritual and subsistence activities within the cave.

=== Chalcolithic period ===
Marina di Camerota was inhabited by prehistoric communities during the Copper Age or Chalcolithic period, as testified by the finds in caves like Grotta della Cala. Excavations have found ceramic containers and bone hooks from the Chalcolithic period, together with a series of other finds from previous periods in the same cave. Settlement continuity and technological development are manifested in this layer, which includes copper.

== The caves ==
Caves of Marina di Camerota
Name	Size	Coordinates	Accessible	Findings/Peculiarities
Grotta della Cala	27 x 5 meters	40.0011°N 15.3810°E	By sea and land	Mesolithic and Neolithic layers, ochre, stone tools, painted pebble.
Grotta del Poggio	Length: ≈ 23 meters	40.0008°N 15.3818°E	By sea and land	Faunal remains of large mammals and rhinoceros, human remains and lithic artifacts.
Grotta della Serratura	Length: ≈ 77 meters	39.9984°N 15.3866°E	By sea	Human remains, bone tools, decorated shells, hearths.
Cala Monte di Luna	Length: ≈ 94 meters	39.9971°N 15.3976°E	By sea	Natural rock arch.
Grotta di Pozzallo	Length: ≈ 18 meters	39.9958°N 15.4067°E	By sea	Coastal cave with spring.
Grotta di San Biagio	6.5 x 15 meters	40.0053°N 15.3845°E	By land	Small chapel with wall paintings.
Grotta Taddeo	16 x 10 meters	40.0007°N 15.3662°E	By sea	Human teeth, faunal remains, lithic tools.
Grotta del Noglio	8 × 4 meters	39.9947°N 15.4245°E	Not open to public	Evidence of prehistoric activity, possibly used seasonally for fishing.
Grotta del Toro	Length: ≈ 35 meters	39.9952°N 15.4135°E	By sea	Sea cave, named for its shape.
Grotta Azzurra	Length: ≈ 36 meters	39.9980°N 15.3934°E	By sea, occasionally by land	Sea cave, named for its intense blue color.

=== Grotta della Cala ===
Grotta della Cala is one of the most important archaeological caves in Marina di Camerota. Located a few metres from the sea, it consists of front and rear chambers connected by a narrow passage that gives it an hourglass shape. The cave contains traces of Neanderthal occupation, including pebbles and bone tools dating to the Middle Paleolithic. Later, the site was used by Homo sapiens, who left stone tools such as scrapers and blades associated with hunting and food preparation.

Archaeological research has documented a long sequence of prehistoric occupation, including a Mesolithic layer containing a hearth, a grindstone covered with red ochre, a painted pebble, and numerous terrestrial and marine faunal remains. Stone artefacts include side-scrapers, end-scrapers and microliths. Several shells show piercings and traces of ochre, suggesting their use as personal ornaments. Two radiocarbon dates on charcoal from this layer calibrate to 7579–7189 BC and 7314–6687 BC, indicating human activity during the early Holocene period.

Recent work on the lithic assemblage from layer O in the internal series has reassigned this level from the Evolved to the Early Epigravettian period, on the basis of its production schemes and typology. A techno-typological and low-power use-wear study of 41 backed pieces and shouldered points from this layer identified several armatures used as mechanically delivered projectiles, alongside semi-finished pieces and tools used for cutting or piercing. The same study shows that some of the cherts used for these implements are non-local, suggesting contacts between groups on the southern Tyrrhenian and central–southern Adriatic sides of the Italian Peninsula. Faunal remains from layer O are dominated by red deer, with additional wild boar, roe deer, aurochs and caprines, indicating hunting focused on ungulates in largely wooded environments with some open habitats.

The cave contains installations developed by the University of Siena in collaboration with the Superintendence and the management of the Virtual Museum of the Paleolithic of Camerota, including archaeological finds and dioramas in sections of the excavated cave floor, depicting scenes from prehistoric daily life. The cave is open to the public and accessible through guided tours organised by local associations in Marina di Camerota.

=== Grotta del Poggio ===
The Poggio Complex is situated on a spur east of Marina di Camerota. It originally consisted of a large natural cavity, which collapsed during the Pleistocene period due to water erosion to form the current shape, now known as Riparo del Poggio. The site contained substantial evidence of Neanderthal occupation dating to the glacial period of the Middle Paleolithic, with occupation levels dated to between approximately 200,000 and 140,000 years ago.

The principal archaeological remains consist of stone tools, including points, blades, and scrapers, and human remains, specifically a molar and an ankle bone, as well as bones of extinct animals such as elephants (Palaeoloxodon antiquus) and rhinoceroses, some of which exhibit evidence of butchering by early humans.

Ongoing excavations conducted by Italian universities have established Grotta del Poggio as one of the most significant Paleolithic sites in Italy. Since 2022, the site has been included in a European research project focused on Neanderthals and early Homo sapiens.

=== Grotta della Serratura ===
Grotta della Serratura, also known as Grotta della Chiave, is a deep cave situated along Lentischelle beach in Marina di Camerota. The cave's name comes from its distinctive keyhole-shaped opening, which led to its being called 'Serratura' (meaning 'Lock' in Italian).

It is a large archaeological site with evidence of ongoing human activity and settlement during both the Paleolithic and Neolithic periods. The site has been partly eroded by the sea, with the best preserved deposits occurring 50 meters from the entrance where erosion has been minimal.

Excavations have uncovered evidence of Neolithic human activity, including isolated human remains, bone tools, decorated shells, and numerous hearths indicating the controlled use of fire. Painted pebbles adorned with red ochre have been found, suggesting symbolic or ritual practices.

Faunal remains within the cave indicate a broad subsistence strategy, with the consumption of terrestrial animals, birds, mollusks, and marine fish such as eels, Sparus aurata (orata), and Pagellus (pagello).

=== Grotta del Noglio ===
Grotta del Noglio is a small coastal cave situated east of Marina di Camerota, near Porto Infreschi. The entrance is about three meters above sea level and faces the Tyrrhenian Sea. Archaeological surveys indicate possible evidence of prehistoric use, suggesting that the site may have served as a temporary shelter or fishing station during the Late Stone Age.

Local accounts and geomorphological studies characterize the cave as part of a broader network of small karst cavities generated by marine erosion of Mesozoic limestone. The cavity measures approximately 8 by 4 meters and is designated as a coastal karst feature. The cave is not accessible to the public due to its significant geological and archaeological preservation and its position within the Cilento and Vallo di Diano National Park,

=== Cala Monte di Luna ===
Cala Monte di Luna is a coastal rock formation west of Marina di Camerota. The cliff forms a semicircular wall resembling a large cylinder, with an arched opening said to evoke the waning moon. The wall rises approximately 150 metres above sea level, displaying erosion features and coastal vegetation. Three rock stacks stand in front of the arch, a feature locally compared to the sea stacks of Capri.

The site is part of the coastal karst system of the Cilento region and situated within the Cilento and Vallo di Diano National Park. The site forms part of the coastal limestone system of the Cilento region and contains karst caves, erosion features, and coastal vegetation. Local descriptions report that the marine cavities in this sector of the coast were used as shelters and storage spaces in antiquity, including during the Roman period.

=== Grotta di Pozzallo ===
Grotta di Pozzallo is a small coastal cave that opens directly onto the sea near Pozzallo beach. A natural freshwater spring flows near the entrance. The area features rocky cliffs, coastal vegetation, and clear blue water within the cave.

No archaeological excavations have been reported at this cave. It is part of the same coastal karst system as Grotta della Cala and Grotta della Serratura.

=== Grotta di San Biagio ===
Grotta di San Biagio is located at an elevation of approximately 40 meters above sea level, with a vertical extent of 6 meters and a total development of about 15 meters. It is unique from the other caves of Marina di Camerota due to the presence of a chapel carved into the rock.

Inside the chapel is a 16th-century fresco depicting the Madonna and Child, Saint Barbara, Saint Blaise, Saint Anthony, and a penitent woman. According to local tradition, the sanctuary was built by monks between the 10th and 11th centuries, possibly refugees from Byzantine iconoclasm. A legend tells of a woman devoted to Saint Blaise who was saved from a falling boulder after invoking the saint’s name. The site remains an place of local devotion, and a Mass in honor of Saint Blaise is celebrated annually on or around 3 February, his feast day.

The cave is registered in the Elenco Catastale delle Grotte Naturali della Campania.

=== Grotta Taddeo ===
Taddeo Cave, locally known as Grotta di San Taddeo, is situated on La Calanca Beach near the center of Marina di Camerota. The cave is named for its stalactites and stalagmites, which are said to resemble Saint Thaddeus. Local legend tells of a fisherman who, after three days without a catch despite praying to the saint, struck and disfigured the figure with an oar.

The cave opens a few metres above sea level in the limestone cliffs of the Cilento coast. It consists of a small elliptical chamber, approximately 16 × 10 metres in size, with a stratigraphic sequence including a reddish sandy layer that yielded both human and faunal remains. Excavations carried out in 1967, first described by Vigliardi in 1968, revealed a simple stratigraphy with a base of Tyrrhenian sandstone, a reddish sandy archaeological deposit, and an upper speleothem crust, attributed to the Late Pleistocene. Four fossil human teeth were recovered from this layer, associated with a Mousterian lithic assemblage. Subsequent analysis confirmed that three of the teeth, a lower left canine, a right premolar, and a right first molar, belong to Neanderthals, while the fourth displays mixed traits within Neanderthal variation.

The same layer contained faunal remains attributed to hippopotamus, rhinoceros, red deer, roe deer, ibex, wild boar, aurochs, and horse, reflecting a mixed landscape of open grassland and freshwater habitats. The lithic artefacts recovered, including sidescrapers, denticulates, and retouched splinters produced on Levallois flakes, correspond to the Mousterian technocomplex typical of southern Italy during the Late Middle Palaeolithic. Grotta Taddeo is interpreted as a short-term Middle Palaeolithic shelter used by Neanderthal groups for hunting or temporary occupation rather than a permanent settlement.

=== Grotta del Toro ===
Grotta del Toro is a coastal sea cave located along the shoreline of Marina di Camerota. The name derives from a rock formation inside the cave that resembles the head of a bull. The cave opens directly onto the sea and is accessible only by boat, as there is no land entrance.

To date, there are no published archaeological or speleological studies on the site, and it appears to hold primarily geomorphological and scenic interest rather than evidence of prehistoric human activity. The cave has an elevation of -5 meters, a total vertical drop of 7.9 meters, a planimetric development of 35.2 meters.

=== Grotta Azzurra ===
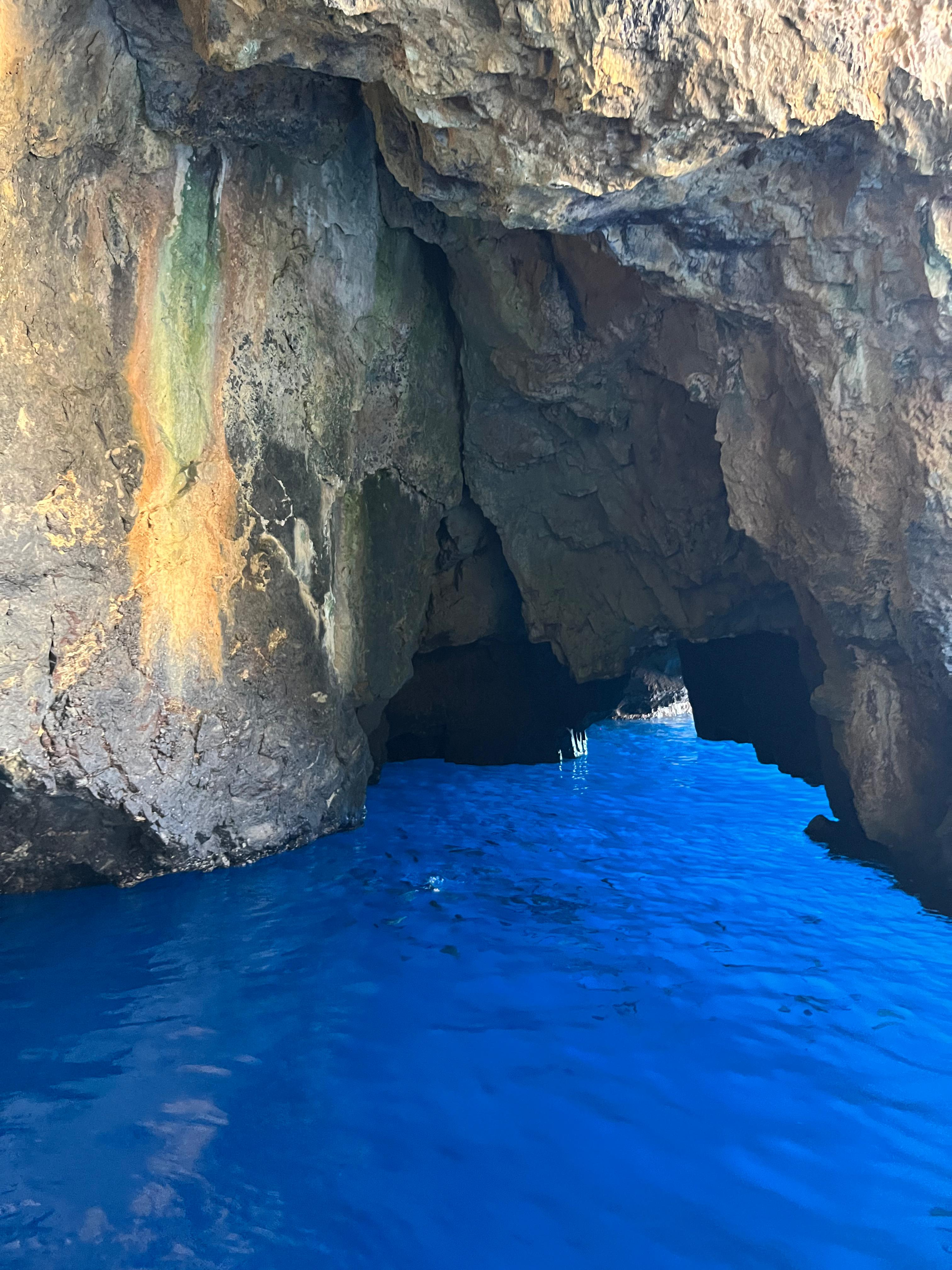
Grotta Azzurra, Campania, Italy

Grotta Azzurra is a sea cave located between Marina di Camerota and Capo Palinuro. Its name refers to the blue reflections created when sunlight enters the chambers and lights up the water. The cave is found in a limestone area prone to dissolution and marine erosion. Inside, it features shaped rock walls, niches, and stalactites or stalagmites within the large cavities connected to the cave itself. It is mainly accessed by boat because the coastal entrance is hard to reach on foot.

The site is a common stop on local boat excursions and is subject to regulations designed to protect the marine environment, including seagrass meadows of Posidonia oceanica grassland.

== Other registered caves in the comune of Camerota ==
The following additional cavities are registered for the comune of Camerota in the Federazione Speleologica Campana Catasto (2022).

- Grotta della Serratura
- Grotta Scura
- Grotta di Mezzanotte
- Grotta del Cimitero
- Grotta del Poggio
- Grotta della Cala
- Grotta I della Calanca
- Grotta II della Calanca
- Grotta della Colonna
- Grotta della Faglia
- Grotta della Cala Longa
- Grotta dei Pipistrelli
- Grotta dell’Acqua
- Grotta del Maggiore
- Grotta degli Infreschi
- Grotta delle Nuglie
- Grotta di Santa Maria
- Grotta dei Due Portali
- Grotta della Cala Fortuna
- Grotta I d’Arconte
- Grotta II d’Arconte
- Grotta III d’Arconte
- Grotta del Pesce
- Grotta di Ponticella
- Grotta I della Cala Finocchiara
- Grotta II della Cala Finocchiara
- Grotta III della Cala Finocchiara
- Grotta IV della Cala Finocchiara
- Grotta I della Cala dei Riccioli
- Grotta II della Cala dei Riccioli
- Grotta III della Cala dei Riccioli
- Grotta I di Torre Muzza
- Grotta II di Torre Muzza
- Grotta III di Torre Muzza
- Grotta IV di Torre Muzza
- Grotta V di Torre Muzza
- Grotta della Cala del Cefalo
- Grotta dell’Autaro
- Grotta II di Piazza Bianca
- Grotta III di Piazza Bianca
- Grotta I dei Morti
- Grotta II dei Morti
- Grotta delle Capre
- Grotta degli Iscolelli
- Grotta di Piedigrotta
- Grotta della Magnosa
- Grotta degli Innamorati
- Grotta di San Biagio
- Grotta di Ponte Sant’Angelo
- Grotta di Torre Zancale
- Grotta il Duomo
- Grotta I del Cannone
- Grotta II del Cannone
- Buco del Trarro
- Grotta Manfrejudice
- Grotta di Galato
- Sorgiva di Punta Infreschi
- Grotta Subacquea di Punta Infreschi
- Tunnel della Magnosa
- Grotta dell’Acqua Dolce
- Passaggio del Masso Incastrato
- La Nicchia
- Occhio di Venere
- Grotta di Acqua Fredda
- Grotta del Tubo
- Grotta dei Rifiuti
- Complesso dei Ceriantus
- Grotta dell’Omo I
- Grotta dell’Omo II
- Grotta dell’Omo III
- Grotta Monte di Luna
- Grotta Architiello
- Grotta del Toro
- Grotta Domenicano
- Grotta delle Noglie Subacquea
- Grotta dei Cannoni
- Grotticella II di Lenticelle
- Grotta VI della Cala Longa
- Grotta di Cala Bianca

== Paleolithic Virtual Museum (MUVIP) ==
The MUVIP, the Virtual Paleolithic Ecomuseum of Marina di Camerota, is a small museum that presents information on the caves of the Camerota coast and their prehistoric occupation through multimedia displays and digital reconstructions. The exhibition includes images, videos and interactive stations illustrating local archaeological research and the Palaeolithic landscape.

The museum contains a section on Camerota’s pottery tradition. It documents the work of local potters, known as cunzari, who continue to produce traditional forms such as the mummuli (two-handled jars for water and wine) and the quartucce (large containers typically carried on the head), using a foot-operated potter's wheel and coil-building techniques.

== Gallery ==
Caves of Marina di Camerota

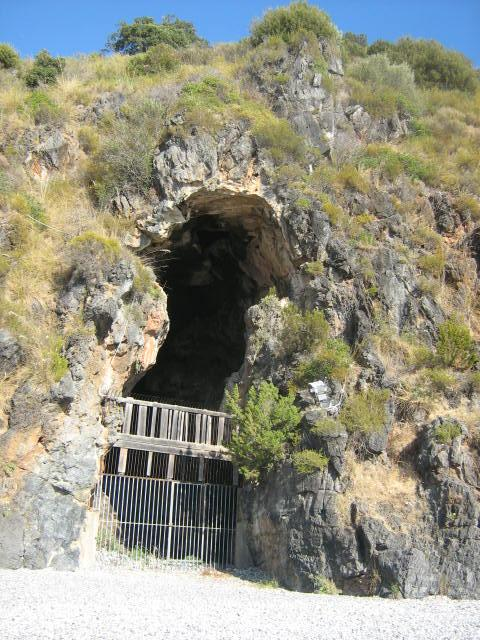
Grotta della Serratura (Lentiscelle Beach), Campania, Italy

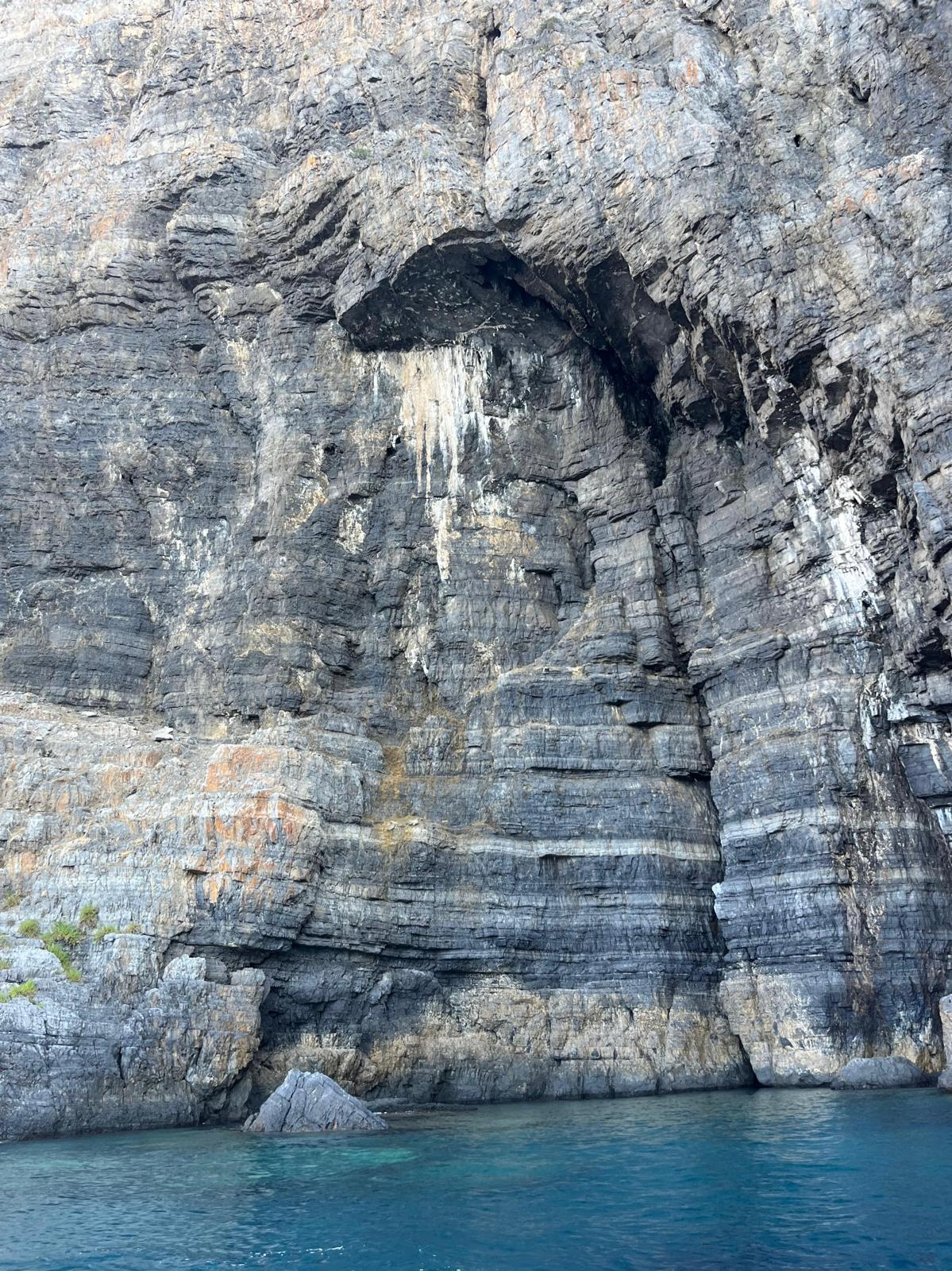
Cala Monte di Luna, Campania, Italy

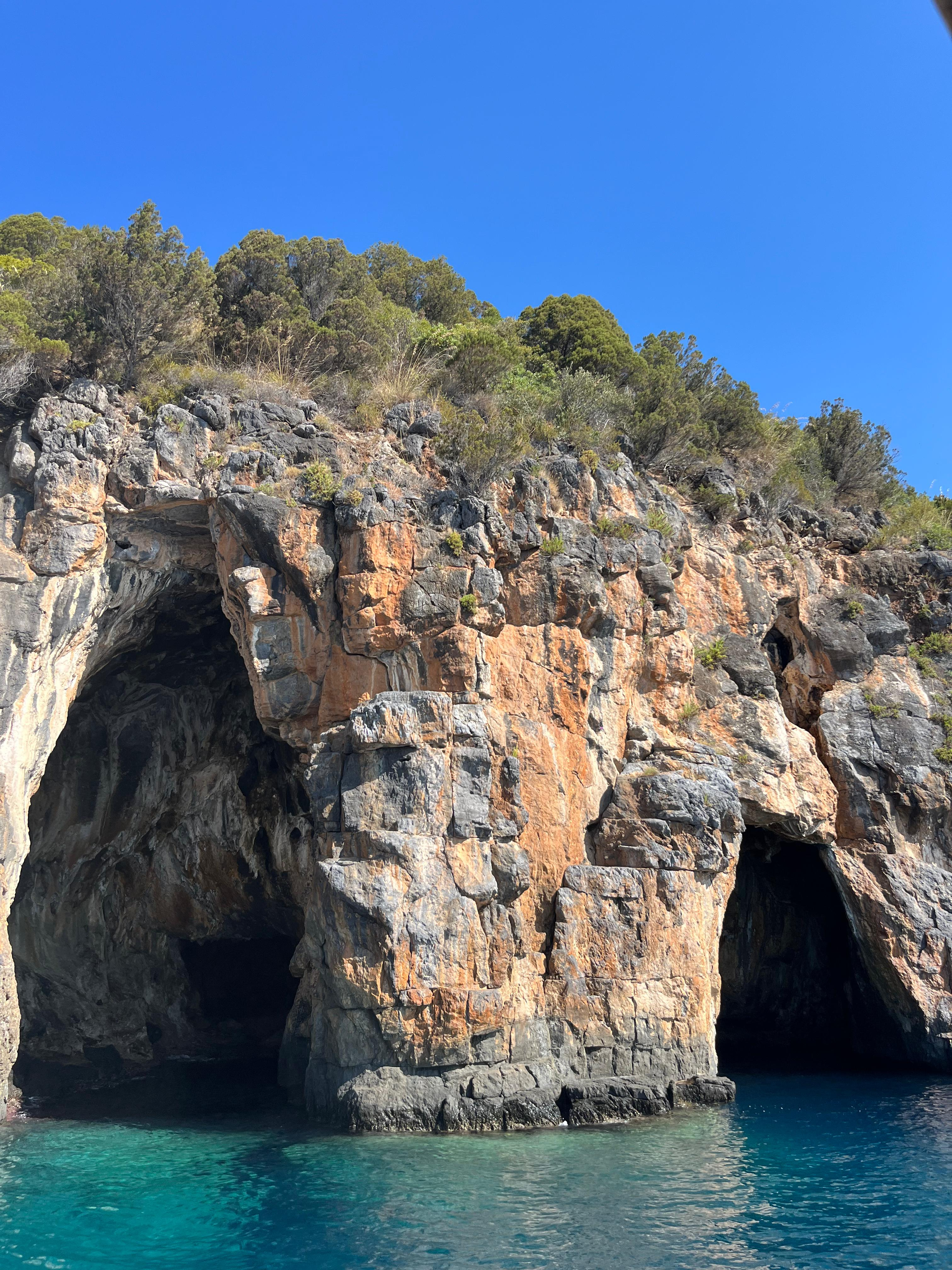
Grotta di Pozzallo (exterior), Campania, Italy

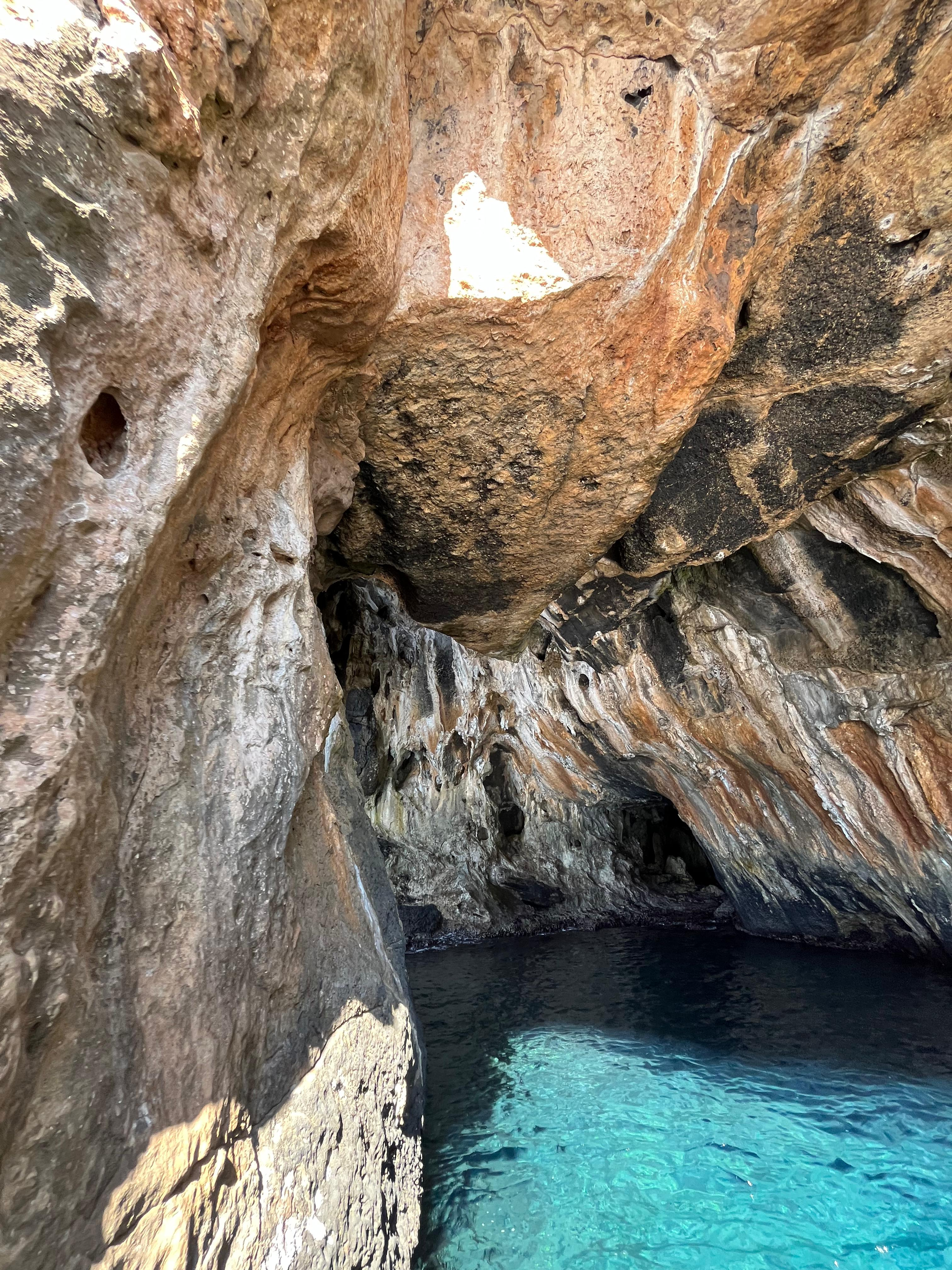
Grotta di Pozzallo (interior view), Campania, Italy

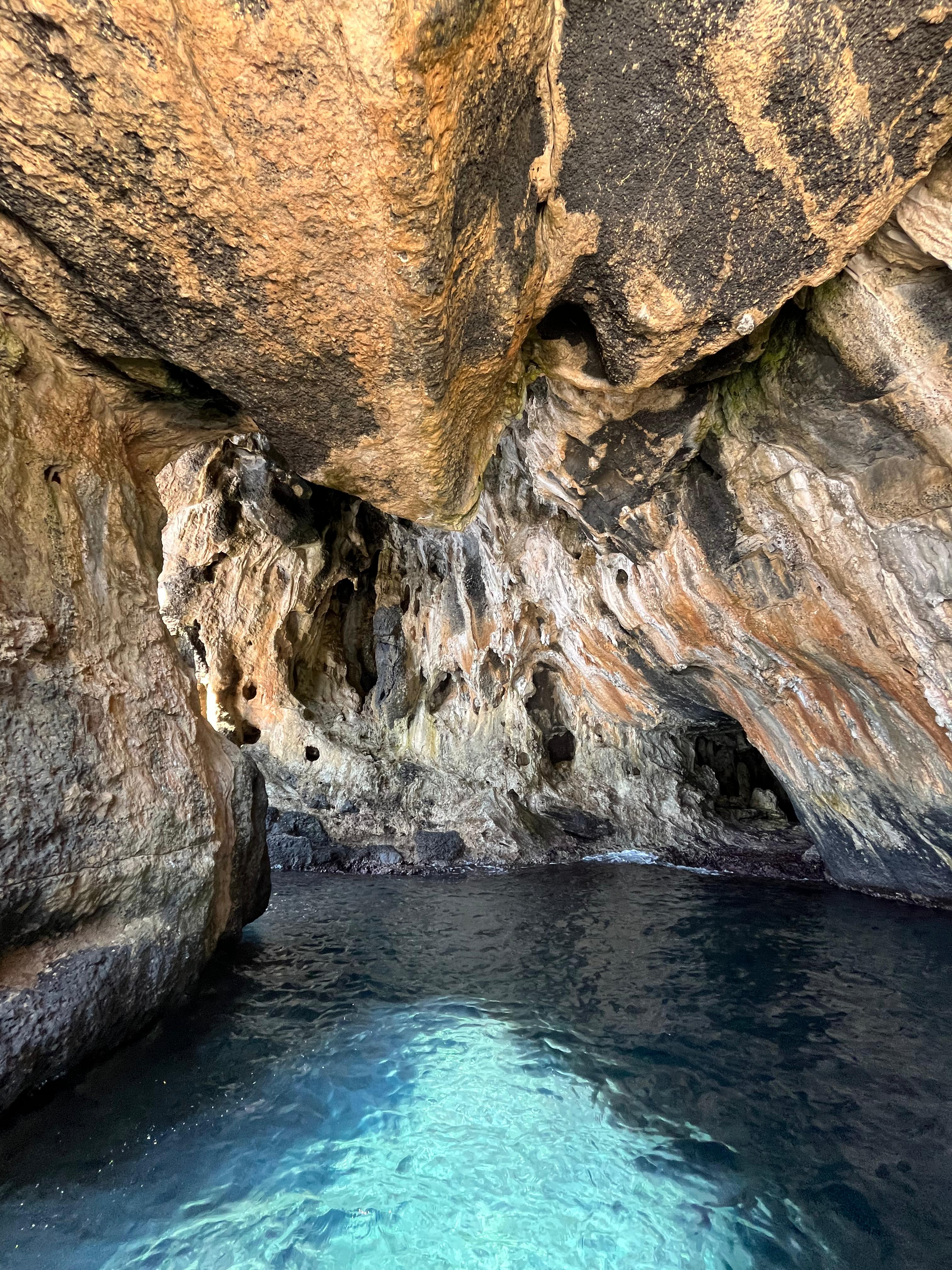
Grotta di Pozzallo (inner chamber), Campania, Italy

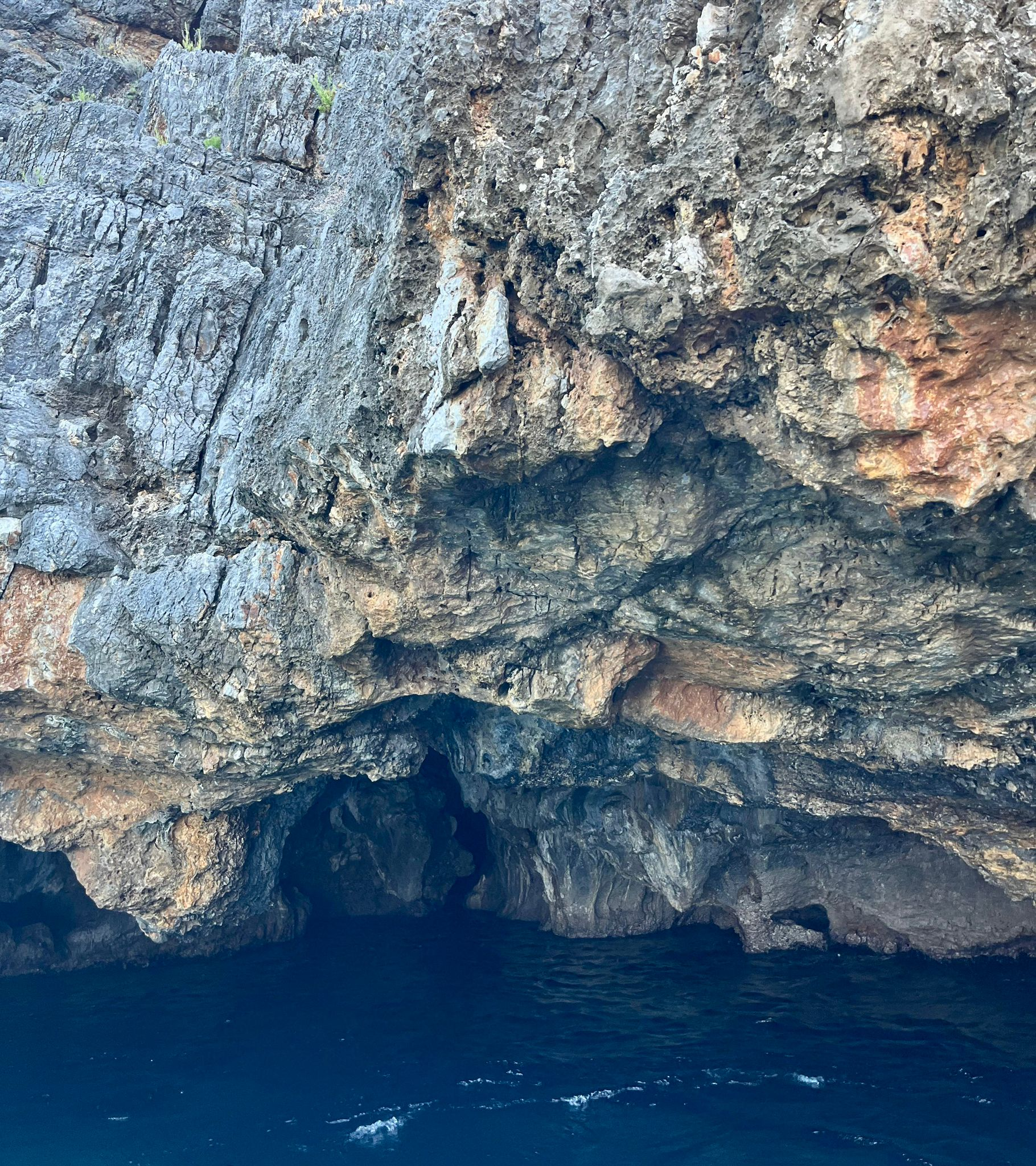
Grotta del Toro, Campania, Italy

== See also ==
- Grotta del Cavallo - a Palaeolithic cave site in southern Italy
- Grotta di Castelcivita - inland Upper Palaeolithic site in Campania
- Grotta Paglicci - Neanderthal site and early modern human remains in Apulia
- Cilento, Vallo di Diano and Alburni National Park - protected area that includes Marina di Camerota
- Prehistoric Italy - overview of human prehistory on the Italian Peninsula
- List of caves in Italy - related national overview
- Paestum - archeological site in the province of Salerno
- Bussento - river in the protected area of Cilento, Vallo di Diano and Alburni National Park
