= Monte Pruno =

Mountain in Italy

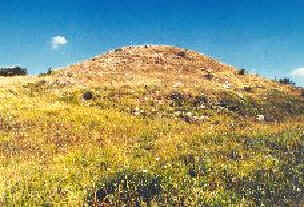

Highest point
- Elevation: 879 m (2,884 ft)
- Coordinates: 40°24′N 15°21′E

Geography
- Location within Italy
- Location: Cilento, Province of Salerno, Campania, Italy
- Parent range: Lucan Apennines, of the Apennine Mountains

Monte Pruno is a mountain in the southern Cilento region of the Province of Salerno, in the Campania region, of southern Italy. It is 879 metres (2,884 ft) above sea level.

== Geography ==
The mountain is in the Lucan Apennines mountain range of the Apennine Mountains system. It is located in the Pruno forest area, in the municipality of Roscigno.

Monte Pruno is protected within Cilento and Vallo di Diano National Park.

The mountain dominates the strategic mountain pass connecting the Vallo di Diano to the surrounding valley networks, acting as a crucial geographic link within the Lucan Apennines.

== History ==
On the mountain outside the town of Roscigno is the archaeological site of Monte Pruno, a settlement of the Oenotrians and the Lucani (7th-3rd centuries BCE).

== See also ==
- Monte Bulgheria
- Monte Stella
