= Roscigno =

- Comune
- Comune di Roscigno
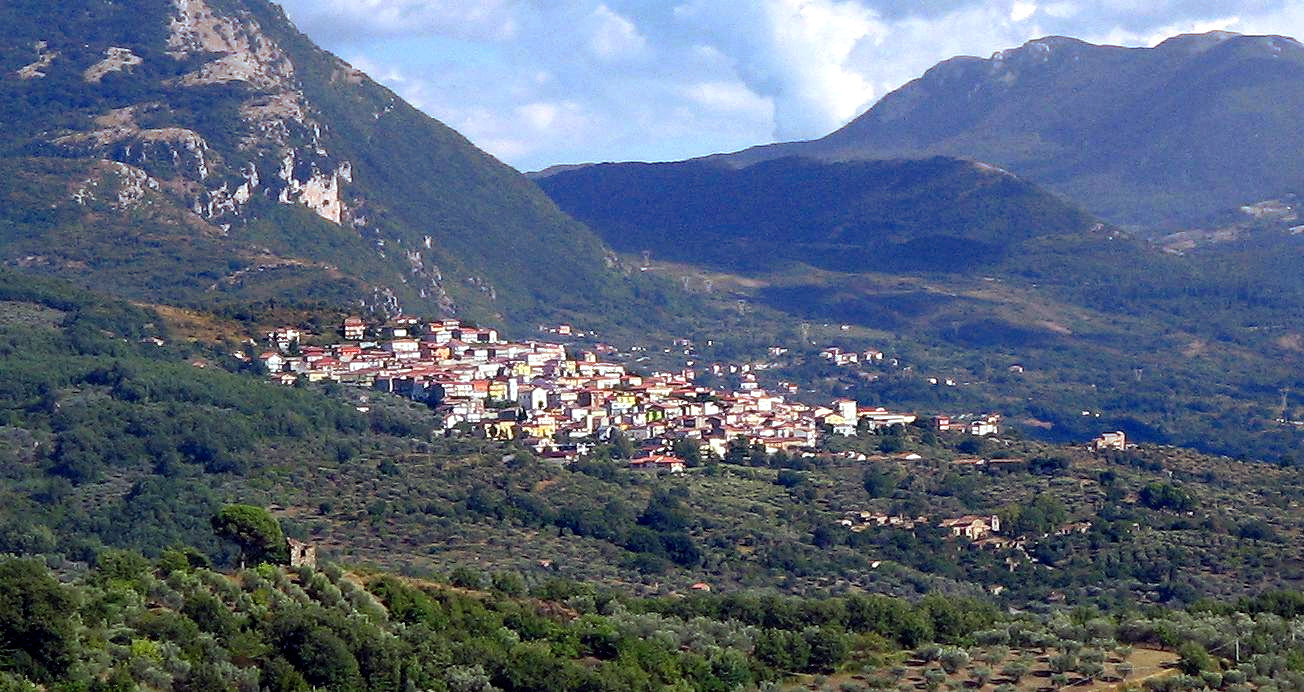
- Panoramic view of Roscigno showing also Roscigno Vecchia (below in the right corner)

- Coat of arms

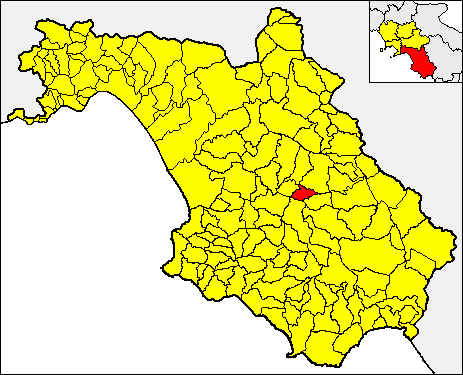
- Roscigno within the Province of Salerno

- Location within Italy Location within Campania
- Coordinates: 40°23′57.89″N 15°20′47.97″E
- Country: Italy
- Region: Campania
- Province: Salerno (SA)

Government
  - Mayor: Pino Palmieri

Area
  - Total: 15.18 km^{2} (5.86 sq mi)
- Elevation: 570 m (1,870 ft)

Population (30 November 2017)
  - Total: 796
  - Density: 52.4/km^{2} (136/sq mi)
- Demonym: Roscignoli
- Time zone: UTC+1 (CET)
  - Summer (DST): UTC+2 (CEST)
- Postal code: 84020
- Dialing code: 0828
- Patron saint: St. Roch
- Saint day: 16 August
- Website: Official website

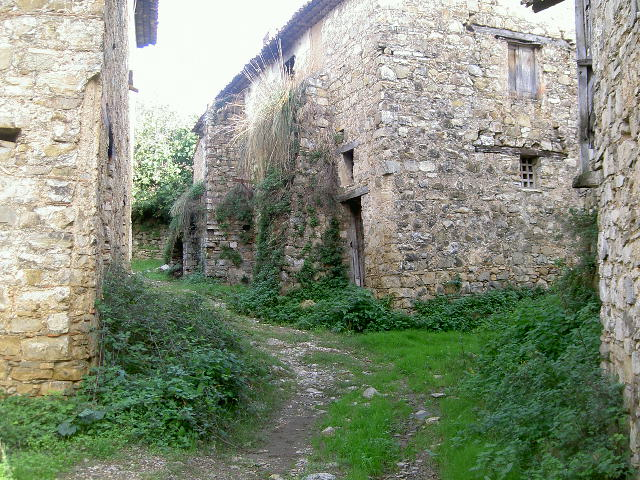
The ruins of Roscigno Vecchia.

The church of Roscigno Vecchia.

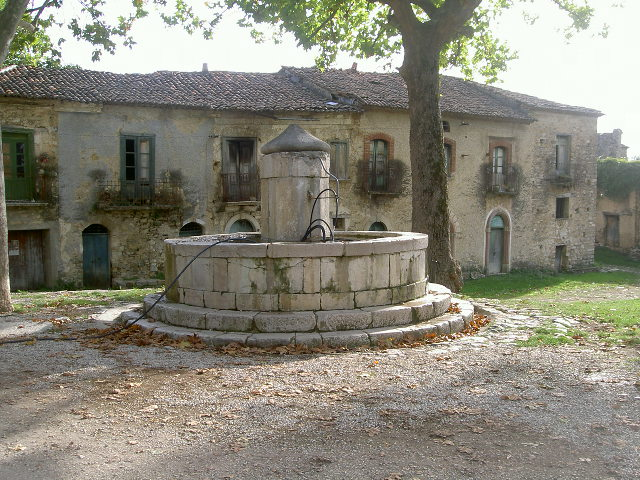
An old palace and the fountain of Roscigno Vecchia.

Roscigno is a small town and comune in Salerno, Campania, Italy. It is located on the slope of Monte Pruno.

== Geography ==
Roscigno is situated in the central area of Cilento. It is within Cilento, Vallo di Diano and Alburni National Park and the Cilento World Heritage Site. The municipality borders with Bellosguardo, Corleto Monforte, Laurino, Sacco and Sant'Angelo a Fasanella.

The town is divided in Roscigno Nuova (New Roscigno, simply referred as Roscigno), the new settlement built after a landslide at the old settlement; now named Roscigno Vecchia (Old Roscigno), distant 1.5 kilometres (0.93 mi) from the "new town".

== Main sights ==
Roscigno Vecchia (Old Roscigno, also named Roscigno Vecchio – 40.401823°N 15.339255°E) is an example of a 19th-century rural town developed around a central square and a church unmodified by modern architectural or infrastructural changes.

It has been completely abandoned since the early 20th century, when the population moved to Roscigno Nuovo due to a landslide. Now open for tourism, the ghost town was declared an eco museum in the early 21st century. Nearby, and also in the province of Salerno, there is another example of ghost town: the old village of Romagnano al Monte.

Some 2 kilometres (1.2 mi) outside the town is the archaeological site on Monte Pruno, a settlement of the Oenotrians and the Lucani (7th-3rd centuries BC).

== See also ==
- Cilentan dialect
