= Camerota =

- Comune
- Comune di Camerota
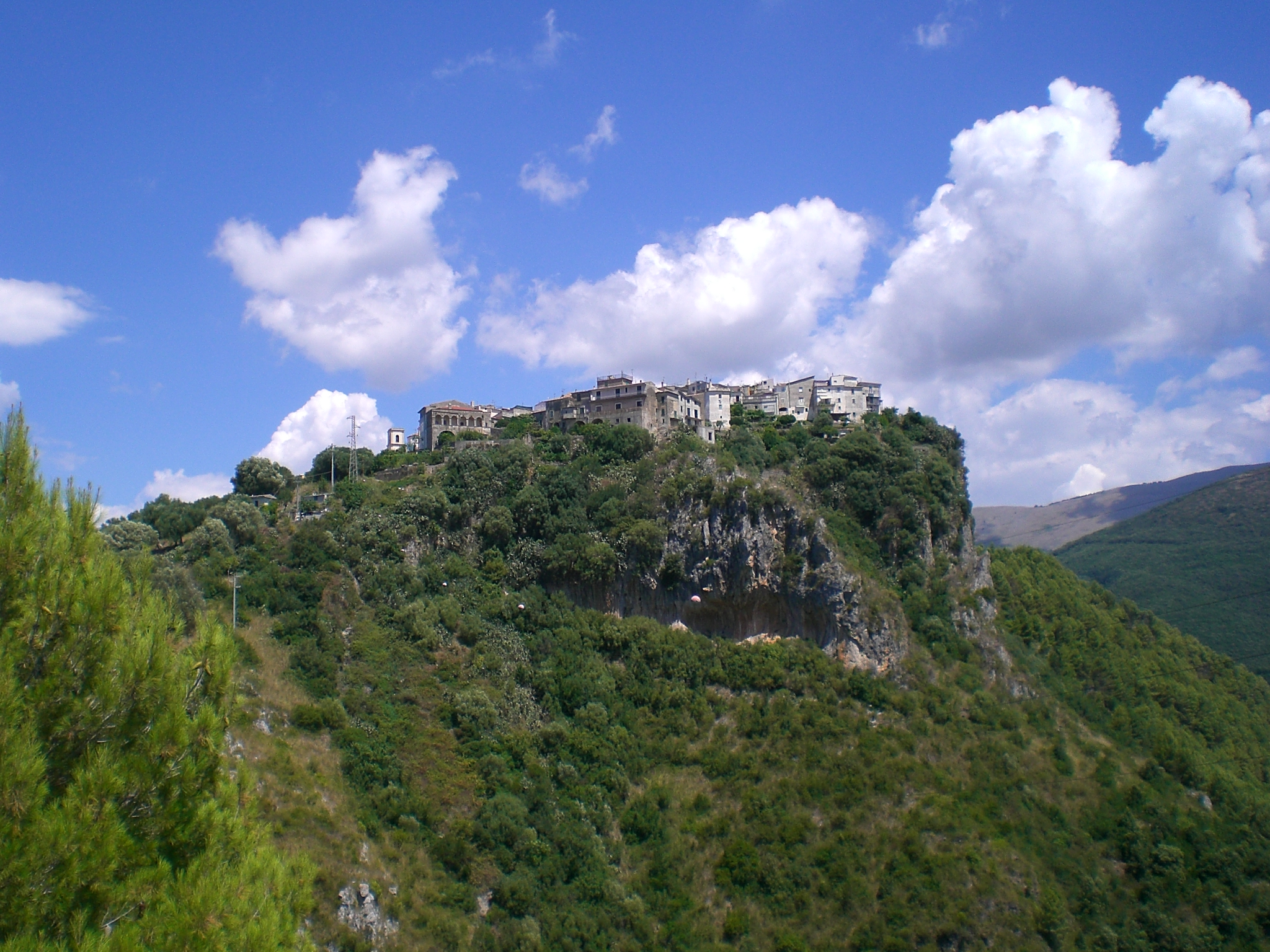
- Panoramic view of Camerota

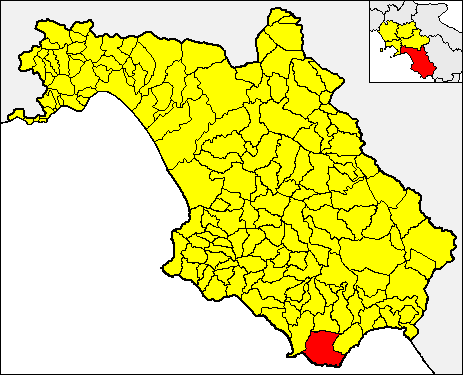
- Camerota within the Province of Salerno

- Location within Italy Location within Campania
- Coordinates: 40°02′N 15°22′E
- Country: Italy
- Region: Campania
- Province: Salerno (SA)
- Frazioni: Lentiscosa, Licusati, Marina di Camerota

Government
  - Mayor: Mario Salvatore Scarpitta

Area
  - Total: 70.58 km^{2} (27.25 sq mi)
- Elevation: 422 m (1,385 ft)

Population (30 April 2017)
  - Total: 7,103
  - Density: 100.6/km^{2} (260.7/sq mi)
- Demonym: Camerotani
- Time zone: UTC+1 (CET)
  - Summer (DST): UTC+2 (CEST)
- Postal code: 84040 (Camerota); 84050 (Lentiscosa, Licusati); 84059 (Marina di Camerota)
- Dialing code: 0974
- ISTAT code: 065021
- Patron saint: St. Vincent
- Saint day: April 5
- Website: Official website

Camerota is a town and comune in the province of Salerno in the Campania region of south-western Italy.

== History ==
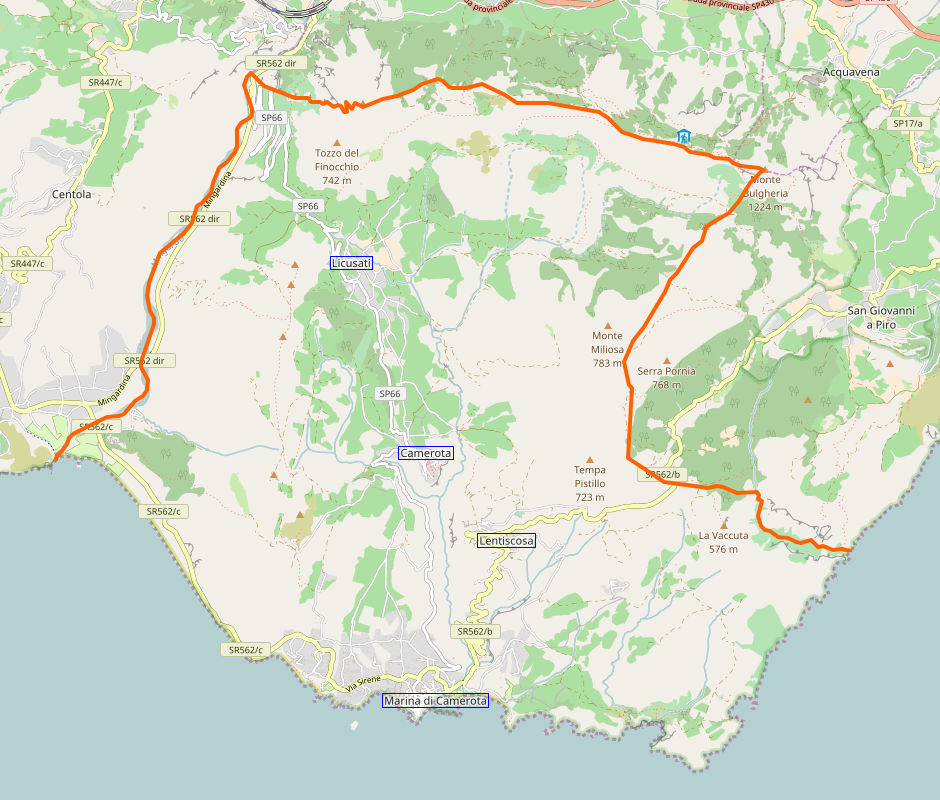
OSM map of Camerota municipality showing the chief town and the three hamlets.

Its toponym could come from the Greek word "καμαρὸτος" (kamaròtos), meaning curved; or from the Latin word "camurus", with the same meaning.

== Geography ==
Camerota is a hill town situated in the southern area of Cilento, 6 km (3.7 mi) north of the Cilentan Coast. The municipality borders with Celle di Bulgheria, Centola, Roccagloriosa and San Giovanni a Piro.

The area is notable for the prehistoric caves of Marina di Camerota, which contain evidence of Neanderthal and early modern human occupation from the Late Middle Paleolithic to the Chalcolithic period.

=== Frazioni ===
The municipality of Camerota (1,585 inh. in the chief town) has 3 hamlets ("frazioni"): Lentiscosa, Licusati and Marina di Camerota.

The municipality includes also several inhabited localities, mainly composed by few scattered houses. The localities are: Cala d'Arconte, Isca della Contessa, L'Assunta, Lido Mingardo (or Spiaggia Mingardo), Monte di Luna and Porto Infreschi.

== See also ==
- Bulgheria
- Cilentan dialect
- Cilento and Vallo di Diano National Park
