= Celle di Bulgheria =

- Comune
- Comune di Celle di Bulgheria
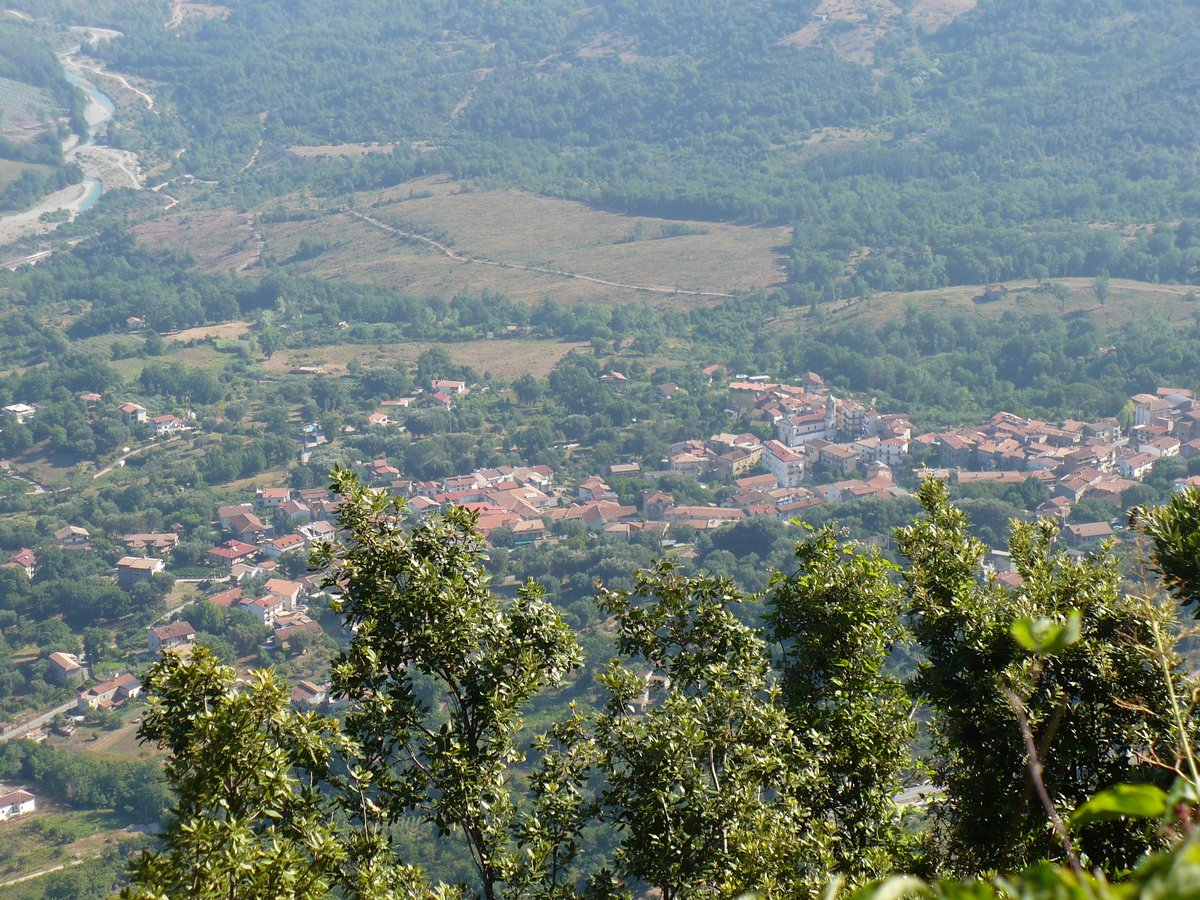
- Panorama from the mount Bulgheria

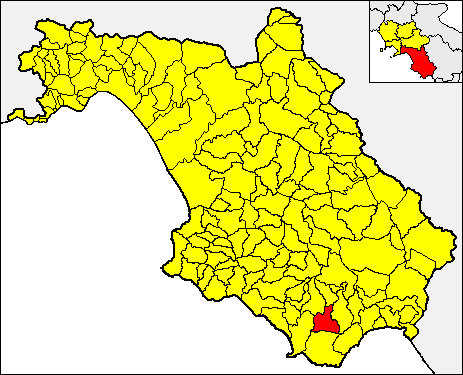
- Celle within the Province of Salerno

- Location within Italy Location within Campania
- Coordinates: 40°06′N 15°24′E
- Country: Italy
- Region: Campania
- Province: Salerno (SA)
- Frazioni: Poderia

Government
  - Mayor: Gino Marotta

Area
  - Total: 31.62 km^{2} (12.21 sq mi)
- Elevation: 234 m (768 ft)

Population (1 January 2018)
  - Total: 1,861
  - Density: 58.86/km^{2} (152.4/sq mi)
- Demonym: Cellesi
- Time zone: UTC+1 (CET)
  - Summer (DST): UTC+2 (CEST)
- Postal code: 84040
- Dialing code: 0974
- ISTAT code: 065038
- Patron saint: Madonna of the Snow
- Saint day: 5 August
- Website: Official website

Celle di Bulgheria, also shortened as Celle, is a town and comune in the province of Salerno in the Campania region of south-western Italy.

== History ==
The town was named after the Bulgars settled here with their leader Altsek (whose father was the second ever leader of Old Great Bulgaria) in the early Middle Ages.

== Geography ==
Celle Bulgheria is located in Southern Cilento, near the mount Bulgheria, and is part of the Cilento and Vallo di Diano National Park. It borders with the municipalities of Camerota, Centola, Laurito, Montano Antilia and Roccagloriosa. Its hamlet (frazione) is the nearby village of Poderia.

== Main sights ==
- De Luca Palace
- Madonna della Neve (Our Lady of the Snow) church
- Saint Sophia church, in Poderia
- Mount Bulgheria

== Transport ==
Celle di Bulgheria counts a railway station, Celle Bulgheria-Roccagloriosa, on the Naples-Salerno-Reggio Calabria railway line.

Crossed by the "Cilentana" highway Salerno-Sapri to the south, has the nearest exits at Poderia (west) and Roccagloriosa (east).

== People ==
- Antonio Maria De Luca (1764–1828), priest and patriot
- Salvatore Venuta (1944–2007), biologist and oncologist

== Twin towns ==
- Veliki Preslav, Bulgaria
- Bolgar, Russia

== See also ==
- Cilentan dialect
- San Severino (Centola)
