= Cape Palinuro =

Headland in Italy

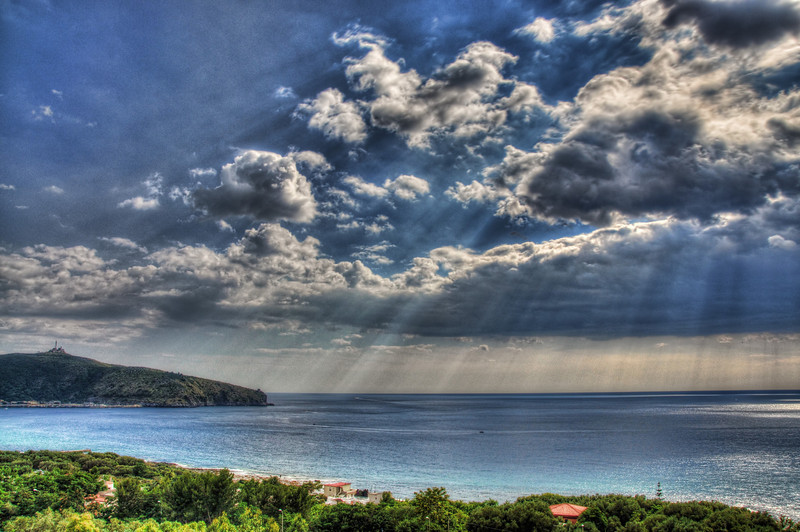
- A view of Capo Palinuro with the lighthouse on the top

- Location in Campania Cape Palinuro (Italy)
- Coordinates: 40°01′35″N 15°16′30″E
- Location: Cilento, Campania, Italy
- Water bodies: Tyrrhenian Sea

Cape Palinuro (Italian: Capo Palinuro) is located in southwestern Italy, approximately 50 miles (80 km) southeast of Salerno, in southern part of Cilento region. It is supposedly named after Palinurus, the helmsman of Aeneas' ship in Virgil's Aeneid.

== Geography ==
Located on the Tyrrhenian Sea, the northern side of the cape is the location of Palinuro, a touristic hamlet of Centola. Southern side faces in the Gulf of Policastro, and is 6 km from Marina di Camerota. It features a lighthouse that is the second highest (70 meters or 230 feet), in all of Italy.

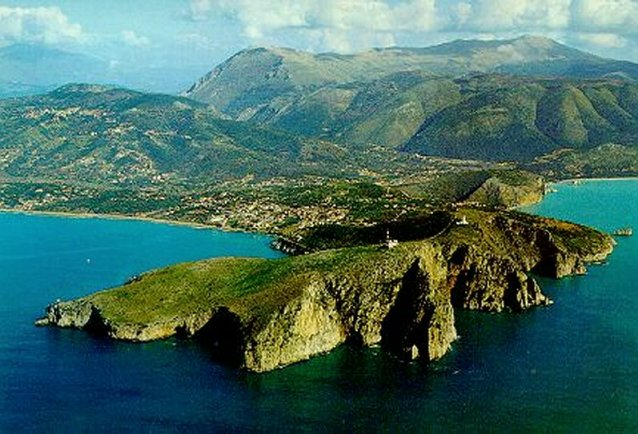
Cape Palinuro

=== Climate ===
Climate data for Cabo Palinuro (1991–2020) (Note: Precipitation, precipitation days and dew point are for the 1981–2010 period)
Month	Jan	Feb	Mar	Apr	May	Jun	Jul	Aug	Sep	Oct	Nov	Dec	Year
Mean daily maximum °C (°F)	13.3 (55.9)	13.55 (56.39)	15.7 (60.3)	18.5 (65.3)	22.4 (72.3)	26.6 (79.9)	29.3 (84.7)	29.9 (85.8)	26.6 (79.9)	22.6 (72.7)	18.4 (65.1)	14.7 (58.5)	20.96 (69.73)
Daily mean °C (°F)	10.5 (50.9)	10.4 (50.7)	12.35 (54.23)	14.9 (58.8)	18.7 (65.7)	22.7 (72.9)	25.4 (77.7)	26.1 (79.0)	22.8 (73.0)	19.4 (66.9)	15.4 (59.7)	11.9 (53.4)	17.55 (63.58)
Mean daily minimum °C (°F)	7.8 (46.0)	7.4 (45.3)	9.2 (48.6)	11.5 (52.7)	15.1 (59.2)	18.9 (66.0)	21.6 (70.9)	22.3 (72.1)	19.1 (66.4)	16.2 (61.2)	12.5 (54.5)	9.3 (48.7)	14.2 (57.6)
Average precipitation mm (inches)	84.5 (3.33)	72.6 (2.86)	67.8 (2.67)	62.9 (2.48)	35.9 (1.41)	19.7 (0.78)	13.6 (0.54)	21.5 (0.85)	59.0 (2.32)	85.7 (3.37)	114.5 (4.51)	94.6 (3.72)	732.3 (28.84)
Average precipitation days (≥ 1.0 mm)	8.9	8.9	8.4	7.9	4.8	2.7	1.7	2.2	7.3	7.3	10.6	10.6	81.3
Average relative humidity (%)	70.9	69.37	70.98	71.56	72.61	73.03	73.07	73.9	71.79	71.15	70.98	69.72	71.59
Average dew point °C (°F)	4.8 (40.6)	3.9 (39.0)	6.1 (43.0)	8.6 (47.5)	12.7 (54.9)	16.1 (61.0)	19.0 (66.2)	19.6 (67.3)	16.4 (61.5)	12.9 (55.2)	8.4 (47.1)	5.4 (41.7)	11.2 (52.1)
Mean monthly sunshine hours	160.6	163.8	202.1	219.0	274.4	307.8	345.7	326.7	249.0	214.2	159.3	147.6	2,770.2
Source: ncei.noaa.gov, (Precipitation-Dew Point 1981-2010)

== See also ==
- Capo Palinuro Lighthouse
