= Scario =

- Frazione
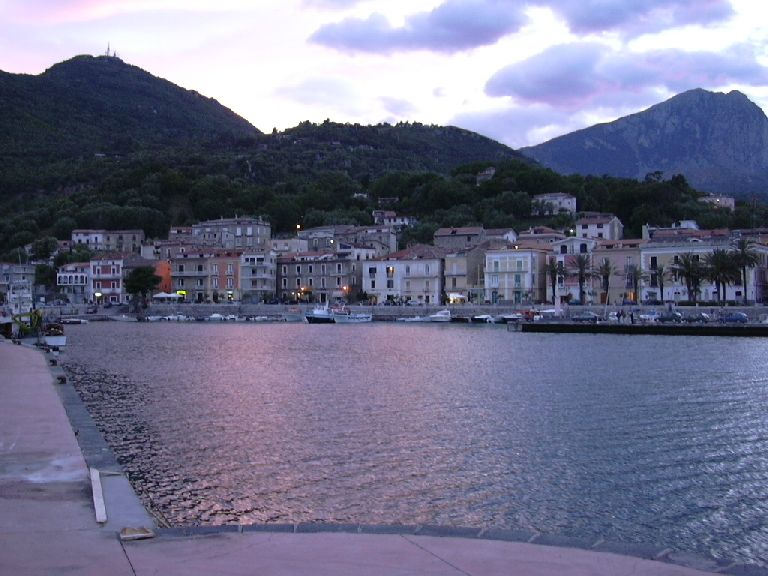

- Location of Scario in Italy
- Coordinates: 40°3′9.83″N 15°29′28.75″E
- Country: Italy
- Region: Campania
- Province: Salerno (SA)
- Comune: San Giovanni a Piro
- Elevation: 6 m (20 ft)

Population
  - Total: 1,124
- Demonym: Scarioti
- Time zone: UTC+1 (CET)
  - Summer (DST): UTC+2 (CEST)
- Postal code: 84070
- Dialing code: (+39) 0974
- Website: Official website

Scario is an Italian village and hamlet (frazione), the largest of the municipality of San Giovanni a Piro in the province of Salerno, Campania region. In 2011, it had a population of 1,124.

== Geography ==
The village is situated in the western corner of the Gulf of Policastro, on the southern side of Cilento. It is 8 km from San Giovanni a Piro, 2.4 from Bussento river mouth, 4 from Policastro Bussentino, 15 from Sapri and 24 from Marina di Camerota. Its westernmost locality, Garagliano, borders the coastal area named Porto Infreschi, which extends from that area to Marina di Camerota.

== Tourism and transports ==
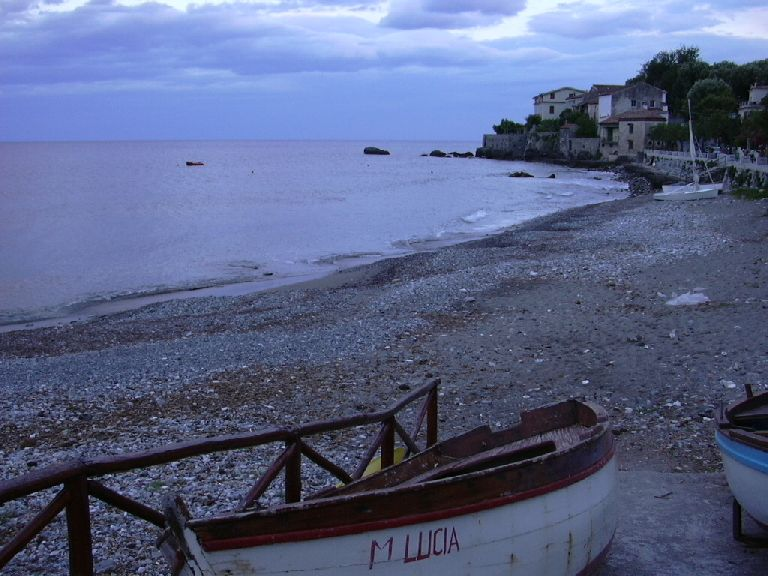
Central beach

Due to its position in Cilento National Park, and the natural environment and the quality of its waters (especially in the western localities of Sant'Anna and Garagliano), Scario has a strong tourist appeal, especially in the summer.

It includes a small port. Its nearest railway station is Policastro Bussentino, 4.5 km distant, on the Naples-Reggio Calabria railway line.

The nearest main road is 6 km away (to the north, at the exit for Policastro Bussentino) which serves the Salerno-Battipaglia-Paestum-Agropoli-Vallo della Lucania-Policastro-Sapri traffic.

== See also ==
- Cilento
- Cilento and Vallo di Diano National Park
