= Roccagloriosa =

- Comune
- Comune di Roccagloriosa
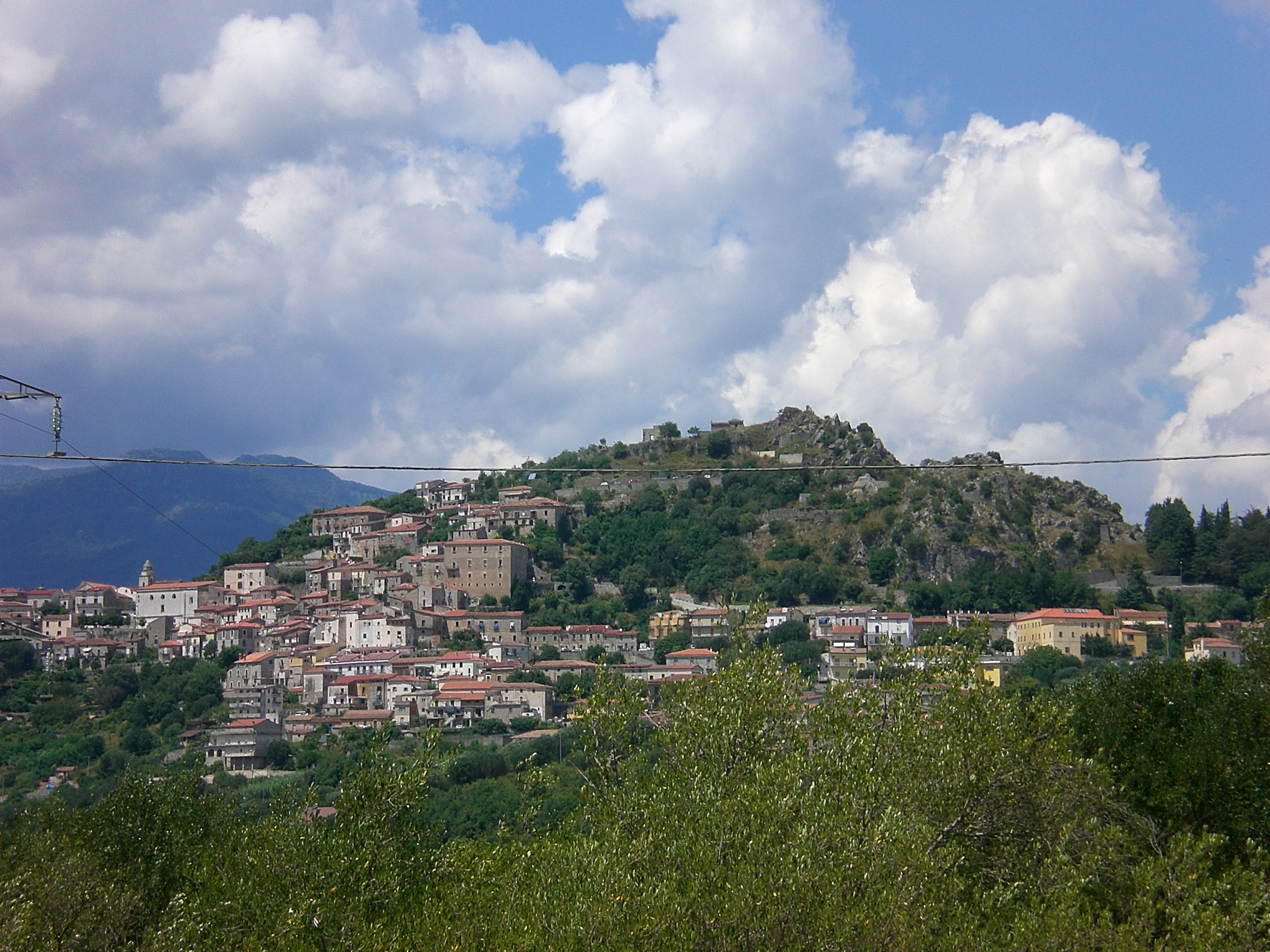

- Coat of arms

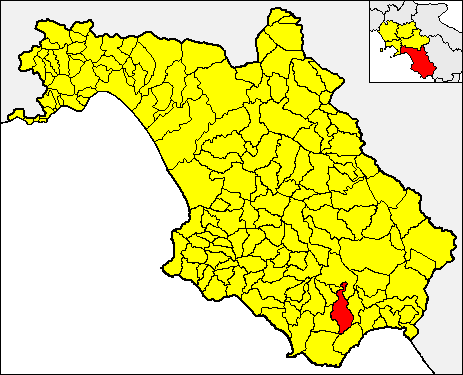
- Roccagloriosa within the Province of Salerno

- Location within Italy Location within Campania
- Coordinates: 40°7′N 15°26′E
- Country: Italy
- Region: Campania
- Province: Salerno (SA)
- Frazioni: Acquavena

Government
  - Mayor: Nicola Marotta

Area
  - Total: 42 km^{2} (16 sq mi)
- Elevation: 430 m (1,410 ft)

Population (31 December 2010)
  - Total: 1,650
  - Density: 39/km^{2} (100/sq mi)
- Demonym(s): Rochetani, Rocchesani, or Roccaglorensi
- Time zone: UTC+1 (CET)
  - Summer (DST): UTC+2 (CEST)
- Postal code: 84060
- Dialing code: 0974
- ISTAT code: 065107
- Patron saint: St. John the Baptist
- Saint day: 24 June
- Website: Official website

Roccagloriosa (Cilentan: 'A Rocca) is a town and comune in the province of Salerno in the Campania region of south-western Italy.

The town is located in southern Cilento. It borders with Alfano, Camerota, Celle di Bulgheria, Laurito, Rofrano, San Giovanni a Piro and Torre Orsaia.

== History ==
On the hill called "Le Chiaie," artifacts dating back to the Bronze Age (2nd millennium BC) have been found. More significant evidence dates to the Iron Age (8th-6th century BC), during which a seasonal settlement developed in the area. From the 5th century BC, a settlement began to form, consisting of elongated rectangular houses built on a stone base.

From the 4th to the 3rd century BC, a defensive perimeter was established around the settlement, consisting of a limestone wall, leaving the necropolis outside. Within the fortified town, the houses are arranged in rectangular blocks. The enclosed area within the defenses spans roughly 26-27 hectares, with only about 18 to 20 hectares suitable for human activities. Despite the relatively large area, the intra-mural space suitable for habitation was not densely populated with buildings, featuring clusters of dwellings interspersed with areas showing minimal signs of human activity. Some habitation areas were located on a slightly lower plateau outside the walled area, yet there were no discernible differences between the dwellings inside and outside the walls, suggesting they were inhabited by large family groups or clans with members of varying social ranks.

On a fragment of a bronze tablet found during archaeological excavations, dating to the 4th-3rd century BCE, a statute concerning the civil institutional organization of the ancient town was discovered, indicating a significant complexity in the civil and administrative life of the Lucani people.

In the 1st century BCE, survivors of the destruction of Orbitania erected a new settlement, not far from the first one, on a rocky ridge called Armo. The settlement was called Patrìzia, modern-day Rocchetta, a town that thrived until the 4th century AD.

== See also ==
- Bulgheria
- Cilentan language
