= Centola =

- Comune
- Comune di Centola
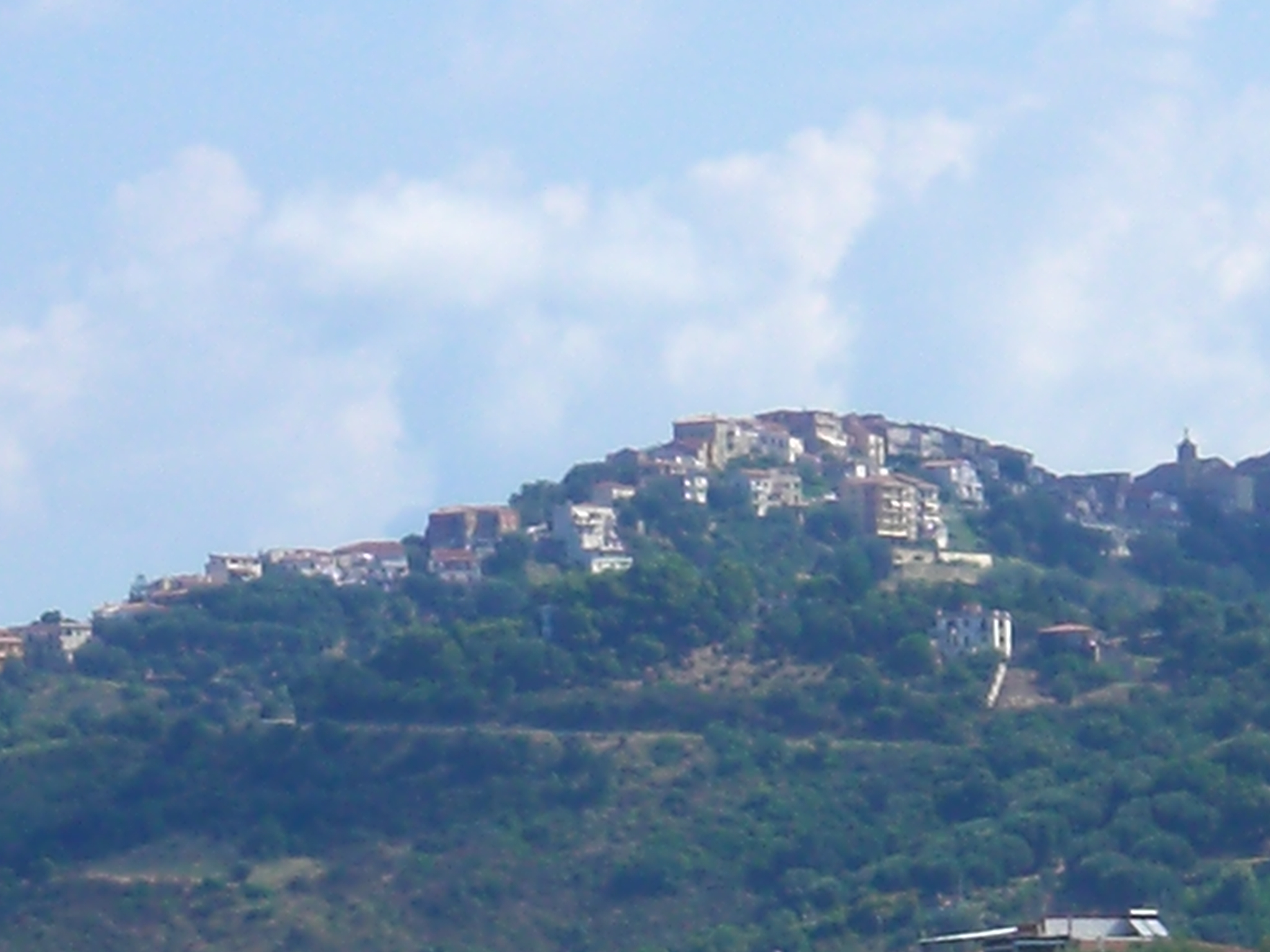

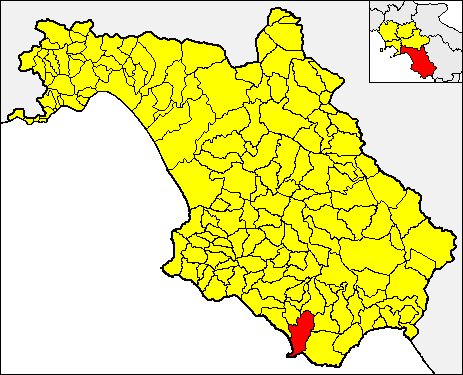
- Centola within the Province of Salerno

- Location within Italy Location within Campania
- Coordinates: 40°04′N 15°19′E
- Country: Italy
- Region: Campania
- Province: Salerno (SA)
- Frazioni: Foria, Palinuro, San Nicola, San Severino

Government
  - Mayor: Carmelo Stanziola

Area
  - Total: 47 km^{2} (18 sq mi)
- Elevation: 336 m (1,102 ft)

Population (30 June 2017)
  - Total: 5,144
  - Density: 110/km^{2} (280/sq mi)
- Demonym: Centolesi
- Time zone: UTC+1 (CET)
  - Summer (DST): UTC+2 (CEST)
- Postal code: 84051
- Dialing code: 0974
- ISTAT code: 065039
- Patron saint: Sant'Apollonio
- Saint day: -
- Website: Official website

Centola (Cilentan: Cendula) is a town and comune in the province of Salerno in the Campania region of south-western Italy.

== Geography ==
Located in southern Cilento, Centola borders with the municipalities of Camerota, Celle di Bulgheria, Montano Antilia, Pisciotta and San Mauro la Bruca.

The municipality counts the town itself (2,550 inhabitants) and four hamlets (frazioni). Their population is listed under brackets.

- Palinuro (1,202 inhabitants): the largest frazione, located by the sea
- Foria (516 inhabitants). Located not too far from Centola
- San Severino (435 inhabitants): it is home to medieval ruins, located by "Centola" railway station
- San Nicola (370 inhabitants), the littlest hamlet of the comune

== See also ==
- Cilento
- Cape Palinuro
- Cilentan Coast
