= Foria, Centola =

Foria
- Frazione
- Location of Foria in Italy
- Coordinates: 40°09′03″N 15°32′32″E
- Country: Italy
- Region: Campania
- Province: Salerno (SA)
- Comune: Centola
- Elevation: 310 m (1,020 ft)

Population (2011)
  - Total: 516
- Time zone: UTC+1 (CET)
  - Summer (DST): UTC+2 (CEST)
- Postal code: 84051
- Dialing code: (+39) 0974

Foria is a village (frazione) of the municipality of Centola in the Province of Salerno, Campania, Italy.

== Demographics ==
In 2011, the population of Foria was of 516.

== Transportation ==
Foria is served by Salerno provincial roads SR 447, SR 447a, and SP 109.
