= Bulgheria =

Mountain in Italy

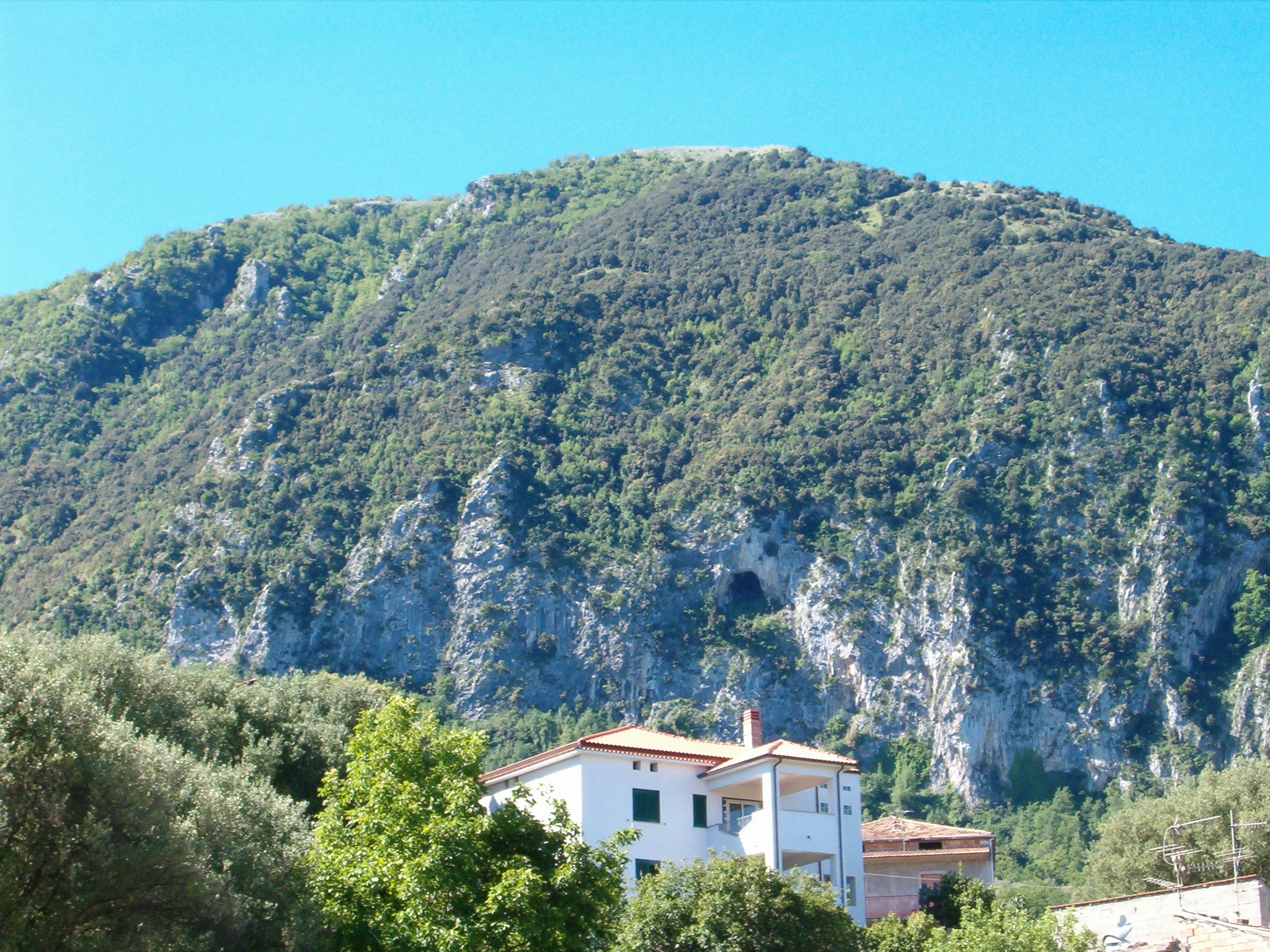

Highest point
- Elevation: 1,225 m (4,019 ft)
- Prominence: 913 m (2,995 ft)
- Isolation: 12.8 km (8.0 mi)
- Coordinates: 40°04′00″N 15°25′00″E

Geography
- Location within Italy
- Location: Cilento, Province of Salerno, Campania, Italy

Bulgheria is a 1,225 metres (4,019 ft) mountain in the southern Cilento region of the Province of Salerno, in the Campania region, of southern Italy.

== Geography ==
The mountain is part of the Cilento and Vallo di Diano National Park. The peak is near the southern Cilentan Coast in the municipalities of Celle di Bulgheria and Camerota, near San Giovanni a Piro and Roccagloriosa.

== History ==
Its name comes from the Bulgar settlers, who settled here before the year 500, in the town of Celle di Bulgheria which stands on its slopes to the east side.

The mountain is also known as the "sleeping lioness", because it looks like a huge lion resting with his eyes turned towards the east, and then the locals like to think it's a lion that is there to protect them.
