= Palinuro =

- Frazione
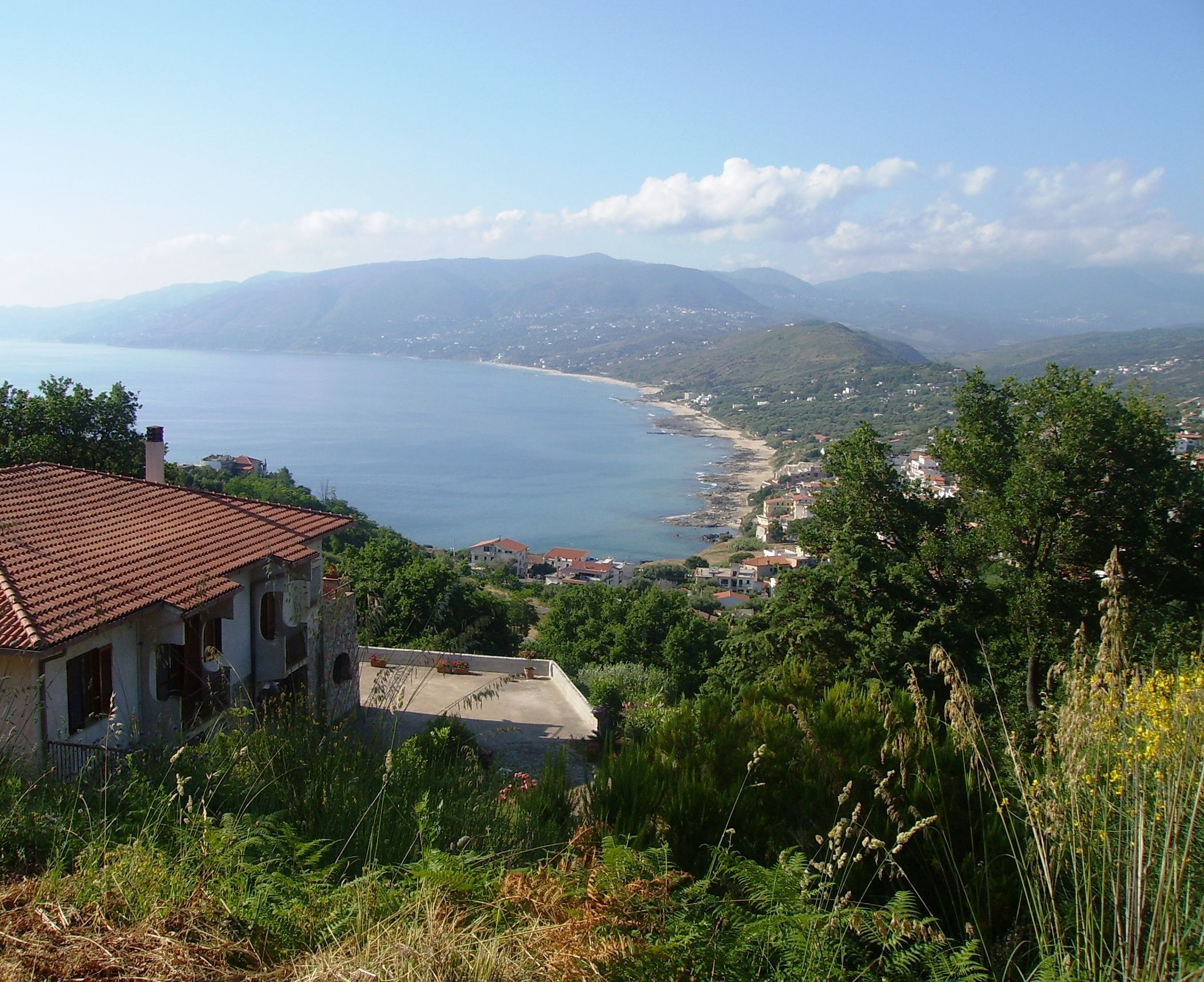
- Palinuro seen from the surrounding hills

- Location of Palinuro in Italy
- Coordinates: 40°02′00″N 15°17′00″E
- Country: Italy
- Region: Campania
- Province: Salerno (SA)
- Comune: Centola
- Elevation: 5 m (16 ft)

Population
  - Total: 1,500
- Demonym: Palinuresi
- Time zone: UTC+1 (CET)
  - Summer (DST): UTC+2 (CEST)
- Postal code: 84051
- Dialing code: (+39) 0974

Palinuro is an Italian small town, the most populated civil parish (frazione) of Centola, Province of Salerno, in the Campania region. The name of the town is derived from Palinurus, the helmsman of Aeneas, as recorded in the fifth and sixth books of the Aeneid.

== Geography ==
Palinuro lies on the southern side of Cilento, on the Tyrrhenian Sea and in the northern part of Cape Palinuro. The town, situated at the estuaries of the Lambro and Mingardo rivers, is also the main port of the comune. It is 7 km from Centola, 8 km from Marina di Camerota, 10 km from Pisciotta and 80 km from Salerno.

== Tourism ==
Palinuro is part of the Cilento and Vallo di Diano National Park, an area of "shrubland" typical of Mediterranean countries.

It is a tourist destination, especially in summer, due to the cleanliness of its waters and its beaches; and is regularly awarded five stars Blue Flag
The town is also known for the caves along its coast, which are regularly visited, especially by divers.

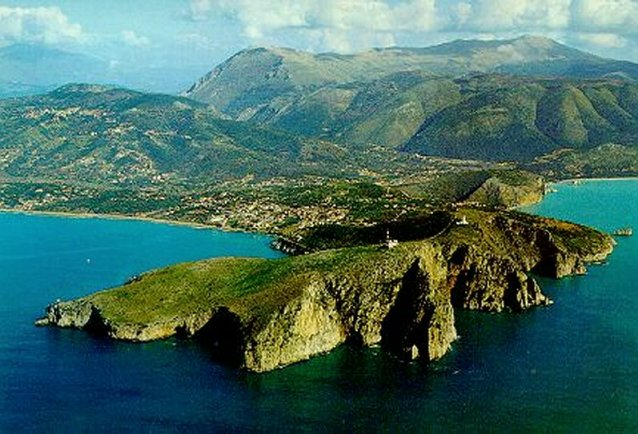
Cape Palinuro

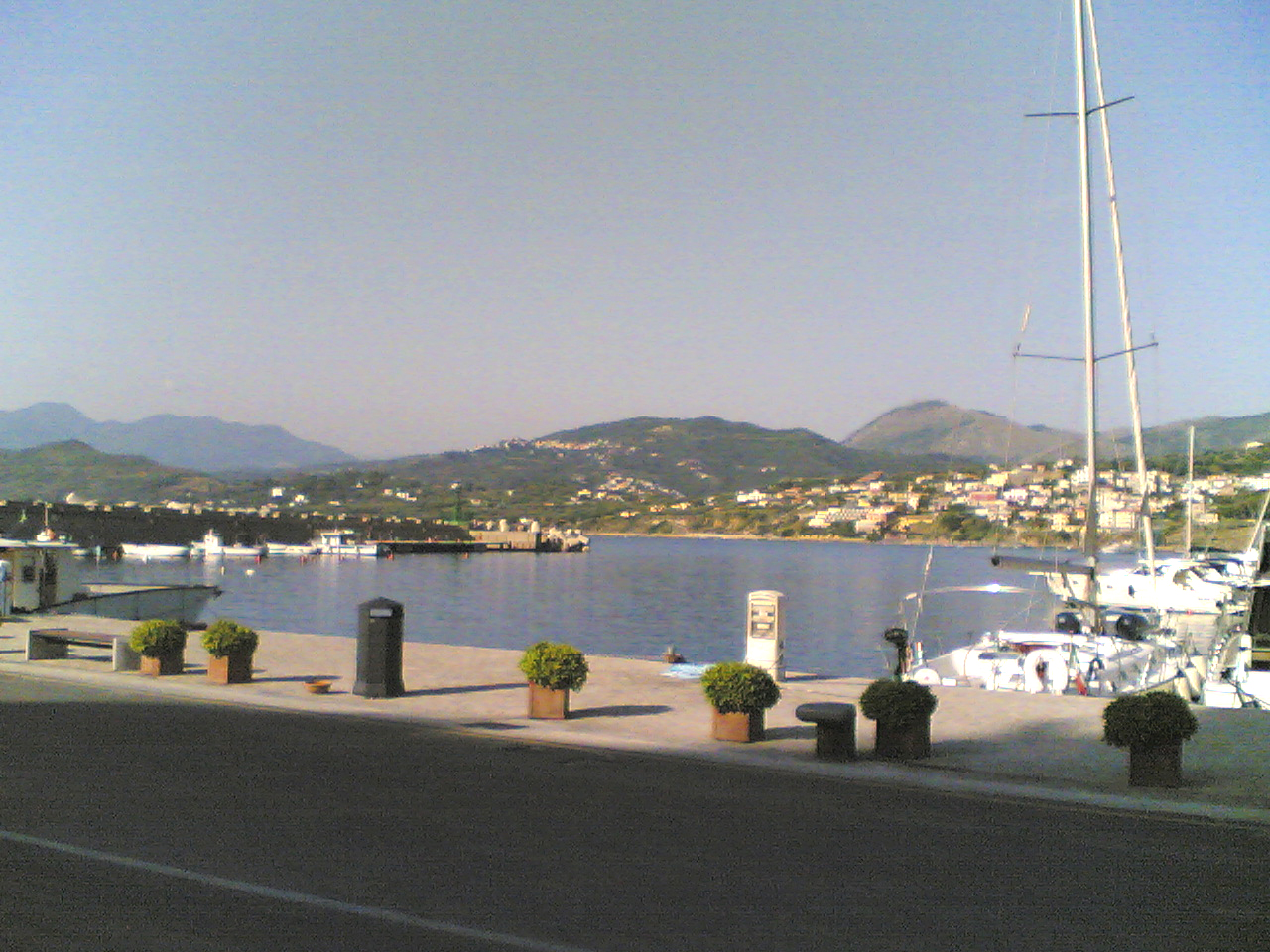
The port of Palinuro

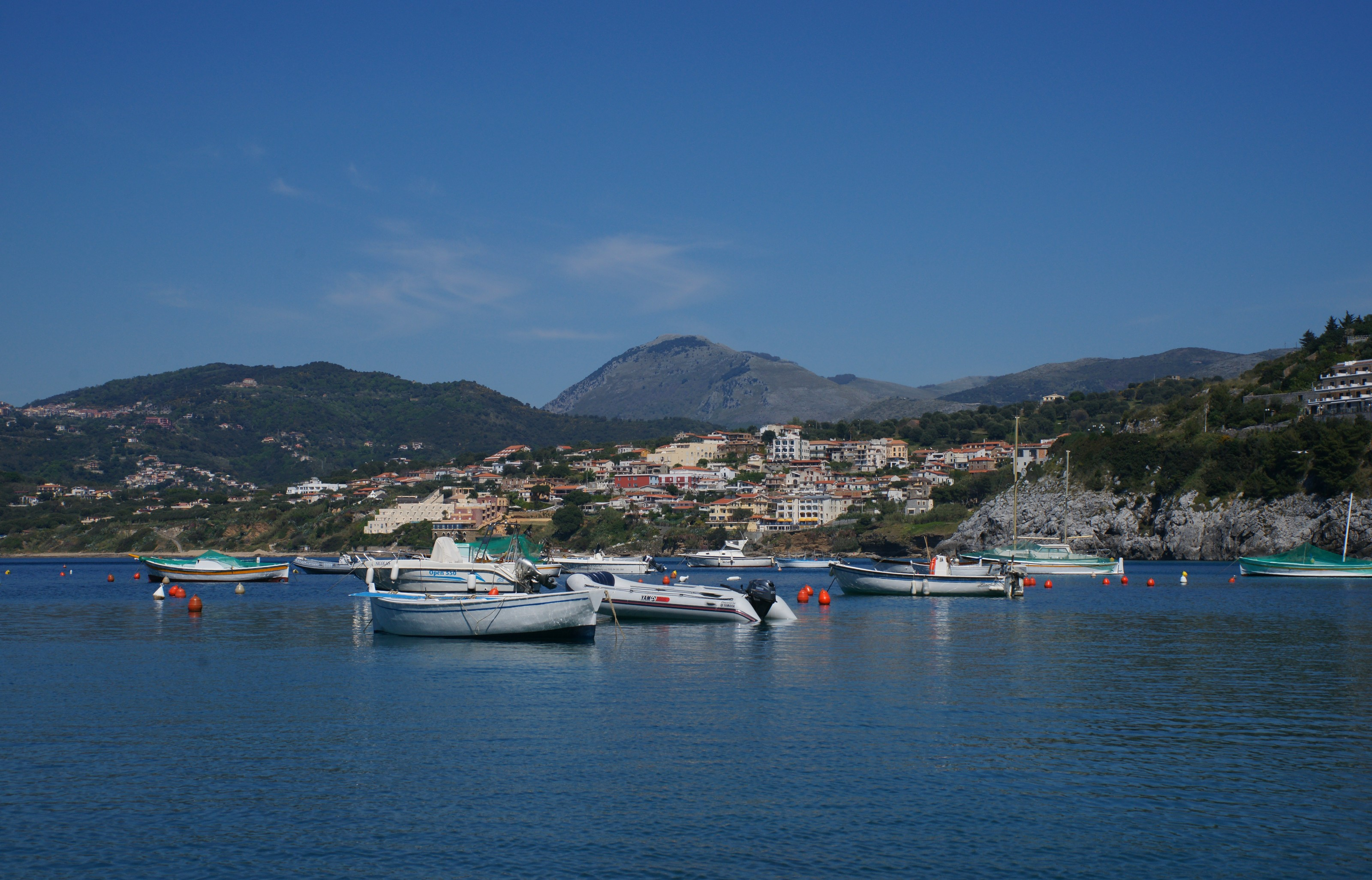
View of Palinuro from the sea

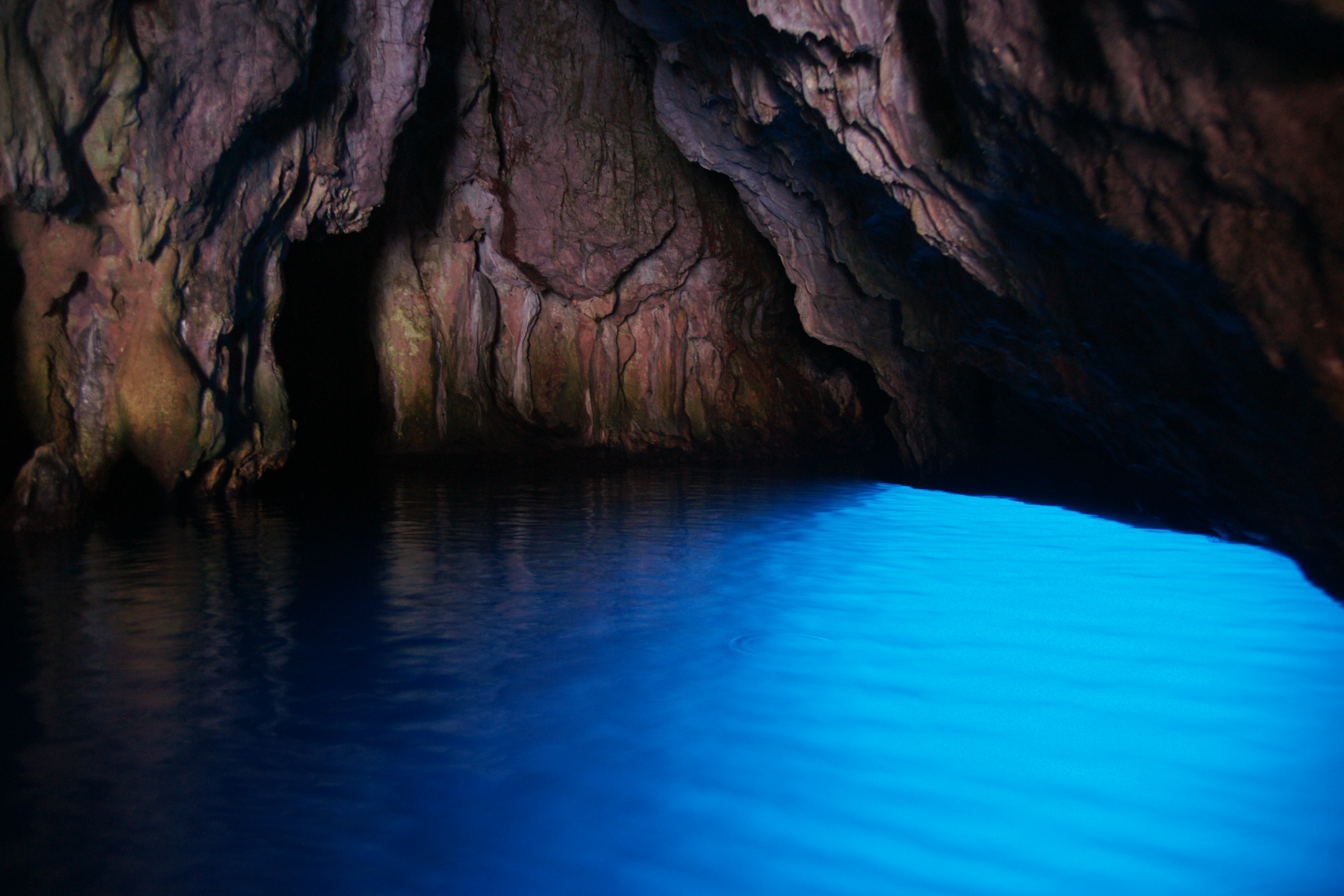
Blue cave

== Transport ==
The town is linked to Salerno and Naples by hydrofoils. The nearest main road is 10 km to the north, connecting Salerno-Battipaglia-Paestum-Agropoli-Vallo della Lucania-Policastro-Sapri.

The nearest railway station, Pisciotta-Palinuro (on the Naples-Reggio Calabria line) is 8 km to the north and is linked to the town by regular buses.

== Culture ==
The Arco Naturale beach of Palinuro was selected as a location in various films including Hercules and the Conquest of Atlantis (1961), Jason and the Argonauts (1963), The Genesis Children (1971), and Clash of the Titans (1981).

== Climate ==
Climate data for Capo Palinuro (1991–2020)
Month	Jan	Feb	Mar	Apr	May	Jun	Jul	Aug	Sep	Oct	Nov	Dec	Year
Mean daily maximum °C (°F)	12.3 (54.1)	12.5 (54.5)	14.9 (58.8)	18.0 (64.4)	22.5 (72.5)	27.0 (80.6)	30.1 (86.2)	30.8 (87.4)	27.0 (80.6)	22.6 (72.7)	17.8 (64.0)	13.8 (56.8)	20.8 (69.4)
Daily mean °C (°F)	10.0 (50.0)	9.9 (49.8)	12.0 (53.6)	14.7 (58.5)	18.8 (65.8)	22.9 (73.2)	25.8 (78.4)	26.5 (79.7)	23.0 (73.4)	19.4 (66.9)	15.1 (59.2)	11.5 (52.7)	17.5 (63.4)
Mean daily minimum °C (°F)	7.8 (46.0)	7.4 (45.3)	9.1 (48.4)	11.5 (52.7)	15.1 (59.2)	18.8 (65.8)	21.6 (70.9)	22.3 (72.1)	19.0 (66.2)	16.2 (61.2)	12.3 (54.1)	9.2 (48.6)	14.2 (57.5)
Average precipitation mm (inches)	89 (3.5)	70 (2.8)	67 (2.6)	63 (2.5)	37 (1.5)	19 (0.7)	14 (0.6)	21 (0.8)	65 (2.6)	87 (3.4)	121 (4.8)	96 (3.8)	749 (29.6)
Average precipitation days (≥ 1.0 mm)	9	9	8	8	5	2	2	3	5	8	10	10	79
Source 1: Istituto Superiore per la Protezione e la Ricerca Ambientale (precipitation 1981–2010)
Source 2: Climi e viaggi (precipitation days)

== See also ==
- San Severino (Centola)
- Cilentan language
- Cilento and Vallo di Diano National Park
