= San Giovanni a Piro =

- Comune
- Comune di San Giovanni a Piro
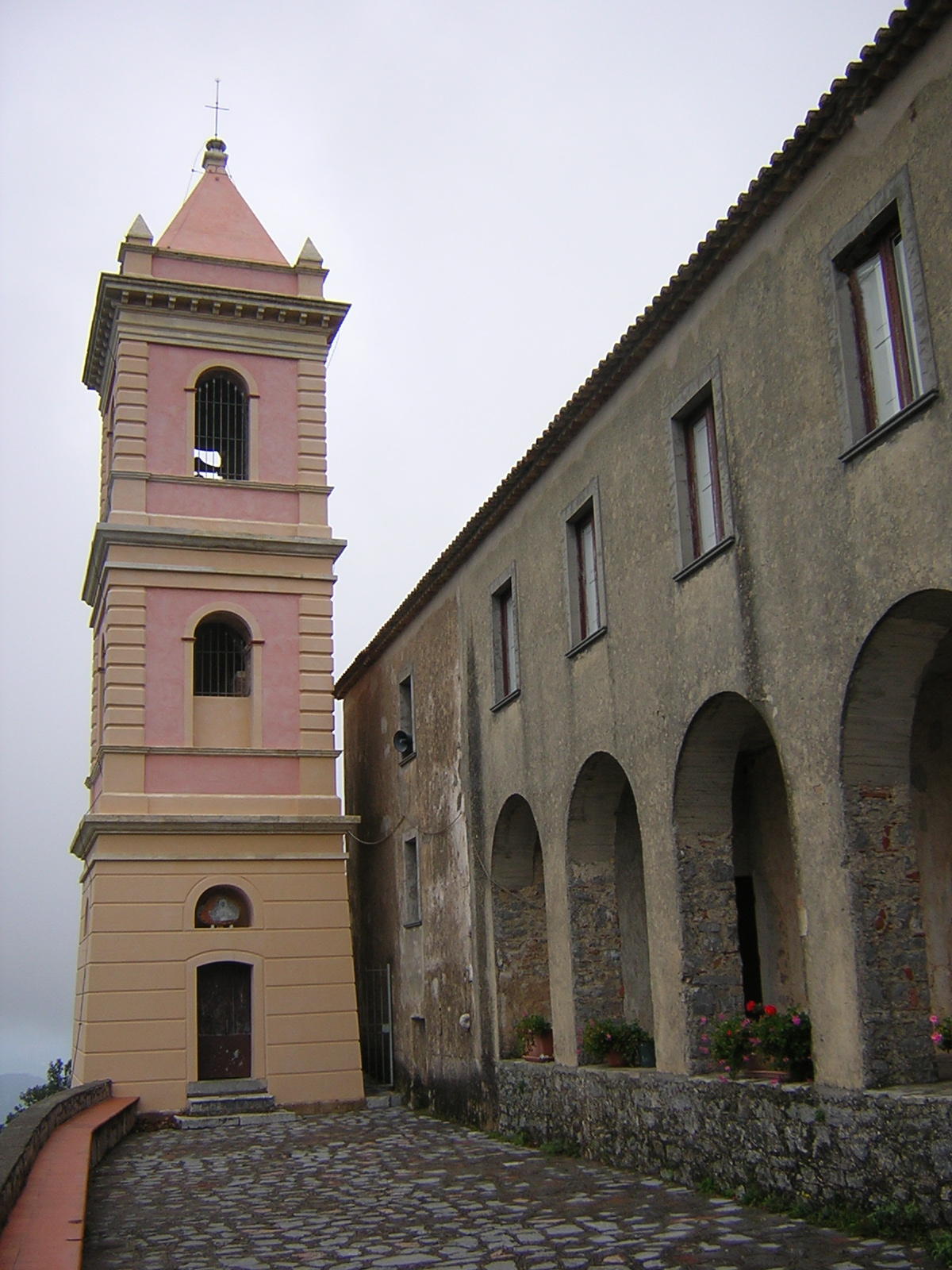
- Sanctuary of Pietrasanta

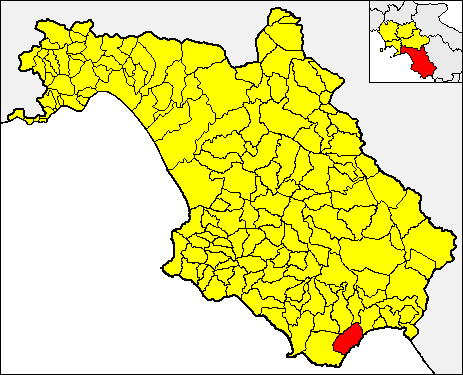
- San Giovanni within the Province of Salerno

- Location within Italy Location within Campania
- Coordinates: 40°3′4.68″N 15°27′3.6″E
- Country: Italy
- Region: Campania
- Province: Salerno (SA)
- Frazioni: Bosco, Scario

Government
  - Mayor: Ferdinando Palazzo

Area
  - Total: 37.9 km^{2} (14.6 sq mi)
- Elevation: 450 m (1,480 ft)

Population (31 December 2010)
  - Total: 3,868
  - Density: 102/km^{2} (264/sq mi)
- Demonym: Sangiovannesi
- Time zone: UTC+1 (CET)
  - Summer (DST): UTC+2 (CEST)
- Postal code: 84070
- Dialing code: 0974
- Patron saint: Madonna of Pietrasanta
- Saint day: Last Sunday of May
- Website: Official website

San Giovanni a Piro (Cilentan: San Giuanni) is a town and comune in the province of Salerno in the Campania region of southern Italy.

== Geography ==
The town is located on a hill on the road linking Marina di Camerota to Policastro Bussentino. The municipality counts part of the coastal area of Porto Infreschi, in which is located the Sanctuary of Pietrasanta. It borders with the municipalities of Camerota, Roccagloriosa, Santa Marina and Torre Orsaia.

San Giovanni a Piro counts two hamlets (frazioni), Bosco and Scario.

== See also ==
- Scario
- Cilentan Coast
