= Marina di Camerota =

- Frazione
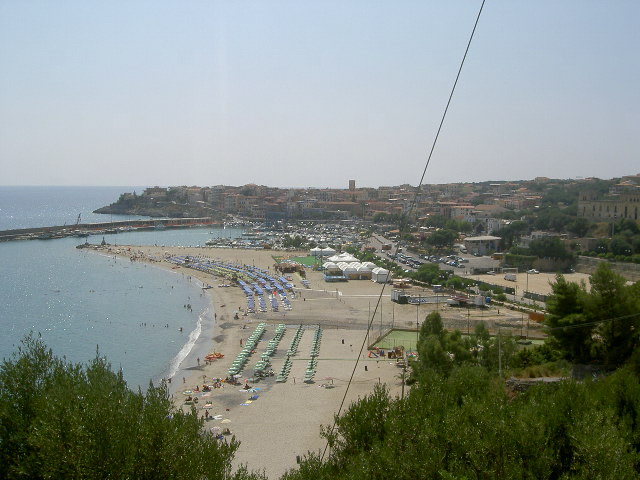
- Panoramic view

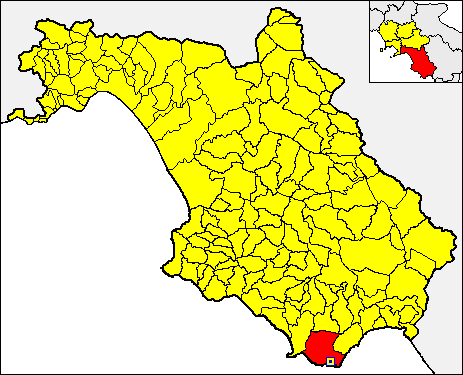
- Locator map within the province and the municipality

- Location of Marina di Camerota in Italy
- Coordinates: 40°00′00″N 15°22′00″E
- Country: Italy
- Region: Campania
- Province: Salerno (SA)
- Comune: Camerota
- Elevation: 5 m (16 ft)

Population (2011)
  - Total: 2,674
- Demonym: Marinai
- Time zone: UTC+1 (CET)
  - Summer (DST): UTC+2 (CEST)
- Postal code: 84059
- Dialing code: (+39) 0974

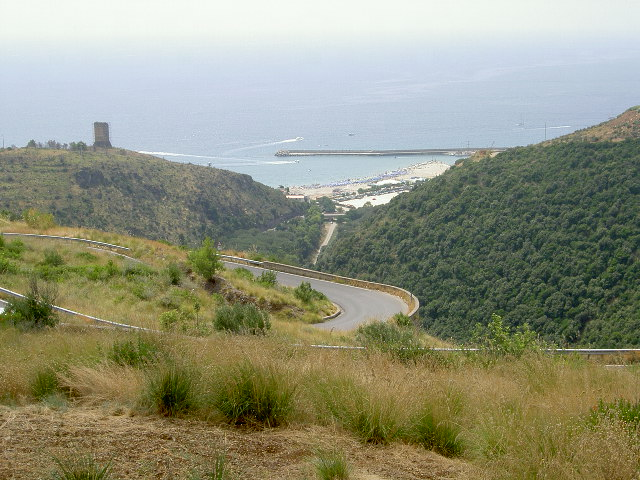
View from the road to San Giovanni a Piro and Policastro Bussentino

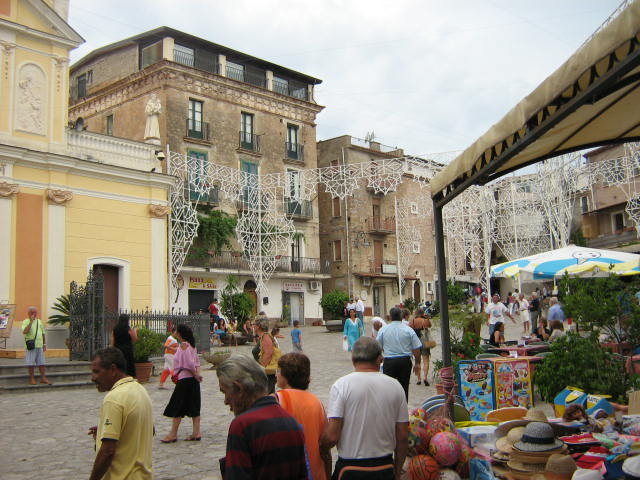
"Piazza San Domenico", main town square

Marina di Camerota is an Italian town, the largest Civil parish (frazione) of Camerota, situated in the province of Salerno, Campania. In 2007 it had a population of 2,674.

== Geography ==
Marina di Camerota lies on the southern side of Cilento, on the Tyrrhenian Sea, and it is the port of its "commune". The town is 5 km from Camerota, 8 from Palinuro, 25 from Policastro, and 90 from Salerno. The town, located on 40°N parallel, is the southernmost inhabited area of Campania.

== History ==
In the 17th century Marina di Linfreschi was a little group of houses, and the urban population expanded it around a church of Saint Dominic.

The town was a place of emigration to South America, especially to Venezuela, in the 19th and 20th centuries. The relationship with the American country is still strong, evidenced, for example, by a statue of Simón Bolívar built in the middle of the village, in front of the harbour side.

== Tourism ==
The town is part of the Cilento and Vallo di Diano National Park, whose natural environment is composed of "Maquis", typical of Mediterranean countries. It is a main tourism location, especially in the summer, due to the quality of its water, which has earned it the Blue Flag beach award every year since 2000.

Marina di Camerota is also interesting for its prehistoric caves, with human fossils discovered in 1980s. One of these caves, located in Lentiscella zone, is a museum which accommodates the "Lion of Caprera" (Leone di Caprera), a little schooner which in 1880–1881 crossed the Atlantic Ocean from Montevideo to Livorno.

Another point of interest is represented by three "telegraph towers", built by Bourbons and included in a system of defence and communication points, along the southern side of the Tyrrhenian coast.

=== Beaches ===
Beaches in Marina di Camerota include:

- Calanca: situated between two rock sides, it has fine sand, and a low sea depth. It has a view towards Marina di Camerota's Isle. It can be reached by a 5 minute walk from the centre.
- Marina delle Barche, with fine sand, located 10 minutes walk from the centre.
- Lentiscelle, formed by pebbles, 1 km away from the centre. The beach has pebbles.
- Mingardo: a series of beaches that go from Marina di Camerota to Palinuro. They have fine sand and high sea depth.
- Spiaggia del Troncone: it has fine pebbles, protected by a high rockface. Since 2011 here naturism is authorized by municipal administration of Camerota

== Transport ==
The main infrastructure in the town is represented by the port, linked also to Salerno and Naples by hydrofoils. Nearest main road is distant 20 km (north) and is the Salerno-Battipaglia-Paestum-Agropoli-Vallo della Lucania-Policastro-Sapri. Nearest railway station is Pisciotta-Palinuro, 20 km far, on Naples-Reggio Calabria line.

== See also ==
- Camerota
- Cilento
- Cilento, Vallo di Diano and Alburni National Park
