= Albanella =

Municipality in Campania, Italy

- Comune
- Comune di Albanella
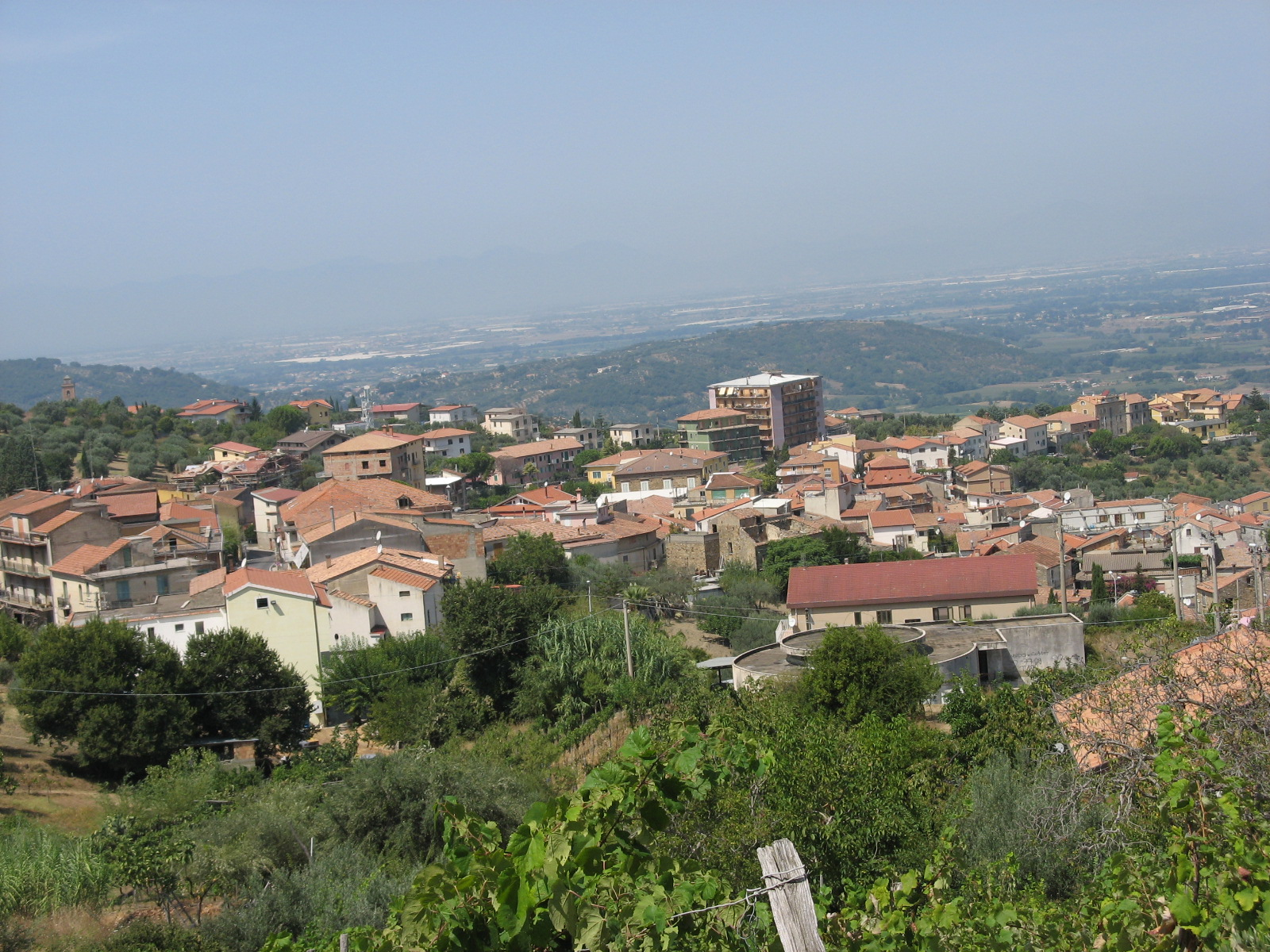

- Coat of arms
- Motto: La terra degli ulivi
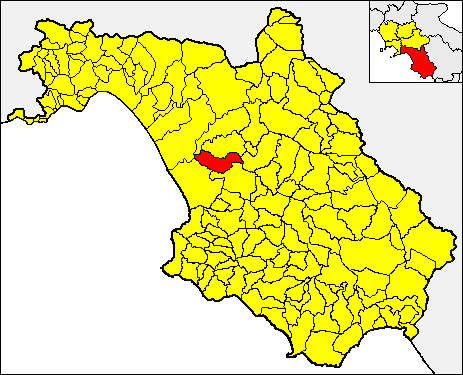
- Albanella within the Province of Salerno

- Location of Albanella in Italy Albanella (Campania)
- Coordinates: 40°29′N 15°7′E
- Country: Italy
- Region: Campania
- Province: Salerno
- Frazioni: Borgo San Cesareo, Bosco, Cerrina, Forestelle, Matinella, San Chirico, San Nicola, Tempa delle Guardie

Government
  - Mayor: Renato Iosca

Area
  - Total: 40.24 km^{2} (15.54 sq mi)
- Elevation: 205 m (673 ft)

Population (28 February 2017)
  - Total: 6,437
  - Density: 160.0/km^{2} (414.3/sq mi)
- Demonym: Albanellesi
- Time zone: UTC+1 (CET)
  - Summer (DST): UTC+2 (CEST)
- Postal code: 84044
- Dialing code: 0828
- ISTAT code: 065003
- Patron saint: Sophia of Rome and Matthew the Evangelist
- Saint day: 15 May (Saint Sophia) and 21 September (Saint Matthew)
- Website: Official website

Albanella is a town and municipality (Italian: comune) in the province of Salerno in the Campania region of south-western Italy. It is 51 kilometres (32 mi) from the city of Salerno.

The town slogan is "The Land of the Olive Trees" (Italian: La terra degli ulivi). Olive oil is one of the principal products of the town.

== Geography ==
The town is located halfway between Monti Alburni and the Gulf of Salerno, on a hill commanding the plain of the Sele River. The rest of the municipal area is either flat or, between the Sele and Calore Lucano rivers to the north and Monte Soprano (1,082 m) to the south, hilly.

== History ==
Lying on hills rich with olive trees, Albanella was founded in the 11th century by refugees from Paestum, seeking for a site which would be safe from Saracen raids. The most ancient settlement is in fact on the hill's side which is hidden from the sea.

Several archaeological findings are now in the National Archaeological Museum in Paestum and in the National Archaeological Museum of Naples.

== Frazioni ==
The comune includes the following hamlets (frazioni):

Frazione and localities	Inhabitants	Altitude (metres)	Distance from main town
Albanella (capital)	1.585	205 m	--------
Matinella	1.780	43 m	6 km
Borgo San Cesareo	265	26 m	9 km
San Nicola	188	55 m	3 km
Tempa delle Guardie	122	151 m	1.5 km
Piano del Carpine	82	100 m	3 km
Bosco	80	100 m	3 km
Vuccolo Cappasanta	73	29 m	4 km
San Cesareo	55	27 m	9 km
Perelle	53	86 m	2.5 km
Bosco Camerine	46	157 m	3.5 km
Cerrina	39	63 m	3 km
Vallecentanni	36	75 m	5.5 km
Santa Croce	28	180 m	4 km
Forestelle	25	85 m	2 km
San Chirico	22	51 m	5 km
Raccoli	14	36 m	3.5 km

=== Matinella ===
Matinella is the largest frazione in the comune of Albanella, located about 6 km from the center of the township at the intersection of roads from Eboli (via Persano) and Altavilla Silentina which leads to Capaccio-Paestum, and the Provincial Road No. 11 from Ponte Barizzo which leads to Albanella. Because of the low-lying country in recent decades the village has experienced significant population growth that has brought almost a third of the municipal population.

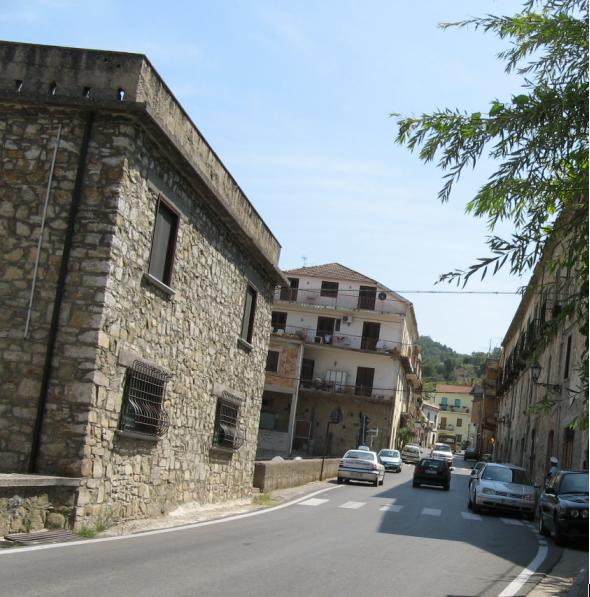
Via Roma, Albanella

=== Borgo San Cesareo ===
In 1950, the government launched a series of legislative measures in Agrarian Reform. These measures, implemented in specific provinces (Campania, Lazio, Puglia, etc. ..) had the goal of expropriating the land of large landowners to local laborers and peasants. This led to the creation of the agricultural village and frazione of Borgo San Cesareo, a small village which is about 9 km from Albanella town.

=== San Nicola ===
The frazione of San Nicola is located halfway between Albanella town and the frazione Matinella along the Provincial Road 11. Its development is due to the important road junction that links to Albanella and which leads to Altavilla Silentina and Eboli.

=== Bosco ===
Bosco is an ancient frazione which takes its name from the vast forests on the slopes of the hills that once lay to the north-east of the village. After centuries of deforestation for timber and to create land for pasture or cultivation the ancient "Bosco" forest is only a small area today of about one hundred acres, bordering the territory of Castelcivita and Roccadaspide, saved through by the WWF.

== Main sights ==
=== Church of Santa Sofia ===
Built in the 16th century.

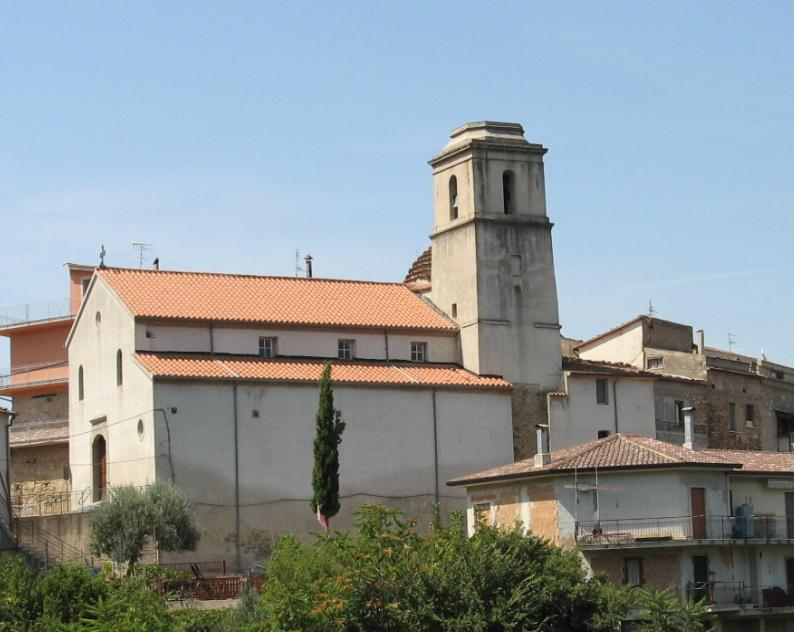
Church of San Matteo

=== Church of St. Matthew (San Matteo) ===
Dating back to 1400, this church stands in the heart of the historic center on a small hill where there was previously an old Roman settlement. The church is characterized by two aisles and a bell tower in Romanesque style, and has an organ.

=== Chapel of the Congregation of SS. Rosario ===
It is located in the old town opposite the Church of St. Matthew. It is the newest of the three Catholic churches in Albanella, dating back to the 19th century. The external façade has a majolica panel, realized in Vietri, depicting the Madonna del Rosario between St. Dominic and St. Catherine of Siena.

=== Church of San Gennaro ===
Better known as the Church of St. Anne (Chiesa di Sant'Anna) because of the statue of the saint, it is located in the frazione of Matinella.

=== Church of San Giuseppe Lavoratore ===
A modern church built in the 20th century located in the frazione of Borgo San Cesareo.

== Wind farm ==
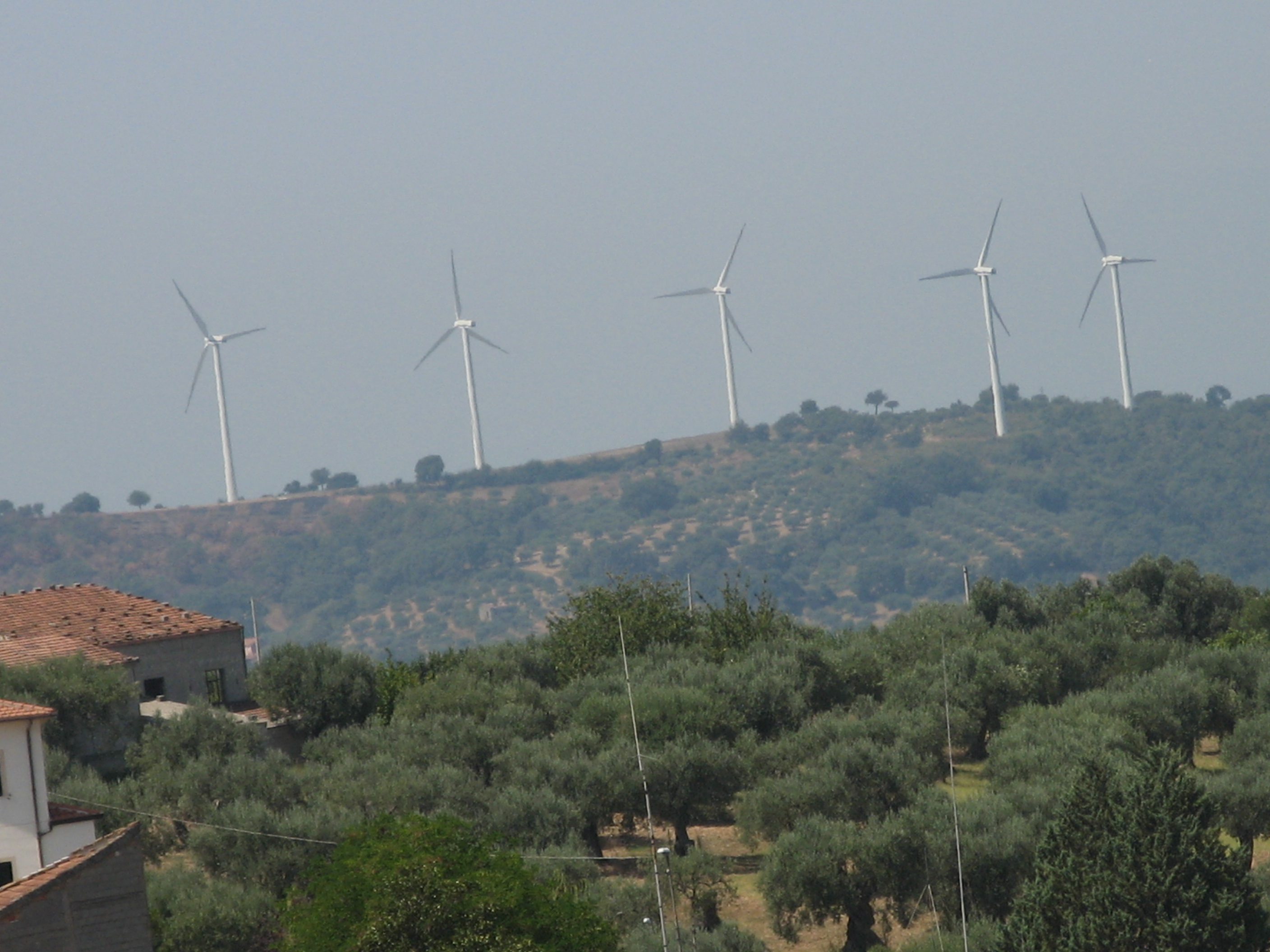
Wind farm in Albanella.

On the hill of San Chirico, a few kilometres west of Albanella town, are ten wind turbines, visible from the Amalfi Coast.

The plant, which was established in February 2004, features ten wind turbines (model V52) of 850 kW each producing more than 20 million kWh per year. The wind farm has been designed and developed by the IWT (Italian Wind Technology) headed the Danish multinational Vestas.

== Twin towns ==
- Thrakomakedones (Greece)
