= Aquara =

- Comune
- Comune di Aquara
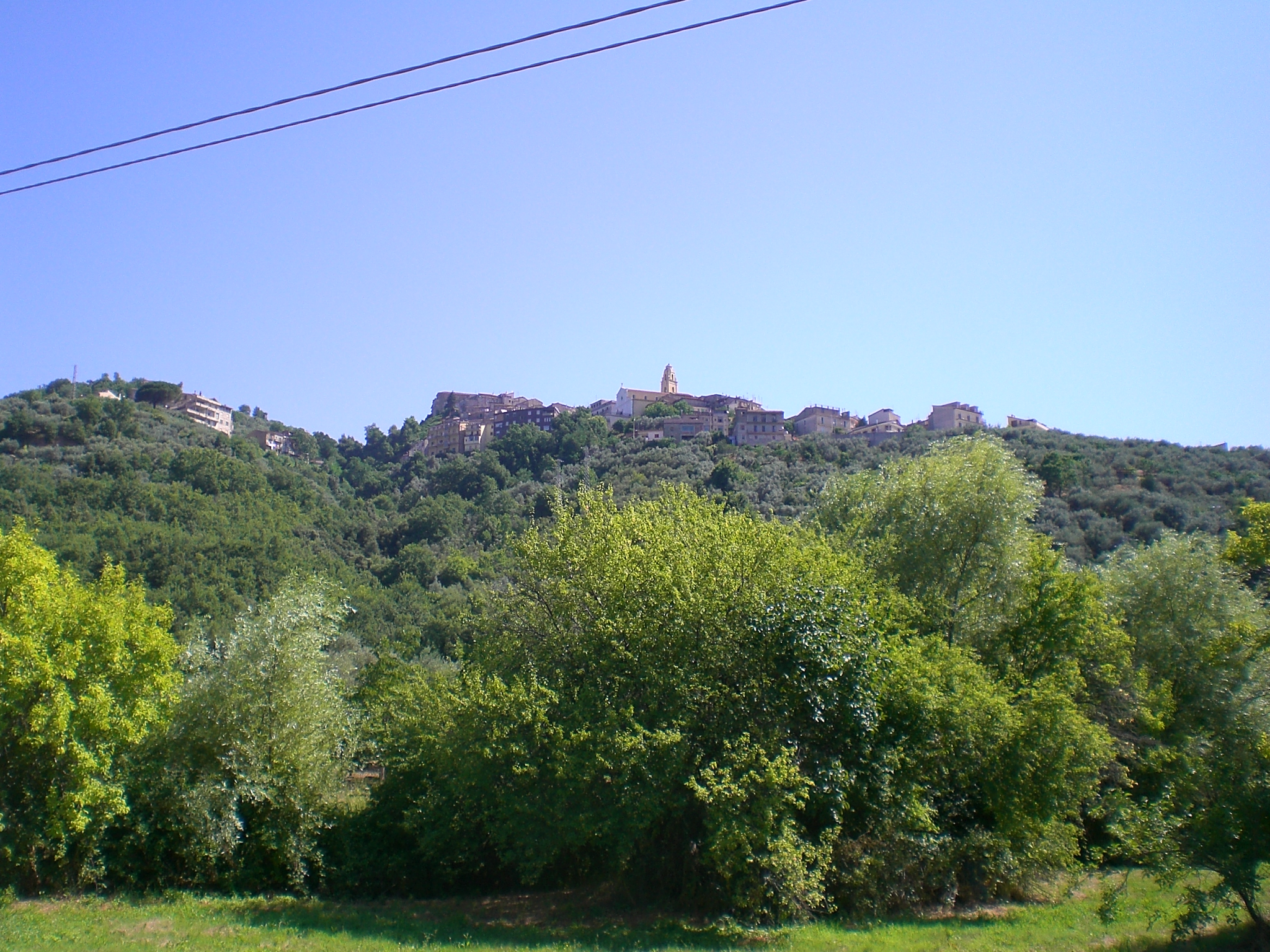
- View of Aquara from the valley

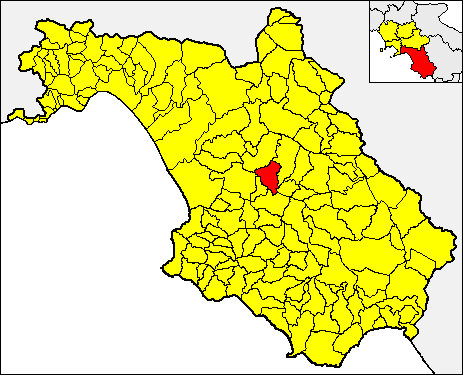
- Aquara within the Province of Salerno

- Location of Aquara in Italy Aquara (Campania)
- Coordinates: 40°26′36.85″N 15°15′16.16″E
- Country: Italy
- Region: Campania
- Province: Salerno (SA)
- Frazioni: Mainardi

Government
  - Mayor: Antonio Marino

Area
  - Total: 32.73 km^{2} (12.64 sq mi)
- Elevation: 500 m (1,600 ft)

Population (31 December 2017)
  - Total: 1,476
  - Density: 45.10/km^{2} (116.8/sq mi)
- Demonym: Aquaresi
- Time zone: UTC+1 (CET)
  - Summer (DST): UTC+2 (CEST)
- Postal code: 84020
- Dialing code: 0828
- ISTAT code: 065008
- Patron saint: Saint Lucidus
- Saint day: 28 July
- Website: Official website

Aquara is a town and comune in the province of Salerno in the Campania region of south-western Italy.

== Geography ==
The town, located on a hill in the middle of Cilento and part of its national park, lies below the Alburni mountains. It is 9 km far from Ottati and Castel San Lorenzo, 13 from Roccadaspide, 14 from Castelcivita and 17 from its caves, and 78 from Salerno.

The municipality borders with Bellosguardo, Castel San Lorenzo, Castelcivita, Felitto, Ottati and Roccadaspide. It counts the hamlet (frazione) of Mainardi and the localities of Casalicchio, Madonna del Piano and Ponte Calore. The last one is administratively shared with Castel San Lorenzo and located by the river Calore Lucano, that constitutes the western boundary of Aquara's municipal territory.

== History ==
Aquara has Roman origins, such as testified by some ruins of a Roman villa in Madonna del Piano. It was first mentioned in the 11th century, and counts among his vassals, Guglielmo Sanseverino and Ettore Fieramosca.

== People ==
- Saint Lucidus of Aquara (10th Century-1038), Benedectine monk and patron saint
- Ettore Fieramosca (1476–1515), condottiero and vassal of Aquara

== See also ==
- Cilentan dialect
- Castelcivita Caves
