= Corleto Monforte =

- Comune
- Comune di Corleto Monforte
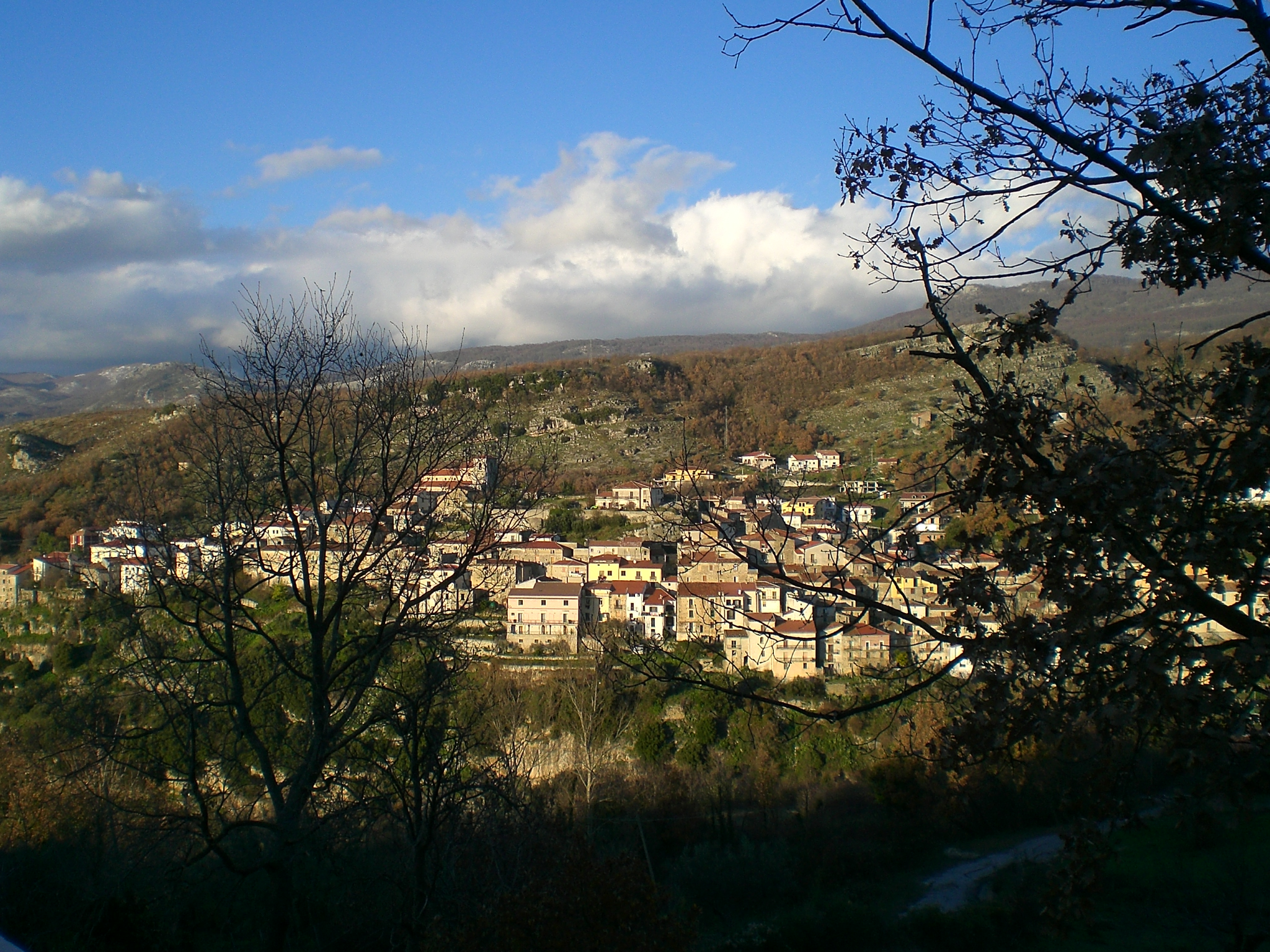
- View of the old town

- Coat of arms

- Location within Italy Location within Campania
- Coordinates: 40°26′N 15°22′E
- Country: Italy
- Region: Campania
- Province: Salerno (SA)
- Frazioni: Carnale

Government
  - Mayor: Filippo Ferraro (since October 2021) (Civic list)

Area
  - Total: 58.97 km^{2} (22.77 sq mi)
- Elevation: 628 m (2,060 ft)

Population (January 1, 2026)
  - Total: 462
  - Density: 7.83/km^{2} (20.3/sq mi)
- Demonym: Corletani
- Time zone: UTC+1 (CET)
  - Summer (DST): UTC+2 (CEST)
- Postal code: 84020
- Dialing code: 0828
- ISTAT code: 065048
- Patron saint: St. Barbara
- Saint day: July 10
- Website: Official website

Corleto Monforte (Campanian: Curlète) is a town and comune in the province of Salerno, in the Campania region of southern Italy. It lies on the southern slopes of the Alburni massif, entirely within the Cilento, Vallo di Diano and Alburni National Park.

The comune had 462 residents as of January 1, 2026, across a territory of almost 59 square kilometers (23 sq mi), giving it one of the lowest population densities in Campania. Its population has fallen by roughly four fifths since the first Italian census of 1861.

== Etymology ==
The name is generally derived from the Latin coryletum, "hazel grove" (Corylus avellana), although an alternative derivation from cornetum, "dogwood grove" (Cornus mas), has also been proposed; earlier documented forms of the toponym are Cornito and Corneto. The qualifier "Monforte" was adopted only in the nineteenth century and is attributed to the Monforte family, which exercised jurisdiction locally. A folk etymology instead connects it to the Latin mons fortis, "strong mountain", in reference to the fortified site.

Francesco Torre, in Cenni storici di Corleto Monforte (1893), reviewed the competing theories then current:

The first title given to Corleto, as is found in historical documents, was 'Cornito,' which became 'Corneto' over time [...] Some believe that Cornito, or Corneto, derives from cor nitidum; others from the fact that the estate was abundant in horned animals; and, finally, others maintain that the town was called Cornito on account of the cornus arbor, as there were forests of dogwood in the area. [...] The reason for which Corneto was changed to Corleto with the turn of the centuries, we do not know. Thanks only to the aid of philology and tradition are we able to posit that the Corletani, on account of a joyful heart, named their town cor laetum, and this too explains the fact that Corleto uses a heart on its crest. (Note: Original text: "La prima denominazione data a Corleto fu, come rilevasi da documenti antichi, Cornito, che in prosieguo diventò Corneto, per uno di que' semplici mutamenti, che si verificano in altri nomi di città e paesi. Varii sono i pareri intorno all'origine di questa denominazione. Taluni vogliono che Cornito, o Corneto, derivasse da cor nitidum, altri dal fatto che il suo tenimento era ricco di animali cornuti; e altri, infine, sostengono che il paese fu detto Cornito, da cornus arbor, imperocché vi erano delle selve di alberi corniole. [...] La ragione per la quale Corneto fu col volgersi dei secoli cambiato in Corleto, da noi non si sa. Solo mercé l'aiuto della filologia e della tradizione, siamo in grado di poter affermare che i Corletani perché di cuore allegro, chiamarono Corleto il loro paese da cor laetum, e di ciò sia pruova anco il fatto che Corleto ha per emblema il cuore.")

To distinguish the town from Corleto Perticara in Basilicata, the suffix "a Fasanella" had been appended to its name. Following a ministerial agreement of June 30, 1862, the town council resolved on November 18 of the same year to replace it with "Monforte".

== Geography ==
Corleto Monforte lies in the northeastern part of the Cilento, at the foot of the Alburni and adjoining the Bosco di Corleto. The historic center, which accounts for almost the whole of the built-up area, occupies a limestone spur flanked by the Rapi and Palata torrents and overlooking the valley of the Fasanella. The comune's territory ranges in elevation from 323 to 1,451 meters (1,060 to 4,760 ft) above sea level, with the town hall at 628 meters (2,060 ft).

Neighboring comuni are Sant'Angelo a Fasanella, Roscigno, Sacco, San Rufo, San Pietro al Tanagro, Sant'Arsenio, and Petina. The town is served by the SS 166 to the south and by a provincial road linking it to Ottati and Sant'Angelo a Fasanella and continuing toward Postiglione and the Castelcivita Caves.

The only frazione is Carnale, a scattered settlement of houses and farmsteads.

The Bosco di Corleto is a forested area of roughly 3,500 hectares (8,600 acres) on the southwestern Alburni, composed mainly of beech with stands of silver fir. It extends toward the Passo della Sentinella and is contiguous with the woodland of Pruno to the south. The European wildcat is among the characteristic species of the surrounding woodland.

== History ==
=== Origins and Middle Ages ===
Local tradition holds that the settlement was founded by the Lucanians between the fifth and fourth centuries BC, sited on its rocky ridge in order to command the Fasanella valley and the neighboring settlements of Monte Pruno and Fasanella. Remains of a Roman and Lucanian settlement survive at the locality of Piano del Bue, about six kilometers (4 mi) from the town, and rural structures have been identified at Timpa degli Antichi on the boundary with Sacco.

The town was walled during the eleventh century, with two southern gates known as Lumana, demolished in 1953, and Capo delle Armi. During the baronial revolt against Frederick II in 1246, imperial troops laid waste to the estates of those implicated in the conspiracy after the fall of Capaccio. A local tradition relates that, after twenty days of siege, the Corletani hurled cheese rather than stones at the besiegers to demonstrate that their provisions were undiminished, prompting the imperial commander to withdraw.

=== Feudal period ===
The fief, recorded in medieval sources as Terra Corneti, was held in the fourteenth century by the Sanseverino family, counts of Caiazzo, and a boundary inventory of 1318 later served to settle a long-running border dispute with Sant'Angelo a Fasanella. In 1457 Ferrante of Aragon assigned Corneto, together with Albanella, Campora, Felitto, Persano, and Roscigno, to Roberto Sanseverino d'Aragona, who took possession the following year.

Confiscated for felony in 1528, the fief was bought in 1530 by Camillo Pignatelli, count of Borrello, before returning to the Sanseverino, who sold it on. It changed hands repeatedly over the following century, passing through the Soria, Arcamone, Zurlo, Lucio, Pescara, Cosco, and Della Marra families, and was acquired at auction in 1606. It was sold to Duke Giacomo Galeota in 1667, and the Capece Galeota still held it at the end of the eighteenth century.

=== Administrative history ===
Following the abolition of feudalism, from 1811 to 1860 Corleto belonged to the circondario of Sant'Angelo a Fasanella, within the district of Campagna in the province of Principato Citeriore, Kingdom of the Two Sicilies.

After the unification of Italy the comune formed part of the mandamento of Sant'Angelo a Fasanella, in the circondario of Campagna within the newly created province of Salerno. The circondario was suppressed in 1926 and its territory transferred to that of Salerno; the circondari were abolished throughout Italy the following year.

== Demographics ==
The comune reached its demographic peak in 1871 and has declined almost continuously since, a pattern common to the interior comuni of the Alburni and driven principally by emigration.

Historical population
Year	Pop.	±%
1861	2,111	—
1871	2,269	+7.5%
1881	2,000	−11.9%
1901	1,546	−22.7%
1911	1,471	−4.9%
1921	1,348	−8.4%
1931	1,398	+3.7%
1936	1,457	+4.2%
1951	1,546	+6.1%
1961	1,473	−4.7%
1971	1,196	−18.8%
1981	1,146	−4.2%
1991	965	−15.8%
2001	764	−20.8%
2011	643	−15.8%
Source: ISTAT censuses

The resident population was 462 as of January 1, 2026.

== Main sights ==
=== Churches ===
The parish church of St. Barbara stands on Piazza Diana, so named after a temple of Diana traditionally held to have occupied the site and, after the spread of Christianity, to have been converted into a church dedicated to St. Maria dell'Elice. The present building was raised between 1750 and 1762 and has borne its current dedication since the latter year. It has three naves on a Latin cross plan; the polychrome marble high altar, brought from the church of Sant'Andrea in Auletta, was installed in 1814, and the monumental organ above the entrance tribune is the work of the Carelli workshop. The detached bell tower, built on the rock at the edge of the square, dates from 1825.

The church of San Giovanni Battista, in the highest part of the town, was built in 1568, although the architrave of the main door bears the date 1797. The half-length statue of the saint was bought in Naples in December 1719 and carried to Corleto by mule; it was restored in 1850 and again in 1934. The feast on June 24 is distinguished by a procession in which four further statues accompany that of St. John.

The church of the Rosario, rebuilt in 1712, holds several paintings of note, including an eighteenth-century Virgin of the Rosary with the Fifteen Mysteries on the high altar and a Virgin between Saints Lawrence and Francis of 1676.

The small church of St. Theodore stands at Capo delle Armi and preserves a stone portal of the thirteenth century. Local tradition assigns its foundation to about AD 500 and holds that the site was previously used for pre-Christian worship. It commands a wide view over the valley below.

=== Other sites ===
The old town has been restored and provided with waymarked routes. Its western end, at the tip of the ravine, forms a terraced belvedere known as Capo delle Armi, the first stronghold from which attackers could be repelled; an unexplored cave, thought to extend for more than 1,300 meters (4,300 ft) beneath the built-up area, opens below it. Other features include a medieval tower beside the town hall and the Renaissance portal of Casa Ferraro.

== Culture ==
=== Museo naturalistico degli Alburni ===
The Museo naturalistico degli Alburni, inaugurated on August 6, 1997, occupies a palazzo in the historic center. It grew from the private collection donated by the zoologist Camillo Pignataro, editor of the journal Il Naturalista Campano, and is administered by the Fondazione I.RI.DI.A. (Istituto di Ricerca e Didattica Ambientale).

The permanent displays comprise more than 1,300 vertebrates and over 20,000 invertebrates of European and exotic fauna, including some 530 European bird species, more than 60 mammal species, and a collection of Mediterranean decapod crustaceans. The museum also functions as a center for faunal monitoring and research, with a teaching laboratory, a conference room, and a faunistic library.

=== Festivals and cuisine ===
The feast of St. Barbara, patron of the town, was formerly kept on December 4, the saint's universal feast day. In 1919 the clergy moved the local celebration to July 10 for economic reasons, and it has been held on that date since.

Other recurring events include the Festa del caciocavallo podolico e della transumanza, held in late June and centered on the seasonal movement of livestock, and the Festa della montagna in high pasture during the summer. Local produce includes caciocavallo podolico, sheep and goat cheeses, and ricotta; a characteristic dish is the savory pie known locally as pizza chiena, associated with Easter.

== Economy ==
The economy is predominantly agricultural and pastoral, as in the other comuni of the Fasanella valley. Much of the territory lies above 800 meters (2,600 ft) and is poorly suited to arable farming, so stock rearing and dairying, together with woodland resources, have historically predominated.
