= Castel San Lorenzo =

- Comune
- Comune di Castel San Lorenzo
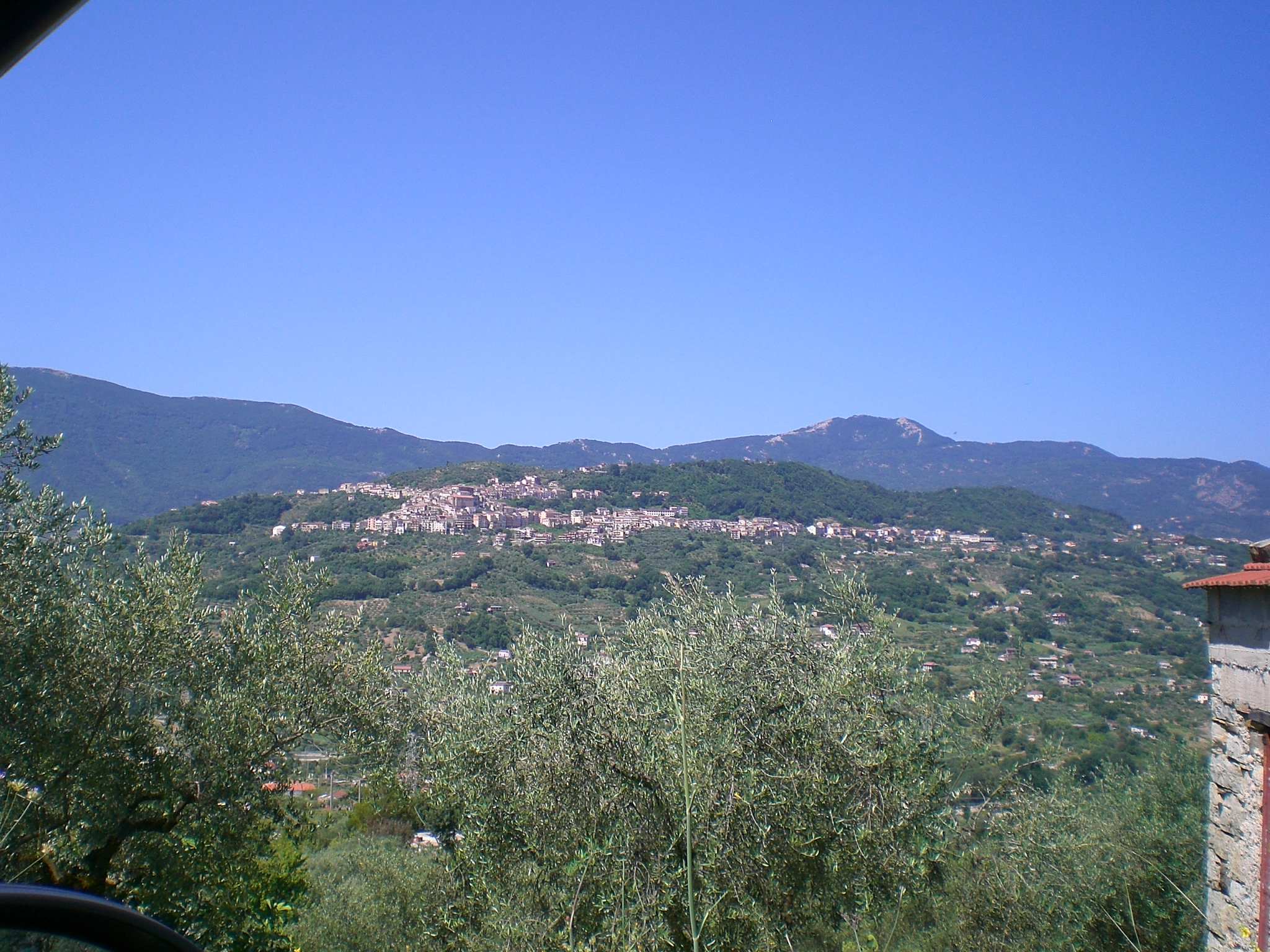

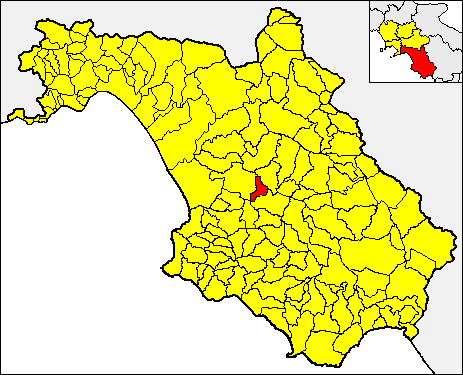

- Location within Italy Location within Campania
- Coordinates: 40°25′N 15°14′E
- Country: Italy
- Region: Campania
- Province: Salerno (SA)

Area
  - Total: 14 km^{2} (5.4 sq mi)
- Elevation: 350 m (1,150 ft)

Population (1 May 2009)
  - Total: 2,723
  - Density: 190/km^{2} (500/sq mi)
- Demonym: Castellesi
- Time zone: UTC+1 (CET)
  - Summer (DST): UTC+2 (CEST)
- Postal code: 84049
- Dialing code: 0828
- ISTAT code: 065035
- Patron saint: San Giovanni Battista
- Saint day: 24 June
- Website: Official website

Castel San Lorenzo (Cilentan: Castieddu) is a town and comune in the province of Salerno in the Campania region of south-western Italy.

== Geography ==
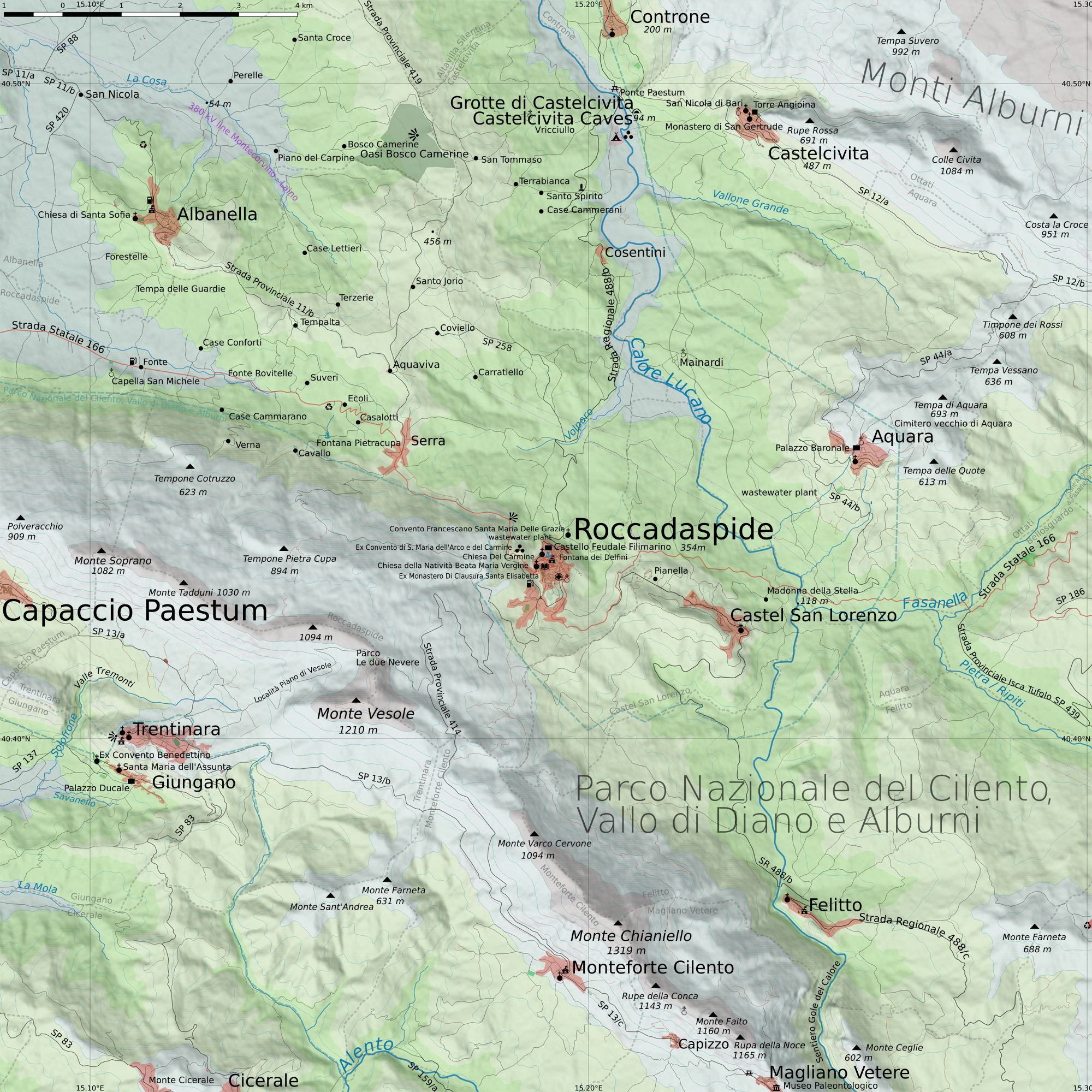
Map of Roccadaspide and Castel San Lorenzo

The municipality, located in the middle of Cilento, borders with Aquara, Roccadaspide and Felitto. It counts no proper hamlets (frazioni) but several minor localities, that are Annunziata, Concezione, Farneta, Fontana dell'Elice, Galdo, Galloppole, Genzano, Infetina, Insertone, Madonna della Stella, Olivella, Palmento, Parretta, Pianella, Piano della Macchia, Pisciolo, Ponte Calore, Tempa, Tempa delle Monache and Tempa Giardino.

The town of Castel San Lorenzo lies upon a hill above the Calore Lucano river, not too far from the Alburni mountain range. It is far 30 km from Paestum, 38 from Agropoli and 68 from Salerno.

== Castel San Lorenzo DOC ==
Italian wine, both red, white and rose, under the Castel San Lorenzo DOC appellation comes from this area. Grapes destined for DOC production must be harvested up to a maximum yield of 12 tonnes/hectare with the finished wines fermented to a minimum alcohol level of 11.5% for reds and 11% for whites.

Red and rose Castel San Lorenzo is produced from 60 to 80% Barbera, 20-30% Sangiovese with other local grape varieties (both red and white) permitted to make up to 10% of the blend. Whites are a blend of 50-60% Trebbiano, 30-40% Malvasia with other local varieties permitted up 20%. Two separate varietal wines made from Barbera and Moscato are permitted to be made under the Castel San Lorenzo DOC provided that they each constitute at least 85% of the wine and are fermented to a minimum alcohol level of 12.5% and 12%, respectively. In the case of Barbera, a separate Riserva wine can also be designated if the wine is aged at least 2 years prior to release. If the Moscato is made entirely from the local Moscato Lambiccato clone, a separate dessert wine under that label can be produced within the DOC if the wine attains a minimum alcohol level of 13.5%.
