= Castelcivita =

- Comune
- Comune di Castelcivita
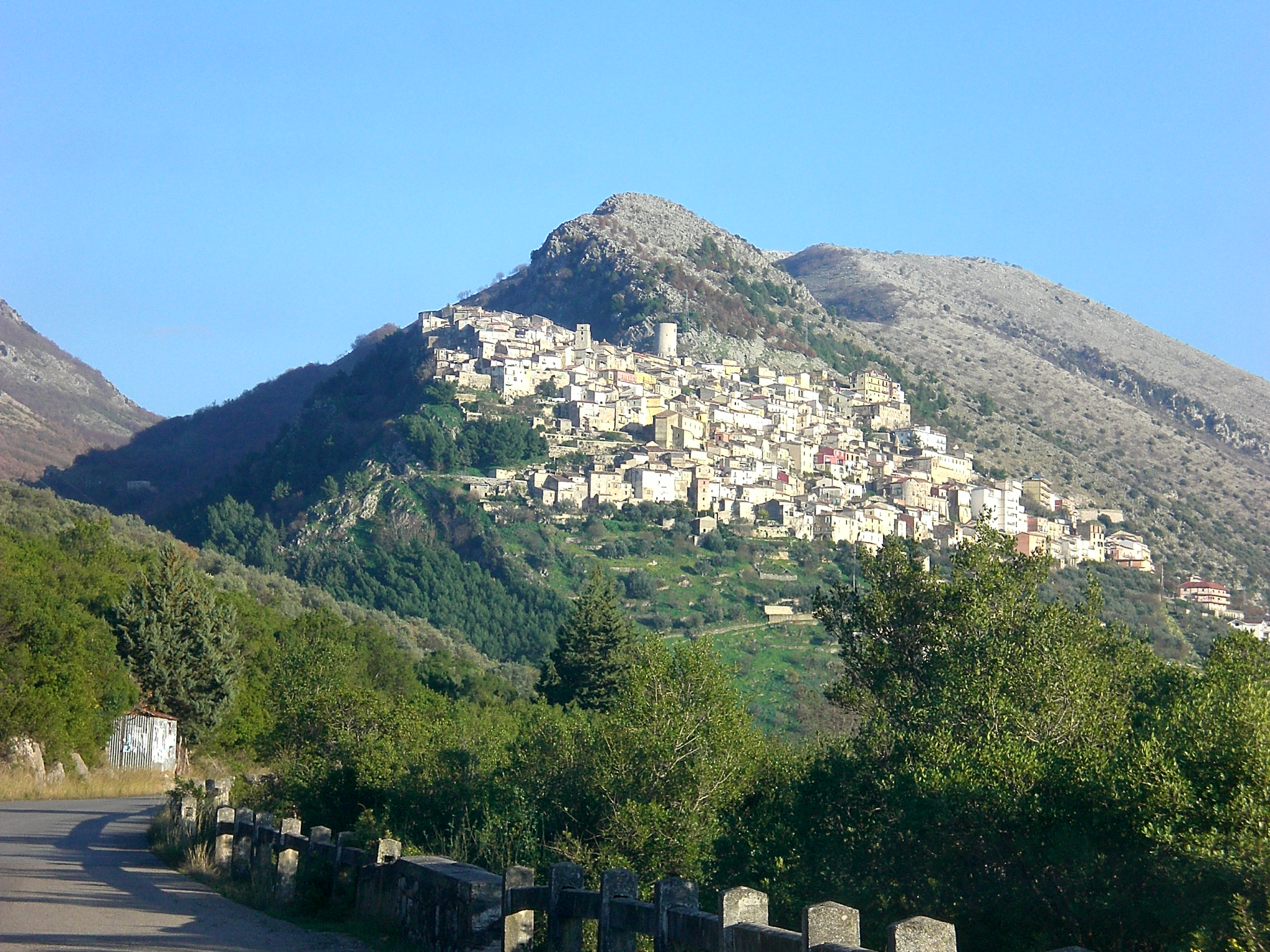
- Panoramic view

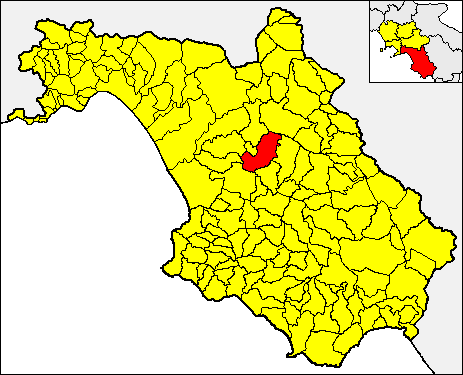
- Castelcivita within the Province of Salerno

- Location of Castelcivita in Italy Castelcivita (Campania)
- Coordinates: 40°29′N 15°14′E
- Country: Italy
- Region: Campania
- Province: Salerno (SA)
- Frazioni: Cosentini, Pantano-Serracchio, Serra

Government
  - Mayor: Antonio Forziati

Area
  - Total: 57 km^{2} (22 sq mi)
- Elevation: 487 m (1,598 ft)

Population (28 February 2017)
  - Total: 1,678
  - Density: 29/km^{2} (76/sq mi)
- Demonym: Castelcivitesi
- Time zone: UTC+1 (CET)
  - Summer (DST): UTC+2 (CEST)
- Postal code: 84020
- Dialing code: 0828
- ISTAT code: 065030
- Patron saint: St. Cono, St. Nicholas of Bari
- Saint day: June 3, December 6
- Website: Official website

Castelcivita (Cilentan: A Castellucce) is a town and comune in the province of Salerno in the Campania region of south-western Italy.

== Geography ==
The town is situated in the middle of Cilento, by the western side of the Alburni mountains, and its territory is part of the Cilento and Vallo di Diano National Park. Neighboring municipalities are Albanella, Altavilla Silentina, Aquara, Controne (the nearest town), Ottati, Postiglione, Roccadaspide and Sicignano degli Alburni. The municipalities counts the hamlets (frazioni) of Cosentini, Pantano-Serracchio and Serra.

== Main sights ==
Castelcivita is home to the popular tourist attraction, the Castelcivita Caves (Grotte di Castelcivita), located 1.5 kilometres (0.93 mi) in the valley, by the river Calore.

== See also ==
- Cilento
- Cilentan dialect
