= Sicignano =

Sicignano may refer to:

- Sicignano (surname), an Italian habitational surname that evolved from the Latin word Sicinianus
- Sicignano degli Alburni, a comune in the province of Salerno in the Campania region of southern Italy
- Vincenzo Sicignano, an Italian football (soccer) goalkeeper
