= Mandamento =

Mandamento may refer to:

- Mandamento (administrative district)
- Mandamento (Sicilian Mafia)

== See also ==
- Capomandamento
