= Ottati =

- Comune
- Comune di Ottati
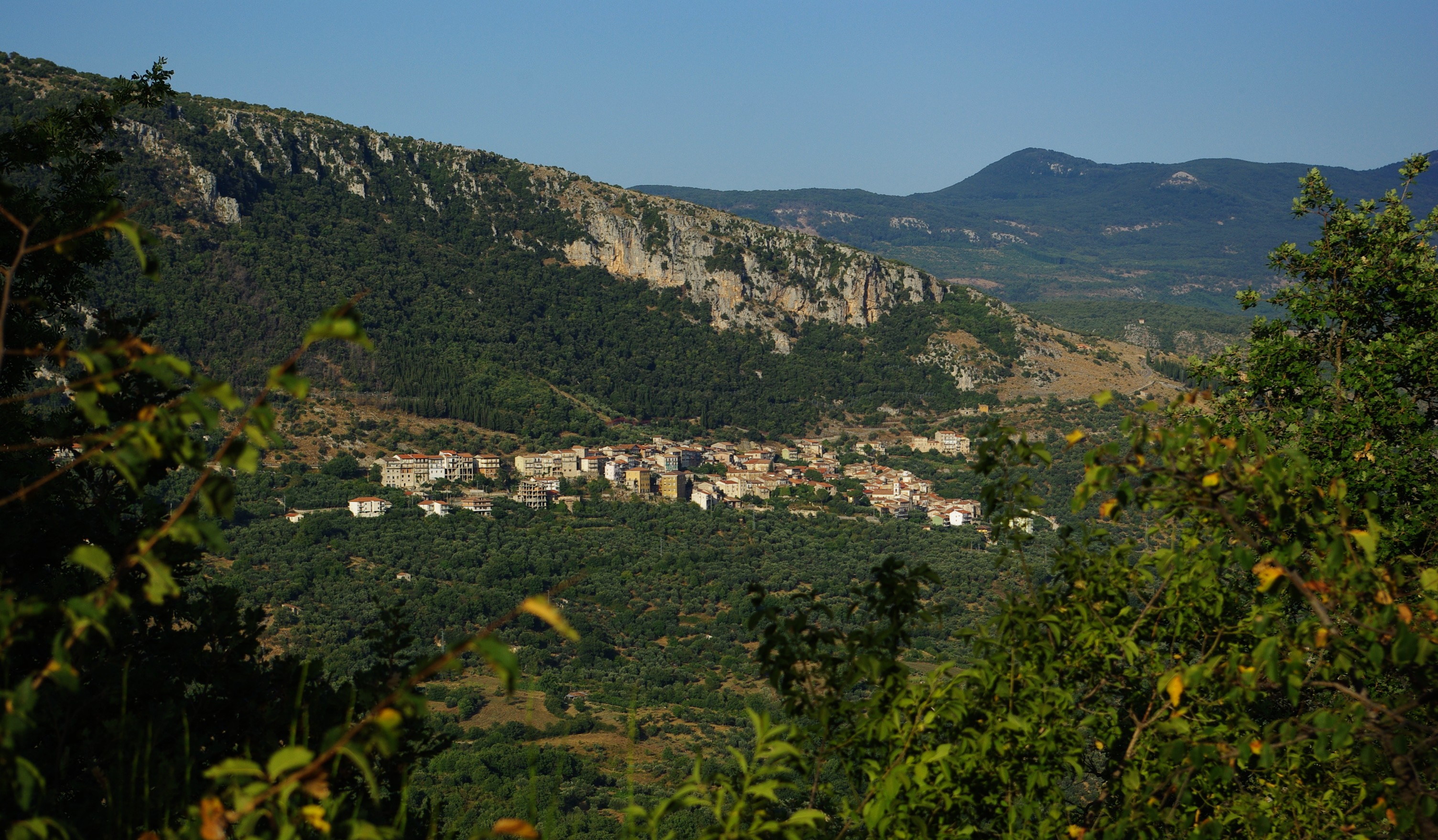

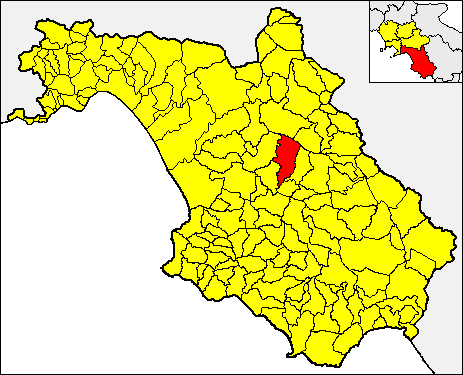
- Ottati within the Province of Salerno

- Location within Italy Location within Campania
- Coordinates: 40°27′46.22″N 15°18′54.47″E
- Country: Italy
- Region: Campania
- Province: Salerno (SA)

Area
  - Total: 53 km^{2} (20 sq mi)
- Elevation: 529 m (1,736 ft)

Population (31 December 2011)
  - Total: 680
  - Density: 13/km^{2} (33/sq mi)
- Demonym: Ottatesi
- Time zone: UTC+1 (CET)
  - Summer (DST): UTC+2 (CEST)
- Postal code: 84020
- Dialing code: 0828
- Website: Official website

UNESCO World Heritage Site
- Part of: Cilento and Vallo di Diano National Park with the Archeological Sites of Paestum and Velia, and the Certosa di Padula
- Criteria: Cultural: (iii)(iv)
- Reference: 842-001
- Inscription: 1998 (22nd Session)

Ottati (Cilentan: Utatte) is a town and comune in the province of Salerno in the Campania region of south-west Italy. As of 2011 its population was 680.

== History ==
The town was founded in the 12th century, presumably by shepherds who had abandoned the ancient village of Fasanella.

== Geography ==
Located in Cilento and part of its national park, Ottati lies below Tempa del Prato mountain (1,048 m), part of the Alburni range. It is crossed in the middle by the provincial road SP 179 and the town hall is located in Via 24 Maggio 53. It is 3 km from Sant'Angelo a Fasanella, 7 km from Corleto Monforte, 8 km from Aquara, 9 km from Castelcivita, and 92 km from the city of Salerno.

The municipality borders Aquara, Bellosguardo, Castelcivita, Petina, Sant'Angelo a Fasanella and Sicignano degli Alburni. It has no hamlets (frazioni), but includes the localities of Bivio San Vito and Chiaie, comprising a few scattered farmhouses.

== Demographics ==
The municipality of Ottati had a population of 998 inhabitants according to the results of the National Census conducted in 1991. After the National Census of 2001 the population was officially stated to be 809 inhabitants, thereby showing a reduction of 18.94% between 1991 and 2001. The inhabitants were distributed in 345 families with an average of 2,34 people per family.

== Economy ==
There are six industrial firms employing 16 people (14.16% of the total of the workers), 21 service firms employing 22 people (19.47% of the total of the workers), 26 firms employing 66 people (58.41% of the total of the workers), and two administrative offices employing nine workers (7.96% of the total of the workers). There is a total of 113 workers, who are 13.97% of the inhabitants of the municipality.

== Gallery ==
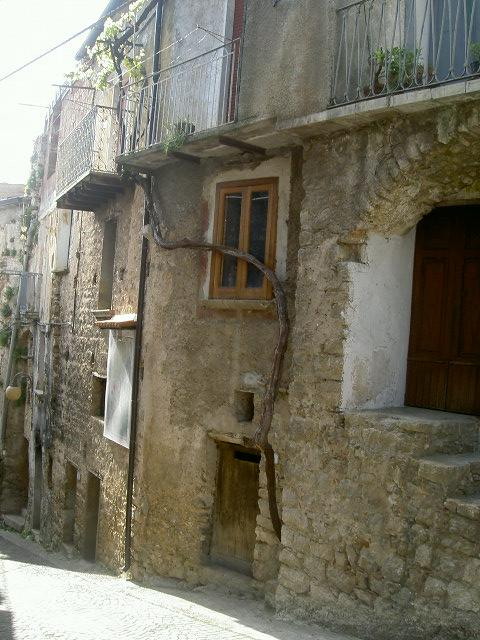
View of a street in the old town

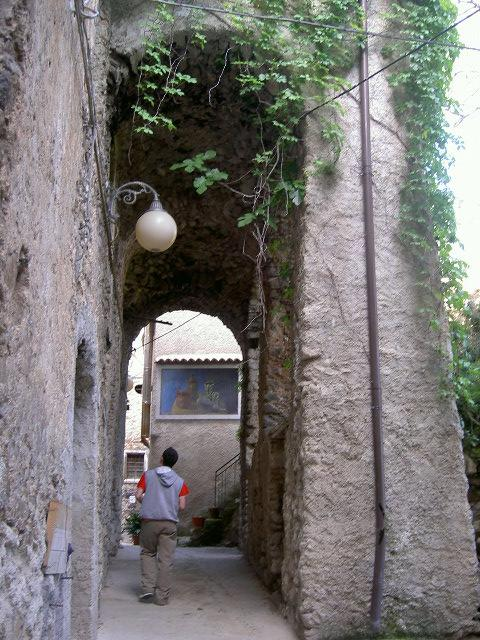
View of an ancient arch in the old town

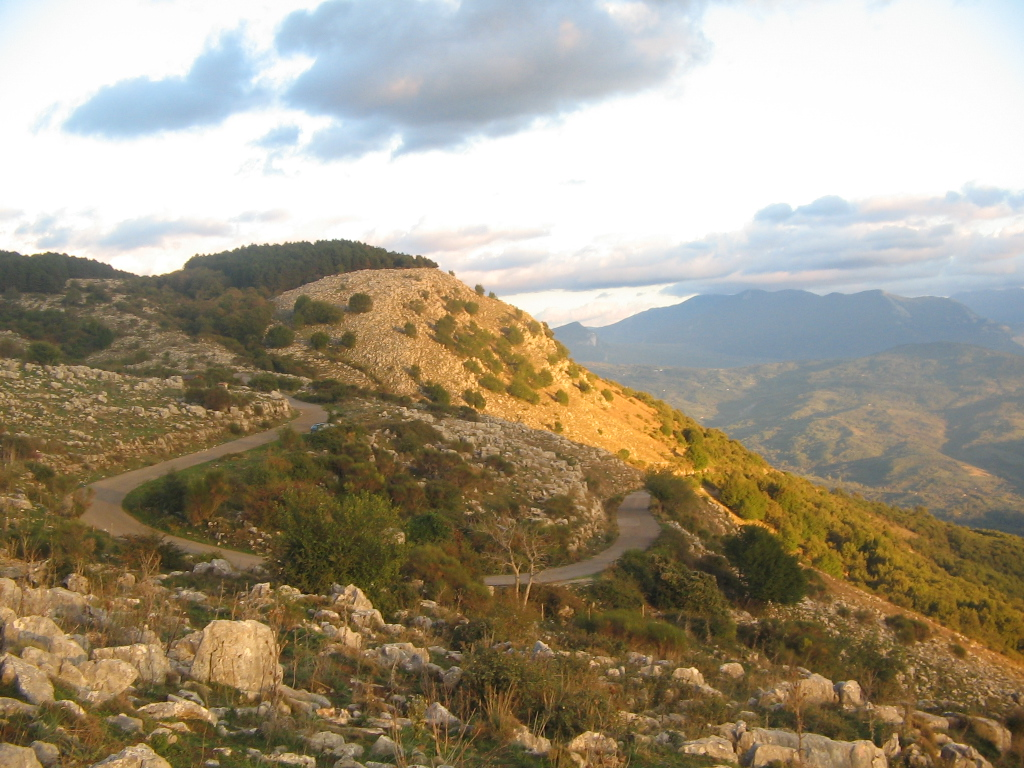
The mountain road to Tempa del Prato mountain, above Ottati

== See also ==
- Cilentan dialect
- Castelcivita Caves
