= Altavilla Silentina =

- Comune
- Comune di Altavilla Silentina
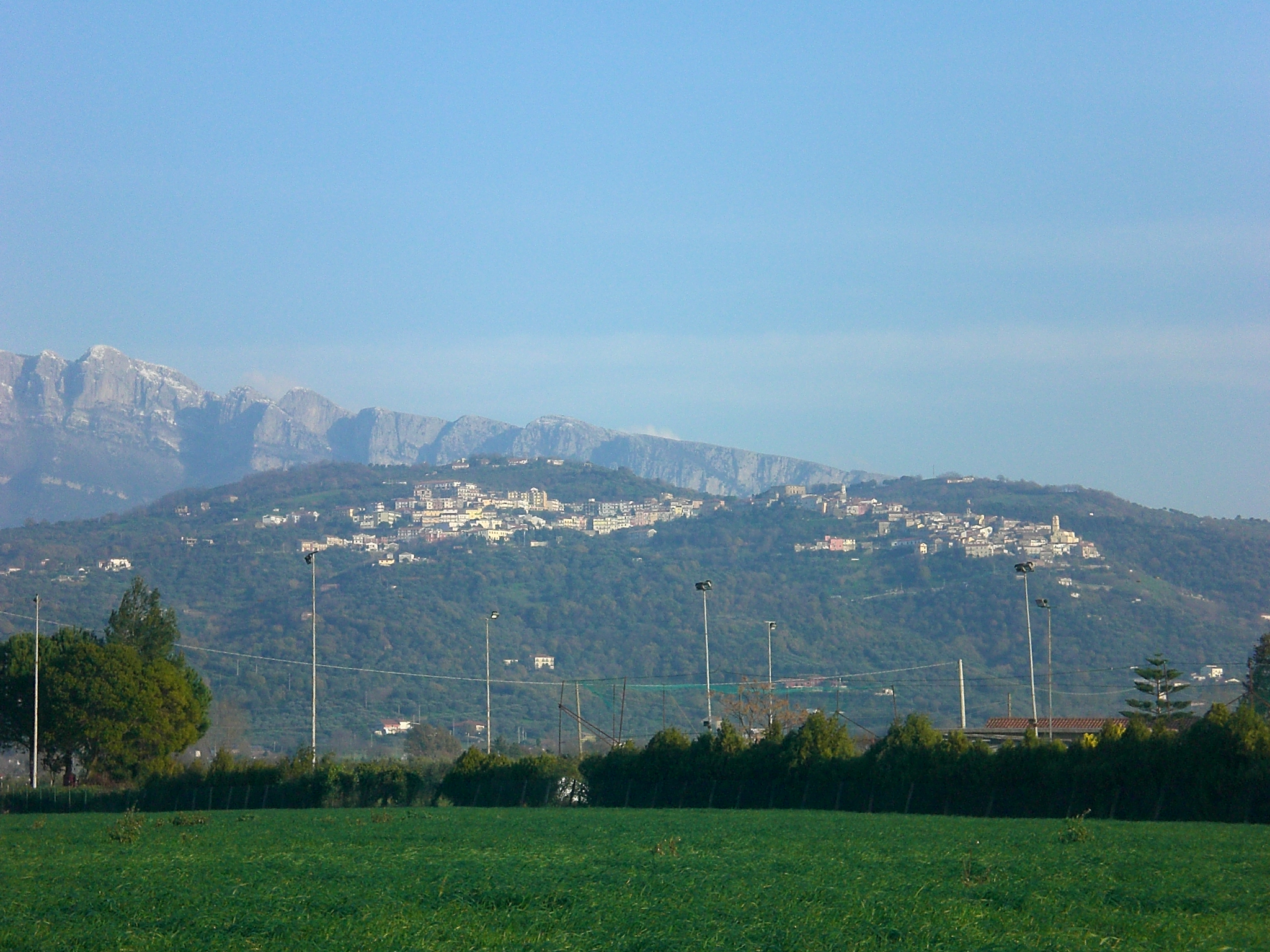

- Coat of arms

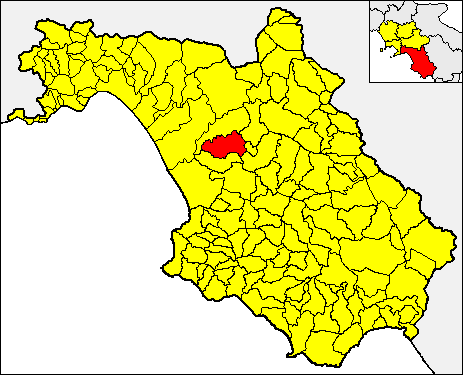
- Altavilla Silentina within the Province of Salerno

- Location of Altavilla Silentina in Italy Altavilla Silentina (Campania)
- Coordinates: 40°32′N 15°8′E
- Country: Italy
- Region: Campania
- Province: Salerno (SA)
- Frazioni: Borgo Carillia, Cerrelli, Cerrocupo, Olivella

Government
  - Mayor: Francesco Cembalo

Area
  - Total: 52.48 km^{2} (20.26 sq mi)
- Elevation: 275 m (902 ft)

Population (31-8-2022)
  - Total: 6,871
  - Density: 130.9/km^{2} (339.1/sq mi)
- Demonym: Altavillesi
- Time zone: UTC+1 (CET)
  - Summer (DST): UTC+2 (CEST)
- Postal code: 84045
- Dialing code: 0828
- ISTAT code: 065005
- Patron saint: Saint Giles
- Saint day: 1 September
- Website: Official website

Altavilla Silentina is a town and comune located in the province of Salerno, Campania, some 100 km south of Naples, Italy.

== Geography ==
Altavilla Silentina is spread on two ridges of a hill. It is shielded on the northeastern side by the Alburni Mountains and on the West looks at the plain of the Sele River and the Tyrrhenian Sea. The panorama includes the island of Capri, the mountains of the Amalfi Coast and the Gulf of Salerno in its northern part. The river Calore Salernitano touches much of its western boundaries.

== History ==
The territory of Altavilla has been populated since the 7th century BCE as demonstrated by archaeological finds on the territory, in the locality of San Lorenzo. In the nearby rural territory of Altavilla Silentina, by the Sele River, it is thought to have taken place the final battle where Spartacus and 60,000 fellow slaves who rebelled against the Roman Republic were definitely defeated by the Roman general Pompey in 71 BCE. A district of a nearby town is today called Pompeo.

The history of the modern Altavilla began around the year 1080 when the Normans with Robert Guiscard erected the Norman Castle that dominates the town and the Church of St. Giles. The town was built on triangular shape fortified with walls and three main gates: St. Blaise's Gate, Susa's Gate, Carina's Gate. The current name, Altavilla, derives from that of Guiscard's family, the Hauteville.

In 1246, having sided with the town of Capaccio and other local barons against the emperor Frederick II, Altavilla was completely razed to the ground. The breach was opened in a section of the old town that still today bears the nickname of muro rutto ("broken wall"). The city was newly built because of its strategic position dominating the plain of Sele River and was designed in a quadrangular shape, with the addition of a New Gate called "Portanova" (New Door).

During the 15th century the Franciscans arrived in Altavilla and built a two-storey convent with a center cloister, and around it they built a Church dedicated to St. Francis of Assisi, a refectory, a library and a parlor. The Franciscan remained in Altavilla until 1860, when with the Unification of Italy, many religious convent were confiscated.

On 9 September 1862, with a resolution of the town hall, Altavilla took the second name of 'Silentina' because located between the rivers Sele and Alento, in order to be recognized among the 5 other towns that in Italy bear the first name of Altavilla.

In World War II, it was the seat of clashes between the German occupation forces and Allied troops.

== Main sights ==
The oldest church is the Church of Saint Giles, founded by the Normans. It is situated on the high part of the Middle Ages section of the town. Since the Irpinia earthquake of 23 November 1980 the church has not been used for religious celebrations.

The Church of St. Blaise is located on the lower part of the medieval quarter of town, and gives the name to the Gate of St. Blaise, that was the entrance of the medieval village.

The main parish of Altavilla is located in the center of the old town, facing the Piazza Antico Sedile ("Ancient Seat square"), that was probably the "town hall" of the medieval Altavilla. The church was built in 1796 as written on the main inscription above St. Antoninus niche.

Other churches include:

- Convent of St. Francis
- Congrega of Our Lady of Mount Carmel
- Our Lady of Mount Virgin (cemetery chapel)
- Our Lady Assunta in St. Blaise (Cerrelli)
- Our Lady of Snow (Carillia)
- Newly built Church in Cerrocupo
