= Sant'Angelo a Fasanella =

- Comune
- Comune di Sant'Angelo a Fasanella
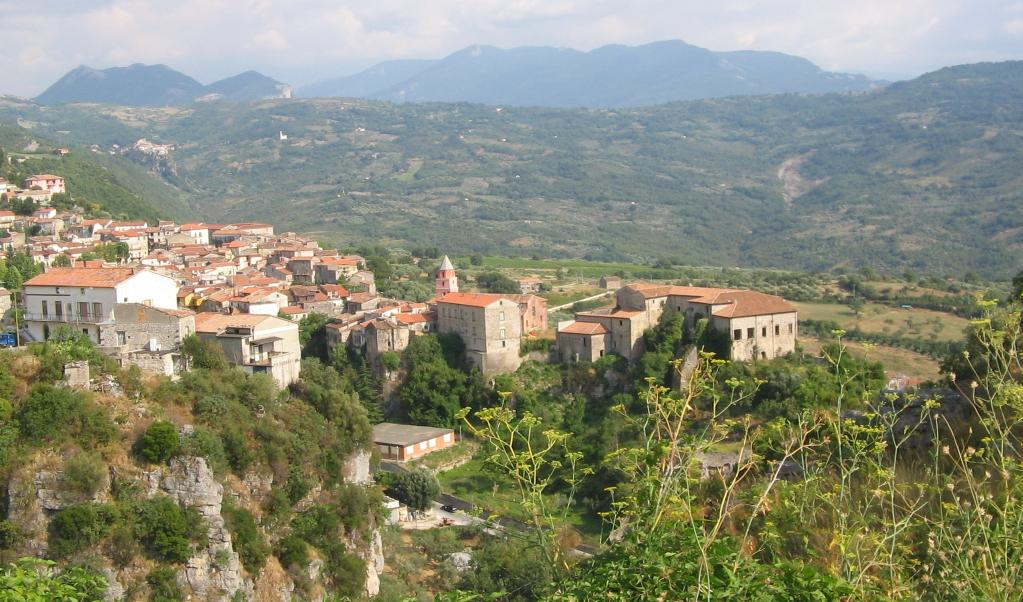
- Panoramic view

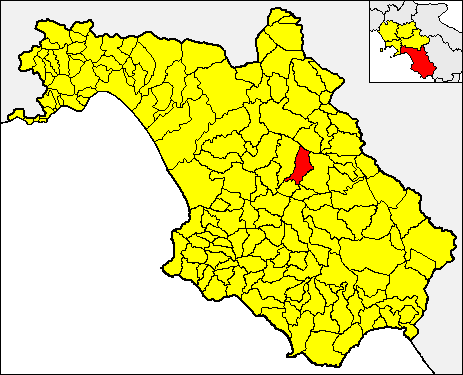
- Sant'Angelo a Fasanella within the Province of Salerno and Campania

- Location within Italy Location within Campania
- Coordinates: 40°27′N 15°21′E
- Country: Italy
- Region: Campania
- Province: Salerno (SA)

Government
  - Mayor: Gaspare Salamone

Area
  - Total: 32 km^{2} (12 sq mi)
- Elevation: 515 m (1,690 ft)

Population (31 December 2010)
  - Total: 730
  - Density: 23/km^{2} (59/sq mi)
- Demonym: Santangiolesi
- Time zone: UTC+1 (CET)
  - Summer (DST): UTC+2 (CEST)
- Postal code: 84027
- Dialing code: 0828
- Patron saint: Michael the Archangel
- Saint day: 29 September
- Website: Official website

Sant'Angelo a Fasanella is a town and comune in the province of Salerno in the Campania region of south-western Italy.

== Geography ==
The town is located in the north-east of Cilento, close to the mountain range of the Alburni. Its municipal territory is bordered by Bellosguardo, Corleto Monforte, Ottati, Petina and Roscigno.
