= Pertosa Caves =

Caves in Pertosa, Campania, Italy

Grotte di Pertosa (Pertosa Caves)
- Grotte di Pertosa-Auletta / Grotte dell'Angelo
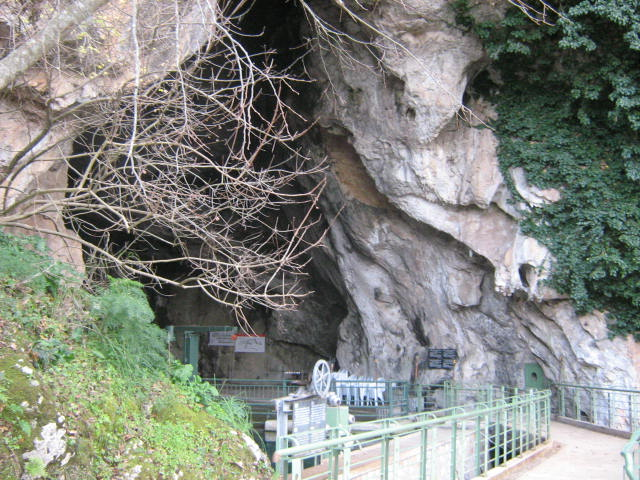
- Entrance to the caves

- Location within Italy
- Location: Pertosa (SA, Campania, Italy)
- Coordinates: 40°32′12.98″N 15°27′19.84″E
- Length: 3,000 m
- Elevation: 263 m
- Geology: Karst cave
- Entrances: 1
- Access: Public
- Show cave opened: 1932
- Show cave length: 1,200 m
- Website: Official website

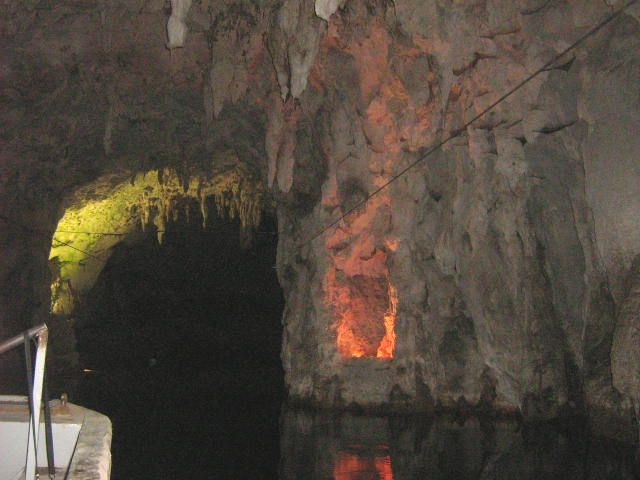
The underground lake.

The Pertosa Caves (Italian: Grotte di Pertosa), co-officially named Pertosa-Auletta Caves (Italian: Grotte di Pertosa-Auletta) since 2012, are a karst show cave system located in the municipality of Pertosa, in the province of Salerno, Campania, Italy.

== Overview ==
The caves, also named Grotte dell'Angelo as many Italian voids in honour of St. Michael, are extended also into the territories of Auletta and Polla.

They are situated by the eastern side of Alburni mountains, in the locality of Muraglione, 3 km (1.9 mi) in south of Pertosa and close to its railway station. Due to the presence of Tanagro river the caves are rich of water and, after the main entrance, there is an underground lake.

== Cinema ==
The caves were the set of some scenes of 1998 Italian horror film The Phantom of the Opera, directed by Dario Argento.

== See also ==
- Castelcivita Caves
- List of caves
- List of caves in Italy
