= Petina, Campania =

Petina
- Comune
- Comune di Petina
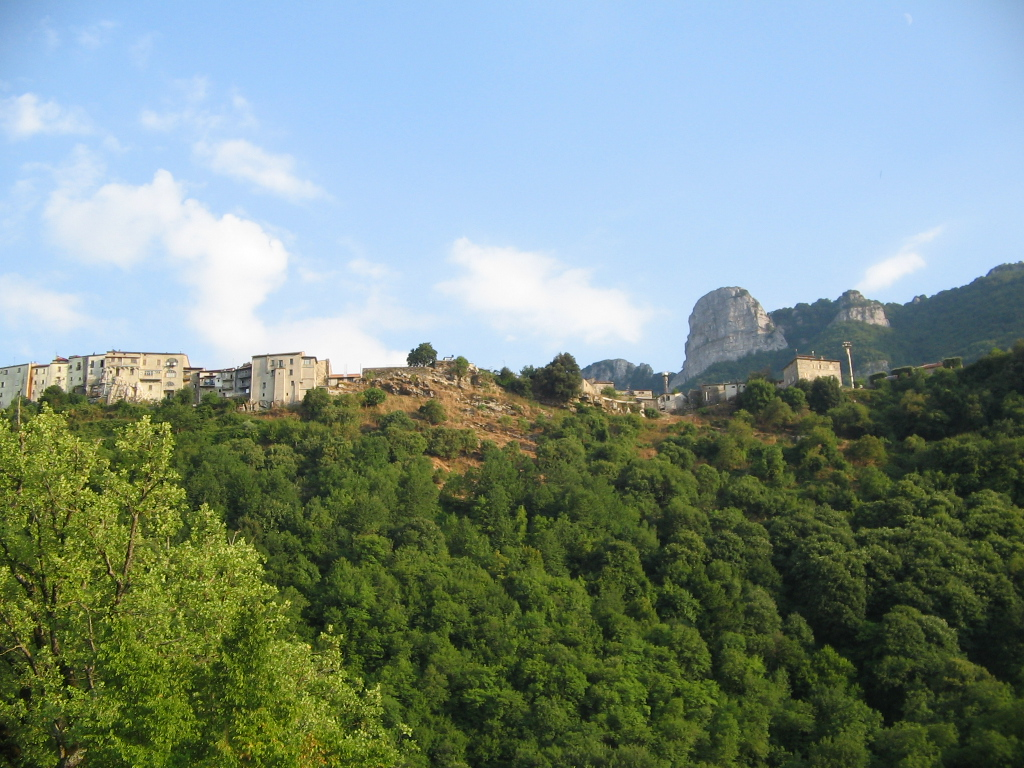
- View from below with a peak of the Alburni

- Location within Italy Location within Campania
- Coordinates: 40°32′N 15°22′E
- Country: Italy
- Region: Campania
- Province: Salerno (SA)
- Frazioni: Auletta, Corleto Monforte, Ottati, Sant'Angelo a Fasanella, Sicignano degli Alburni

Area
  - Total: 35.09 km^{2} (13.55 sq mi)
- Elevation: 649 m (2,129 ft)

Population (1 April 2009)
  - Total: 1,227
  - Density: 34.97/km^{2} (90.56/sq mi)
- Time zone: UTC+1 (CET)
  - Summer (DST): UTC+2 (CEST)
- Postal code: 84020
- Dialing code: 0828
- ISTAT code: 065094
- Patron saint: Sant'Onofrio
- Saint day: 2 August
- Website: Official website

Petina (Campanian: Appetine) is a town and comune in the province of Salerno in the Campania region of south-western Italy.

== Geography ==
The town is located on the Alburni mountain range, close to Basilicata region, and borders the municipalities of Auletta, Corleto Monforte, Ottati, Sant'Angelo a Fasanella and Sicignano degli Alburni.

It is served by the A2 motorway (exit "Petina") and counts a railway station on the Sicignano-Lagonegro line, a railway line closed in 1987 due to modernization works.
