= Auletta =

- Comune
- Comune di Auletta
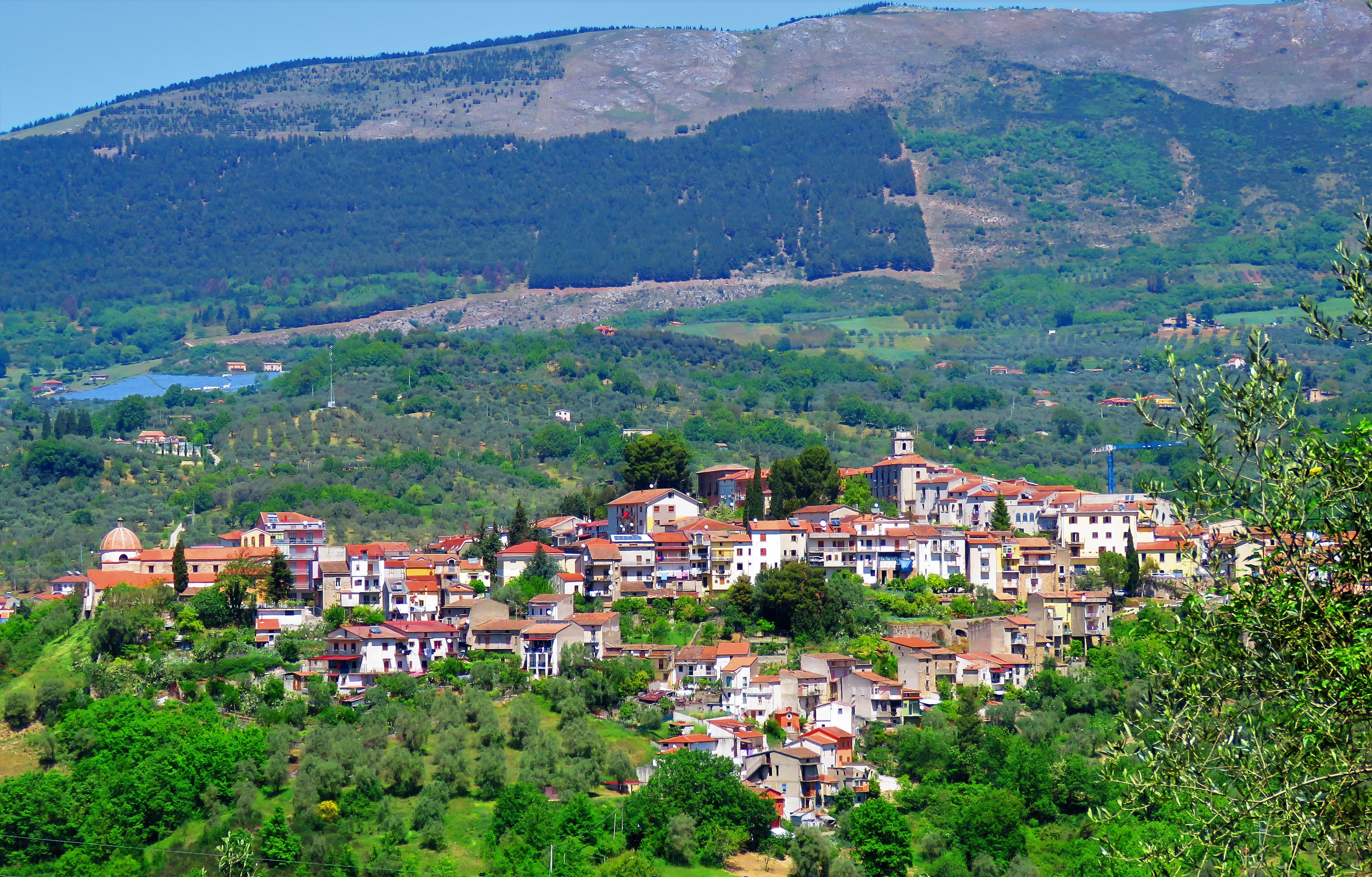
- Panorama

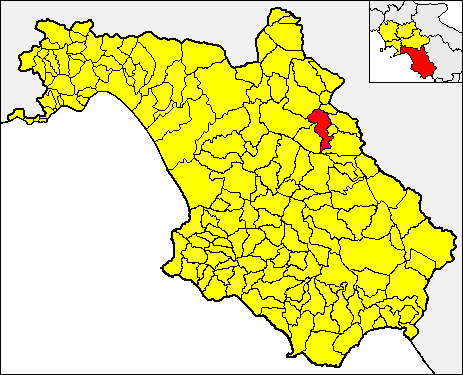
- Auletta within the Province of Salerno

- Location within Italy Location within Campania
- Coordinates: 40°33′40″N 15°25′28″E
- Country: Italy
- Region: Campania
- Province: Salerno (SA)
- Frazioni: Mattina, Tempe di Lizzi

Government
  - Mayor: Pietro Pessolano

Area
  - Total: 35 km^{2} (14 sq mi)
- Elevation: 280 m (920 ft)

Population (28 February 2017)
  - Total: 2,290
  - Density: 65/km^{2} (170/sq mi)
- Demonym: Aulettesi
- Time zone: UTC+1 (CET)
  - Summer (DST): UTC+2 (CEST)
- Postal code: 84031
- Dialing code: 0975
- ISTAT code: 065012
- Patron saint: St. Donatus
- Saint day: August 17
- Website: Official website

Auletta is a town and comune in the province of Salerno in the Campania region of south-western Italy.

== History ==
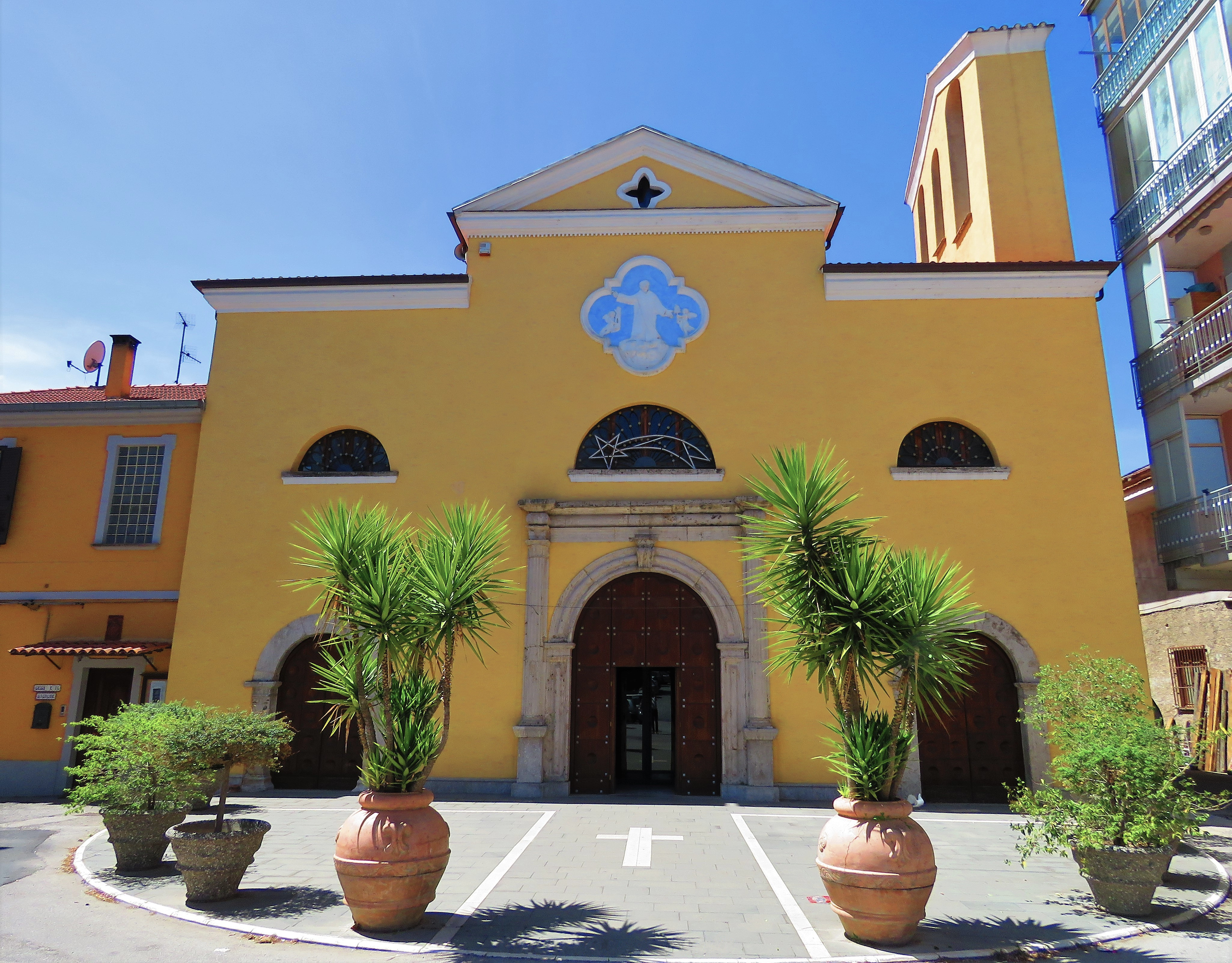
S. Nicola Di Mira church.

According to a legend retold by historian Giovan Battista Pacichelli, the name of Auletta would stem from Auleto, one of Aeneas' companions. Another suggested origin is olea, the Latin word for "oil", and the town is mentioned as Olibola in 1095 and Olivola in 1131.

Auletta was already fortified around the year 1000, the castle also being built in this period.

Immediately the Unification of Italy, in 1861, the population rose against the Piedmontese Regio Esercito troops. 45 local people were killed in what is remembered as the Massacro di Auletta ("Auletta Massacre"). In 1943 it was bombed by the Allied due to the presence of a battery of German guns.

== Geography ==
The bordering municipalities are Buccino, Caggiano, Corleto Monforte, Pertosa, Petina, Polla, Salvitelle and Sicignano degli Alburni.

== See also ==
- Pertosa Caves
- Alburni
- Cilento
- Vallo di Diano
