= Bellosguardo =

- Comune
- Comune di Bellosguardo
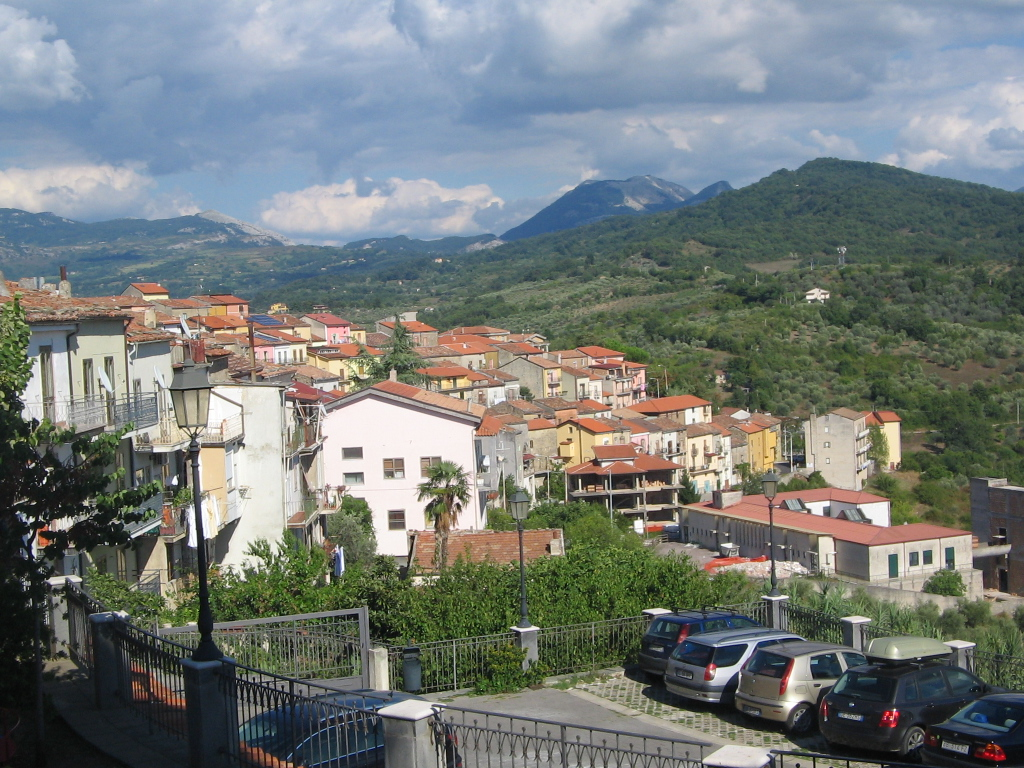
- View from Piazza XX Settembre

- Location within Italy Location within Campania
- Coordinates: 40°25′21.85″N 15°18′46.95″E
- Country: Italy
- Region: Campania
- Province: Salerno (SA)

Government
  - Mayor: Giuseppe Parente

Area
  - Total: 16.75 km^{2} (6.47 sq mi)
- Elevation: 559 m (1,834 ft)

Population (2026)
  - Total: 639
  - Density: 38.1/km^{2} (98.8/sq mi)
- Demonym: Bellosguardesi
- Time zone: UTC+1 (CET)
  - Summer (DST): UTC+2 (CEST)
- Postal code: 84020
- Dialing code: 0828
- ISTAT code: 065015
- Patron saint: Saint Michael
- Saint day: 29 September
- Website: Official website

Bellosguardo is a village and comune (municipality) in the province of Salerno in the region of Campania in southern Italy. It has 639 inhabitants.

== Etymology ==
The name "Bellosguardo" is made up of two italian words: the first is "bello" that means "beautiful, pretty"; the second is "sguardo" meaning "view, landscape" in the italian vernacole of the place. Thus, the name literally means "beautiful view".

In the past, the town was also called "Belrisguardo".

== Geography ==
Bellosguardo is located in Cilento and is part of its national park. It borders the municipalities of Aquara, Felitto, Laurino, Ottati, Roscigno and Sant'Angelo a Fasanella.

== Demographics ==
As of 2026, the population is 639, of which 49.6% are male, and 50.4% are female. Minors make up 10.6% of the population, and seniors make up 35.4%.

Historical population

Year	Pop.	±%
1861	1,097	—
1871	1,265	+15.3%
1881	1,395	+10.3%
1901	1,787	+28.1%
1911	1,980	+10.8%
1921	2,050	+3.5%
1931	1,901	−7.3%
1936	1,954	+2.8%

Year	Pop.	±%
1951	1,975	+1.1%
1961	1,763	−10.7%
1971	1,448	−17.9%
1981	1,313	−9.3%
1991	1,165	−11.3%
2001	1,009	−13.4%
2011	853	−15.5%
2021	705	−17.4%

Source: ISTAT

=== Immigration ===
As of 2025, immigrants make up 13.5% of the total population. The 5 largest foreign countries of birth are Morocco, Afghanistan, Switzerland, Romania, and Bulgaria.

== Main sights ==
- St. Michael the Archangel's Church
- Forest Macchia
- St. Maria's convent
- Salvo D'Acquisto's square

== Cuisine ==
Typical dishes include:

- Sfogliatella bellosguardese
- Tortanetto
- Cicci ammaritati
- Bucatini ammullicati
- Coniglio 'mbuttunat

== See also ==
- Cilentan dialect
