= Sicignano (surname) =

- Pronunciation: See-chee-nya-no
- Language: Italian

Origin
- Region of origin: Italy

Other names
- Variant form: Sicinius

Sicignano is an Italian habitational surname from Sicignano degli Alburni.

== Etymology ==
Sicignano is the Modern Italian descendant of the cognomen Sicinianus.

Possible Latin forms include, in the nominative:

- "Sicinius", masculine singular
- Sicinia, feminine singular
- Sicinii, masculine plural
- Siciniae, feminine plural
- Sicinianus, masculine adoptive
- Siciniana, feminine adoptive

Sicinia + anus = Sicinianus → Sicignano

== People ==
- Vincenzo Sicignano (b. 1974), Italian football player
