= San Rufo =

- Comune
- Comune di San Rufo
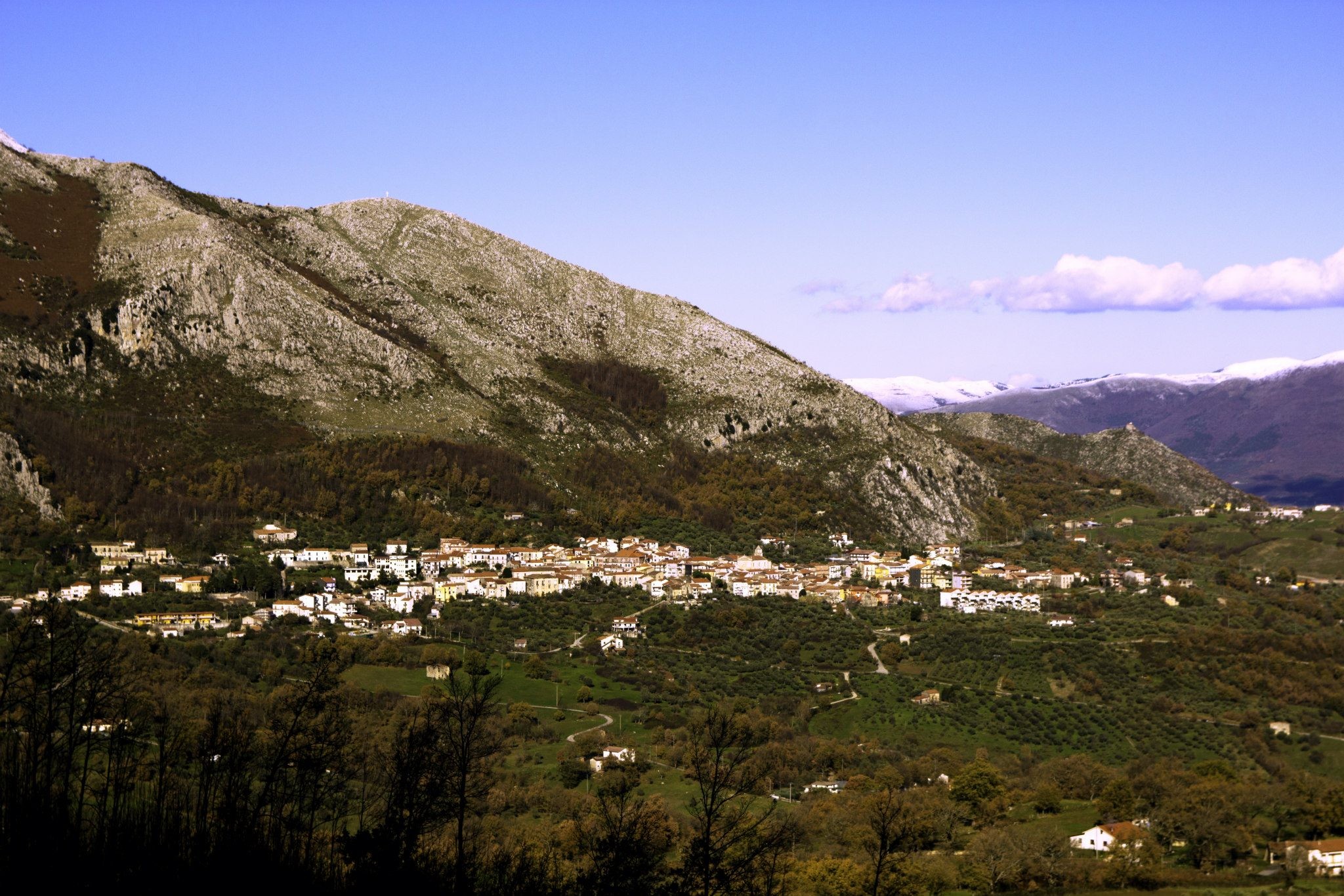
- Panorama of San Rufo

- Coat of arms

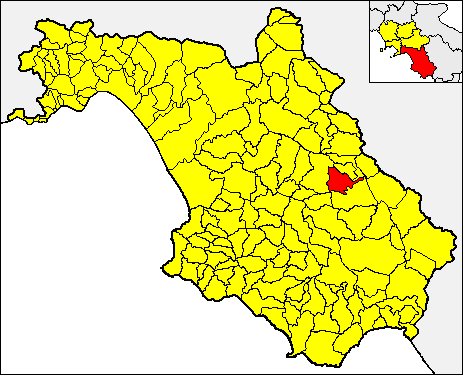
- San Rufo within the Province of Salerno

- Location within Italy Location within Campania
- Coordinates: 40°26′N 15°28′E
- Country: Italy
- Region: Campania
- Province: Salerno (SA)
- Frazioni: Fontana Vaglio

Government
  - Mayor: Marmo Michele

Area
  - Total: 31 km^{2} (12 sq mi)
- Elevation: 640 m (2,100 ft)

Population (1 December 2009)
  - Total: 1,760
  - Density: 57/km^{2} (150/sq mi)
- Demonym: Rufini
- Time zone: UTC+1 (CET)
  - Summer (DST): UTC+2 (CEST)
- Postal code: 84030
- Dialing code: 0975
- Website: Official website

San Rufo is a village and comune in the province of Salerno, in the Campania region of southern Italy located in the Vallo di Diano. San Rufo extends over 31 square kilometres, much of which is mountainous or hilly terrain. With defence in mind, the old town was built at over 600 meters above sea level. Another reason for the choice of location was the marshy nature of the wide Vallo di Diano plain, which sits at an average 450 metres above sea level.

The town itself was located, and the surrounding countryside settled, on the slopes of Monte Cocuzzo delle Puglie and the Alburni Mountains. The two ranges face each other, forming an angle whose tip is scored by a narrow, deep valley: the Valtorno. This pass between the two mountain ranges, called Passo della Sentinella (Salerno), has since prehistoric times provided a strategic link between Vallo di Diano and Cilento regions. Indeed, the ancient "Via degli Stranieri" ("Strangers' Way"), a place name that beautifully illustrates the importance of the location, once passed through here. The Spina dell'Ausino mountain, elevation 1,426 meters, and Serra Nuda mountain, elevation 1,283 meters, are around San Rufo.

Until the early 19th century, the town was called Santo Rufo and then changed to San Rufo.

== History ==
The area where San Rufo now stands has been occupied over the centuries by a number of villages, the oldest of which was Casalvetere. Archaeological findings proved that Casalvetere flourished in Roman times near what is now the "Old Town". The village disappeared probably in mediaeval times. Casalvetere was the original home of the stone wayside post that now stands near the site of the Pellegrini Palace, on the main street crossing the town.

Further evidence of Roman settlements is also found in the archaeological remains occasionally found by farmers in the fields near Santa Maria Casenove and Campanella. These were the sites of the Roman pagi (administrative districts) in the Tegianum region. In 1926, the tomb of Gaius Luxilius Macer, dating from the 1st century AD, was found in the Campanella district. Its inscription celebrates that he was "undefeated", most probably as a chariot rider in the races held at the Campus Martius in Rome.

In the 9th to 10th centuries, the village of Calvanello originated in response to the Saracen raids that plagued the valley and its plain. Calvanello was located at the opposite end of Casalvetere to what is now the old town, in a dominant position outside the castle of the same name. The ruins of the castle's guard tower and of the much larger building that housed the guards themselves can still be seen. Nothing visible remains of the village itself. Calvanello was laid out as a fortified village, a safe refuge for the inhabitants in times of siege. At some time, probably during the 13th to 14th centuries, the village was destroyed – it seems through a struggle for power with the nearby village of San Marzano. Oral sources claim that it was wiped out by the Castle of Teggiano. While it existed, it was a key site in the defence strategy of the Vallo di Diano, since it had an excellent vantage point from its elevated position.

Documents dating back to before 1000 AD mention the origins of San Rufo, located almost halfway between Calvanello and Casalvetere. The new village took root at the foot of a high rock which protected it from the rear, leaving only the side overlooking the valley vulnerable to attacks. Tradition incorrectly attributes the founding of San Rufo to Gubello Pellegrini, in the late 13th century, in honour of Saint Rufus, the third bishop of Capua. Actually, Pellegrini was instead the first baron of Terra di Santo Rufo, which was founded as a hamlet of the State of Diano along with other neighbouring villages, after the donation from the Sanseverino family of the Bosco di Policeta, a large mountain estate that remained in the hands of the Pellegrini family until the 20th century.

San Rufo was a fief of the Pellegrini family until the 17th century. It then passed to the Rinaldo barons in 1697, and to the Laviano family in 1779. Oral tradition has it that San Rufo sprang up after a few shepherds from nearby Diano settled in the locality.

== Main sights ==
There are remains of the ancient castle, while the town centre contains some buildings from the 17th and 18th century.

Just outside the old town of San Rufo, above the Tempa Sanctuary, are the ruins of the Castle of Calvanello sitting on the hilltop. The remains of the ancient village that lay at its feet are no longer visible.

Built between the 9th and 10th centuries, the Castle was never used as a residence. Its purpose has always been military. The inhabitants of the fortified village that settled around the Castle took refuge inside its walls, working on the owner's land in exchange for protection.

The Castle was an example of the extensive castle-building that took place during this period. Numerous fortifications were built on hilltops as the main means of defence against the constant incursions by the fearsome Saracen pirates, the later Norman invasions, and the frequent fighting between towns and villages over land and power.

The castle and village were destroyed – apparently as a result of a struggle for power with the nearby village of San Marzano, also no longer in existence – sometime between the 14th and 15th centuries.

The military nature of the castle is shown by the tower on the highest peak and by another, larger structure lower down, which housed the guards. Between the two buildings is a cistern carved from the rock, which held water that enabled the inhabitants to survive long periods of siege. Its elevation (770 m) made the castle an excellent strategic location, with visual coverage of much of the Vallo di Diano. This valley provided a means of communication with the other castles along the same valley and with the Castle of Teggiano, the most important in the area.

== Poem of San Rufo by Nicola Marmo ==
Nicola Marmo (1838-1904), was born in San Rufo and became a well known poet of his day wrote the following poem about San Rufo:

http://lyricstranslate.com/en/san-rufo-san-rufo.html#ixzz58kYBz05S

San Rufo

San Rufo mia, bella, aria gentile beato chi ci viene ad abitare.

Io ora ci sono, e me ne devo andare questa strada lunga, chi la vuole fare.

Arrivo a S. Antonio e mi siedo oltre S. Giuseppe non riesco ad andare.

Maledetto chi mi procura questo grande dolore di lasciare il paesino mio tanto caro.

Le lacrime che mi cadono le asciugo e la lunga via comincio a percorrere.

Translation (English)

San Rufo

My San Rufo, beautiful, kind gentle air blessed are those who come to live there.

I'm here now, and I must go on this long road, for who wants to do it.

I arrive in S. Antonio and I sit down beyond S. Joseph I can not go on to.

Cursed to the one who gives me this great pain to leave this village so dear to me.

The tears that fall down I dry them and the long road away I start to walk.

== See also ==
- Vallo di Diano
- Alburni
