= Sicignano degli Alburni =

- Comune
- Comune di Sicignano degli Alburni
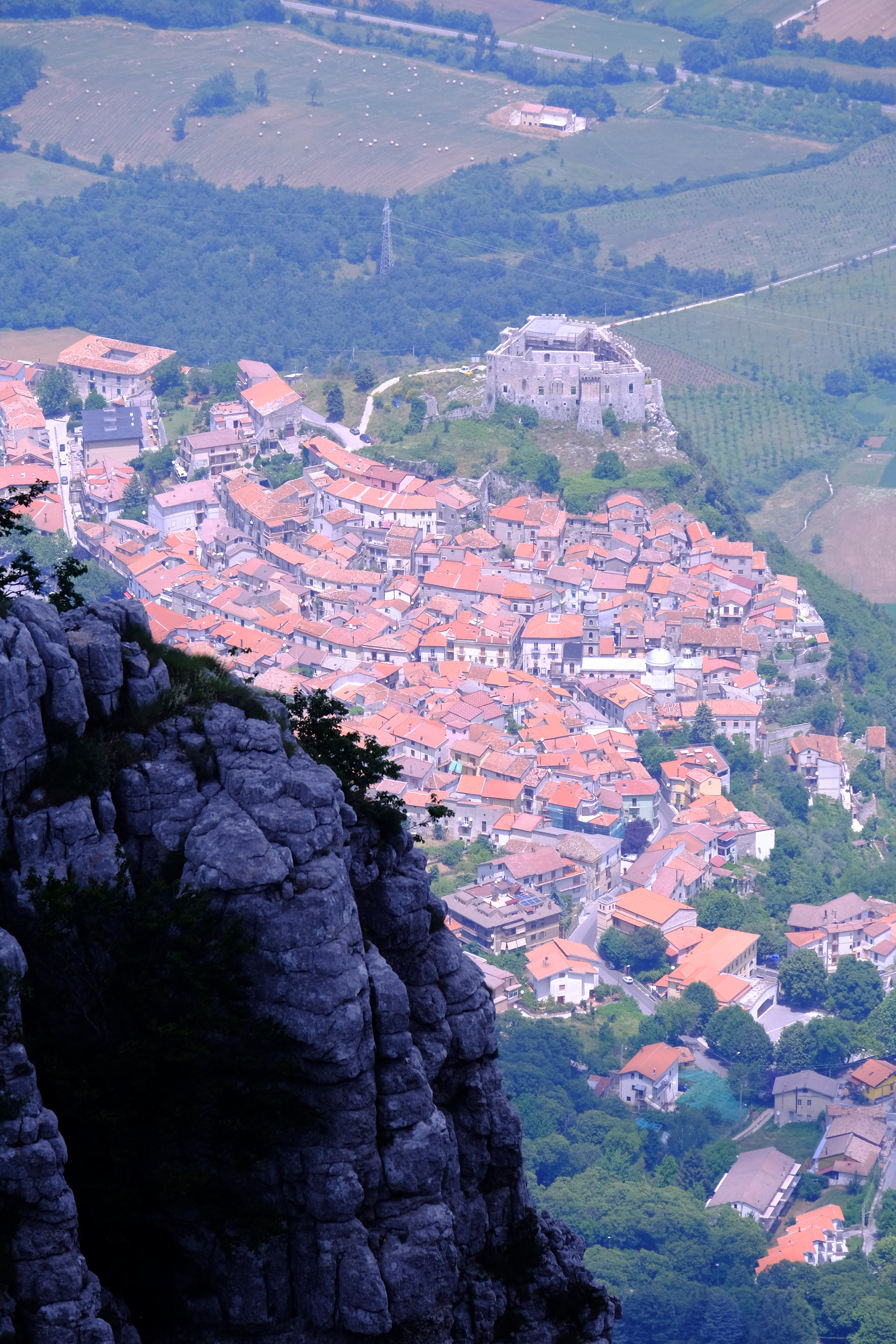
- View with the castle

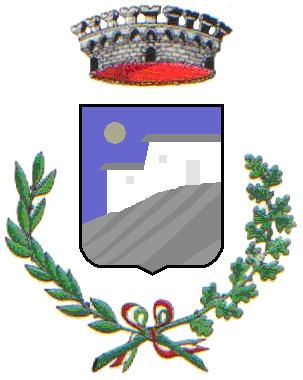
- Coat of arms

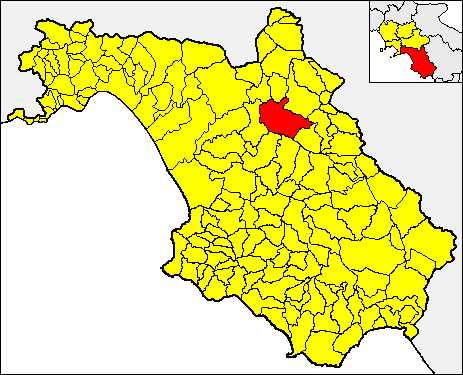
- Sicignano degli Alburni within the Province of Salerno

- Location within Italy Location within Campania
- Coordinates: 40°33′34.8″N 15°18′25.2″E
- Country: Italy
- Region: Campania
- Province: Salerno (SA)
- Frazioni: Castelluccio Cosentino, Galdo degli Alburni, Scorzo, Terranova, Zuppino

Government
  - Mayor: Ernesto Millerosa

Area
  - Total: 81.11 km^{2} (31.32 sq mi)
- Elevation: 605 m (1,985 ft)

Population (1 January 2018)
  - Total: 3,411
  - Density: 42.05/km^{2} (108.9/sq mi)
- Demonym: Sicignanesi
- Time zone: UTC+1 (CET)
  - Summer (DST): UTC+2 (CEST)
- Postal code: 84029
- Dialing code: 0828
- Patron saint: St. Matthew
- Saint day: 7 April
- Website: Official website

Sicignano degli Alburni (also known simply as Sicignano) is a town and comune in the province of Salerno in the Campania region of southern Italy.

== History ==
The Roman war hero Lucius Sicinius Dentatus, of the gens Sicinia, founded Sicignano degli Alburni as his ancient latifundium.

The earliest documentation of Sicignano is from a medieval donation document dated 1086 by which the Norman count Asclettino Sicignano, Lord of Polla (died 1086), gives the abbey of Cava dei Tirreni the monastery of St. Peter and St. Catherine's Church, located in the Castrum Pollae.

From 1811 to 1860, Sicignano was part of the district of Postiglione, belonging to the District of Country of the Two Sicilies.

From 1860 to 1927 it was part of the district of Postiglione, belonging to the district to campaign.

== Geography ==
Sicignano is located between the valley of the Tanagro river and the Alburni mountain range; its territory lying mostly within the Parco nazionale del Cilento e Vallo di Diano.

The municipality is bordered by Auletta, Buccino, Castelcivita, Contursi Terme, Ottati, Palomonte, Petina and Postiglione.

== Transport ==
The town has a railway station on the Salerno–Potenza–Taranto line, located 10 km north. Sicignano station is also the junction point of a line, the Sicignano–Lagonegro, closed in 1987, that counts two other station in the municipal territory: Castelluccio Cosentino and Galdo.

The municipality is crossed by the A2 motorway Salerno-Reggio Calabria, and is served by the exit "Sicignano-Potenza", that is also the western end of the RA 05 motorway to Potenza. The national highway SS 19 crosses the villages of Scorzo and Zuppino.

== People ==
- Girolamo Britonio (15th–16th century), poet
- Vincenzo Baldoni (1924–2003), architect
- Costantino Catena (b. 1969), pianist

== See also ==
- Cilento
- Cilentan dialect
- Sicinius
- Sicignano (surname)
