= Alburni =

Mountain range in Salerno, Italy

UNESCO World Heritage Site
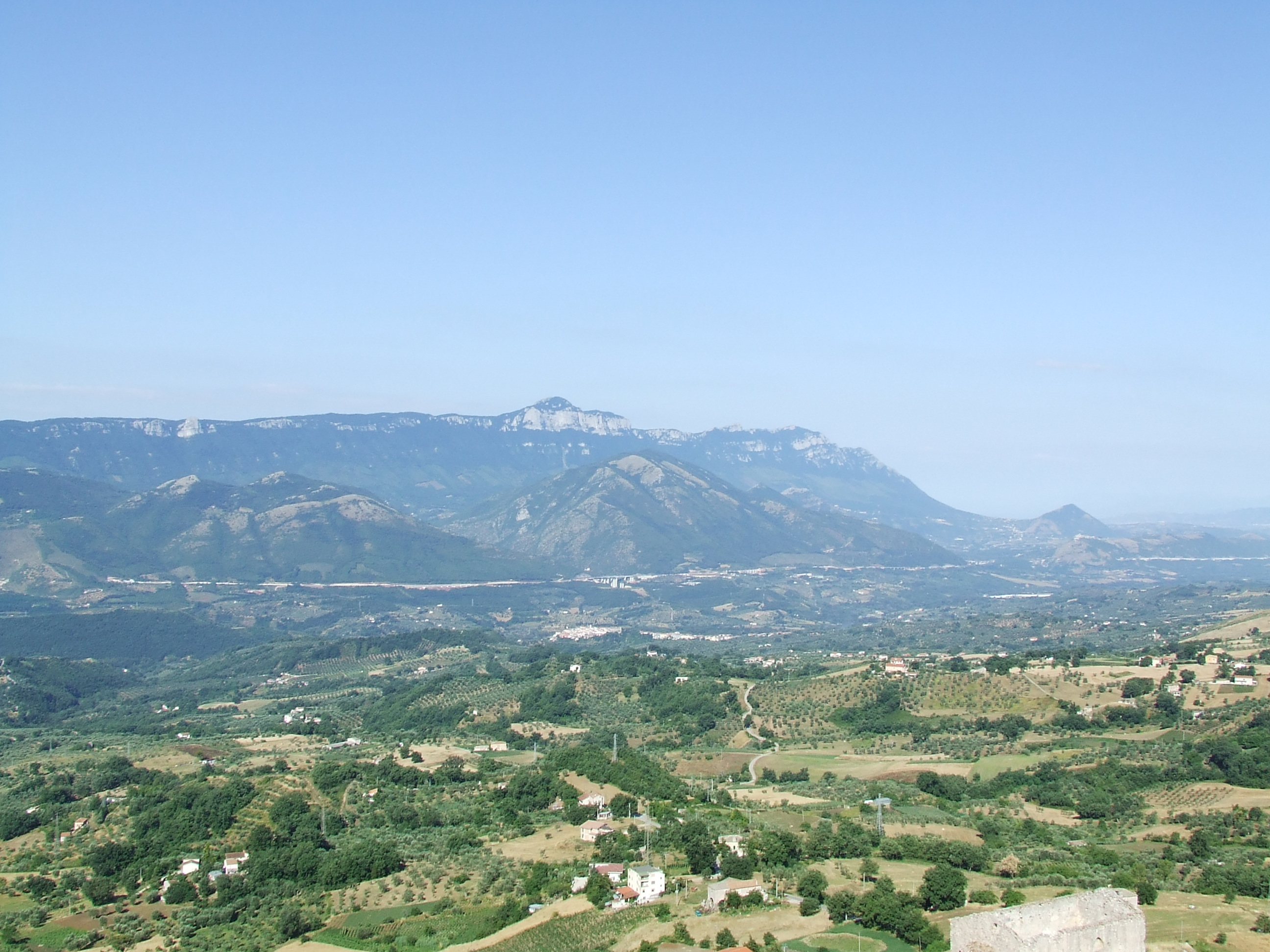
- View of the Alburni mountains

- Location within Campania Location within Italy
- Location: Province of Salerno, Campania, Italy
- Part of: "Paestum, Velia, the Certosa di Padula, Mount Cervati and the Vallo di Diano" part of Cilento and Vallo di Diano National Park with the Archeological Sites of Paestum and Velia, and the Certosa di Padula
- Criteria: Cultural: (iii)(iv)
- Reference: 842-001
- Inscription: 1998 (22nd Session)
- Coordinates: 40°28′N 15°23′E

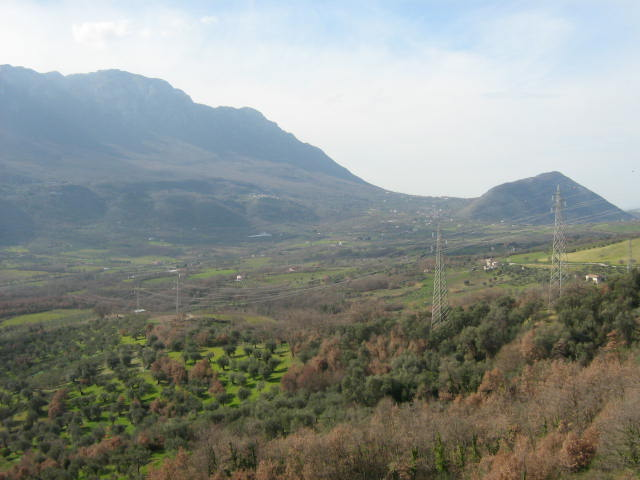
The Alburni seen from the Sicignano valley

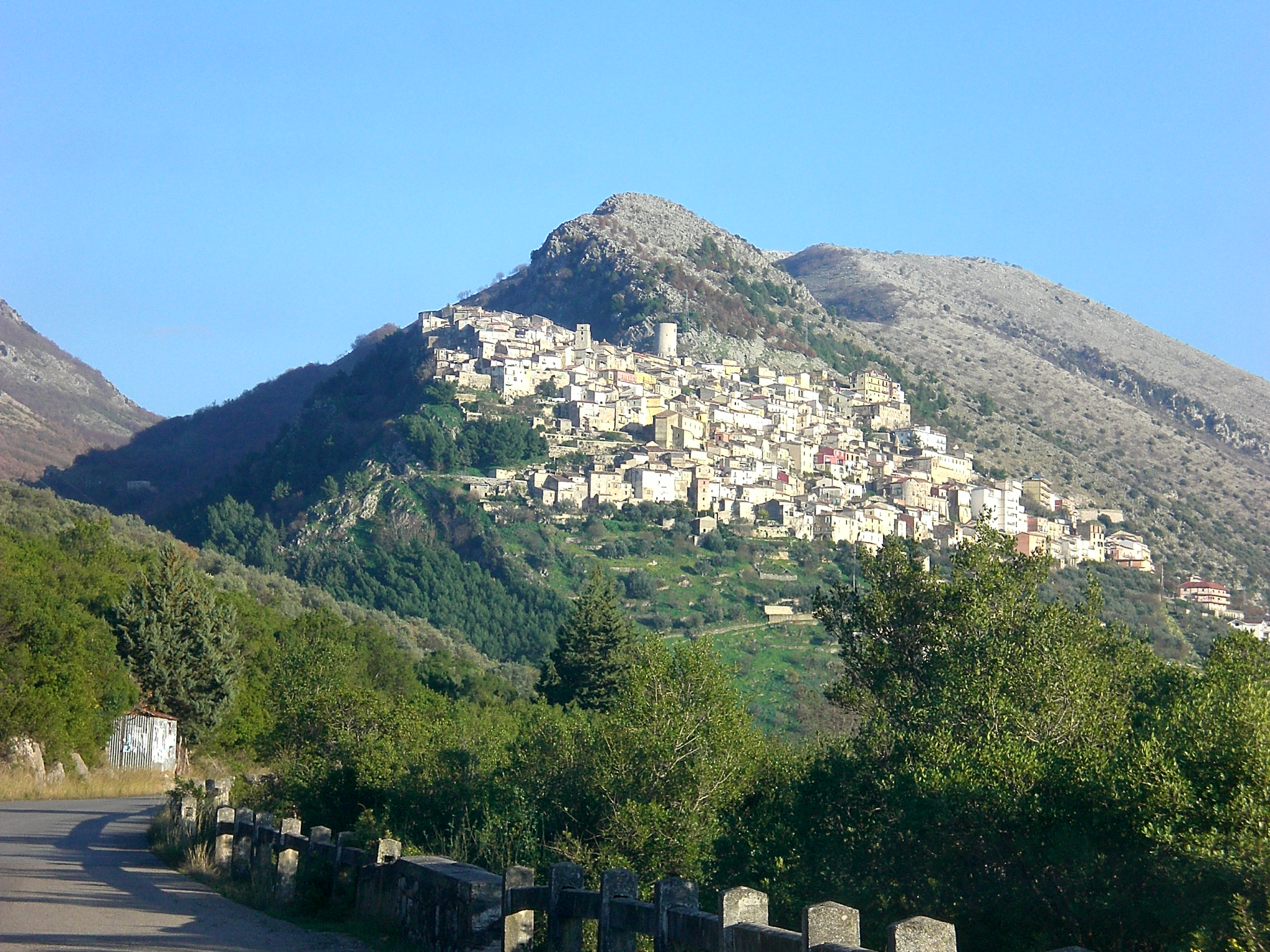
View of the Alburni in Castelcivita

The Alburni are an Italian mountain range of the Province of Salerno, Campania, part of the Apennines. Due to their geomorphology, they are popularly known as the "Dolomites of Campania" or of Southern Italy. The highest mountain is the Panormo (1,742 amsl). Its second name, Alburno, gives the name to the whole range.

== Overview ==
Part of the Lucan Apennines and included in Cilento National Park, the Alburni are located in the eastern area of Cilento, near the borders between Campania and Basilicata. In north-east the range degrades into the plain of Vallo di Diano. Some of the rivers flowing below the mountains are the Calore Lucano, Tanagro, Fasanella and Ripiti.

The karstic nature of the mountains favoured the formation of several caves, more than 400. The most famous are the show caves of Castelcivita and Pertosa.

On the road pass between Sant'Angelo a Fasanella and Petina there are located the Antece, an ancient rock sculpture (5th/6th century BC), and the observatory of Casone d'Aresta.

== List of mountains ==
Mountain	Elevation (amsl)	Municipalities
Panormo (Alburno)	1,742	Sicignano degli Alburni, Ottati, Petina
Monte della Nuda	1,704	Castelcivita, Postiglione, Sicignano degli Alburni
Spina dell'Ausino	1,426	Corleto Monforte, San Rufo, San Pietro al Tanagro
Monte Pizzuto	1,403	Postiglione, Castelcivita, Controne
Caramito	1,364	Ottati, Petina, Sant'Angelo a Fasanella
Il Figliolo	1,364	Petina, Sant'Angelo a Fasanella, Ottati
La Marta	1,303	Polla, Auletta, Pertosa
Serra Nicola	1,301	Corleto Monforte, Sant'Arsenio, Polla, Auletta, Petina
Serra Nuda	1,283	San Rufo, Corleto Monforte
Costa Palomba	1,125	Corleto Monforte, Sant'Angelo a Fasanella
Monte Forloso	1,102	Petina, Sicignano degli Alburni
Tempa del Prato	1,048	Ottati, Sant'Angelo a Fasanella
Costa la Croce	951	Ottati, Aquara

== See also ==
- Gelbison, a mountain in the middle of Cilento
- Cervati, a mountain in southern Cilento
