= Castelcivita Caves =

Cave system in Salerno, Campania, Italy

Grotte di Castelcivita (Castelcivita Caves)
- Grotte di Spartaco
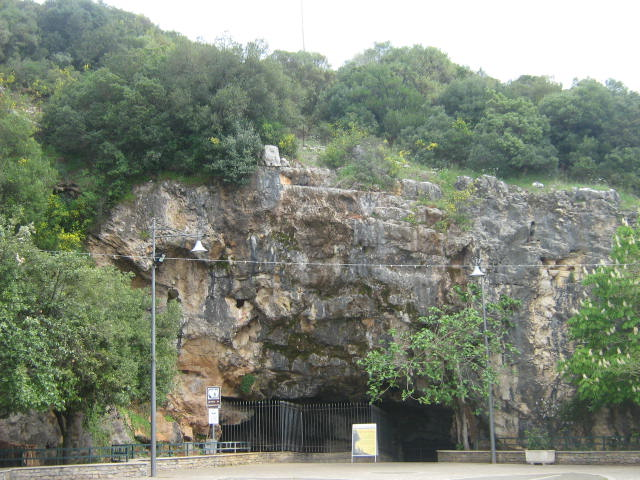
- Entrance to the caves

- Location within Italy
- Location: Castelcivita (SA, Campania, Italy)
- Coordinates: 40°29′44″N 15°12′32″E
- Length: 5,000 m
- Elevation: 94 m
- Geology: Karst cave
- Entrances: 1
- Access: Public
- Show cave length: 1,700 m
- Website: Official website

The Castelcivita Caves (Italian: Grotte di Castelcivita) are a karst cave system located in the municipality of Castelcivita (and partially in Controne), in the province of Salerno, Campania, southern Italy.

== Overview ==
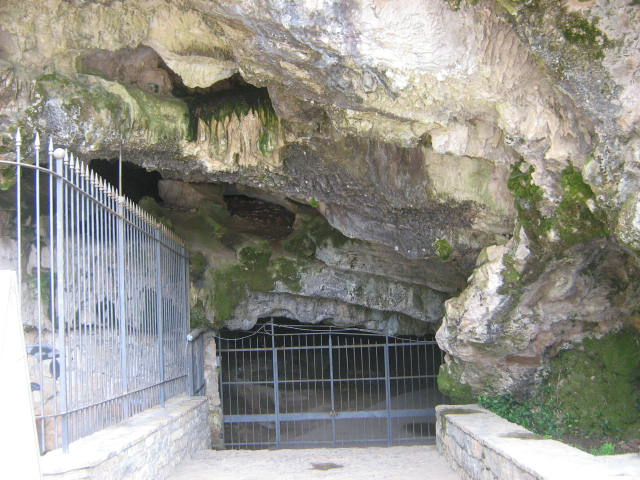
Entrance to the caves.

Their second name, "Spartacus Caves", is due to a popular tradition telling that the Roman gladiator used the caves as a shelter during its march from Brundisium to the final battle of Silarus river, this one close to the town of Castelcivita.

Situated in an area near Calore lucano river and close to the western side of the Alburni mountains, they are 3 km far from Castelcivita and 3 from Controne, and close to a zone named Ponte Paestum (i.e. Paestum Bridge). The length of touristic area is of 1.7 km and the total extension of the voids is of 3 km.

== See also ==
- Pertosa Caves
- List of caves
- List of caves in Italy
