= Mandamento (administrative district) =

Historically a mandamento was an administrative district part of Italian territory under the jurisdiction of a "praetor", an intermediate between the district and the municipality.

It was introduced in the Kingdom of Sardinia with the edict of Vittorio Emanuele I on 7 October 1814, then revised with the Rattazzi law (RD No. 3702 of 23/10/1859), introduced in the Kingdom of Italy with the law March 20, 1865, n. 2248, and remained in force until 1923, and judicially until 2 January 2000.
