= Roccadaspide =

- Comune
- Comune di Roccadaspide
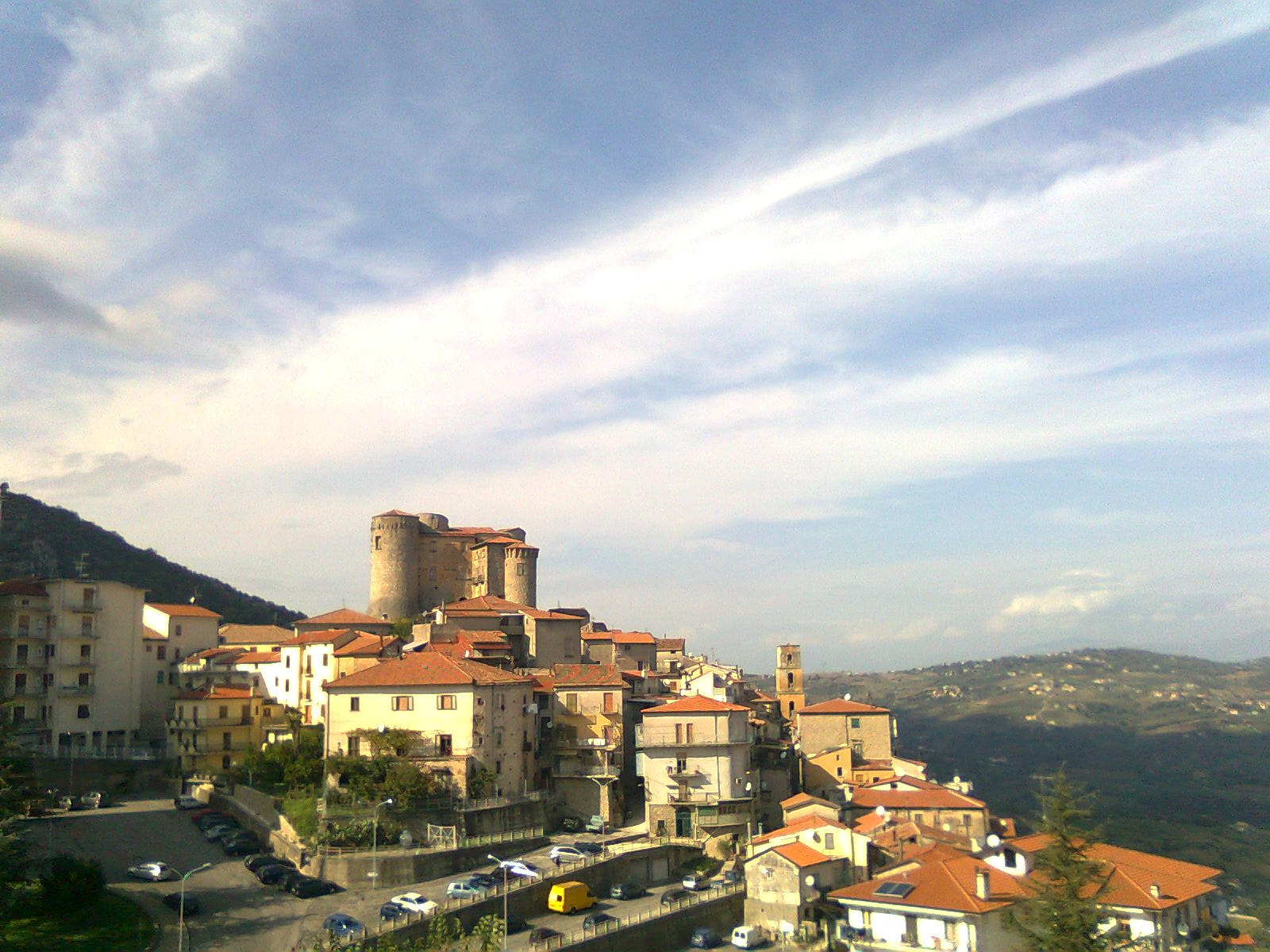

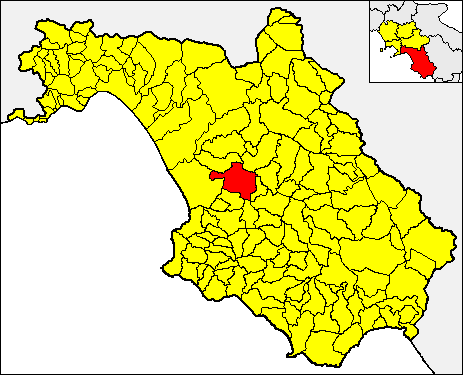
- Roccadaspide within the Province of Salerno

- Location within Italy Location within Campania
- Coordinates: 40°26′N 15°11′E
- Country: Italy
- Region: Campania
- Province: Salerno (SA)
- Frazioni: Carretiello, Cavalli, Doglie, Ecoli, Fonte, Serra, Seude, Tempalta

Government
  - Mayor: Gabriele Iuliano

Area
  - Total: 64.16 km^{2} (24.77 sq mi)
- Elevation: 340 m (1,120 ft)

Population (31 December 2013)
  - Total: 7,289
  - Density: 113.6/km^{2} (294.2/sq mi)
- Demonym: Rocchesi
- Time zone: UTC+1 (CET)
  - Summer (DST): UTC+2 (CEST)
- Postal code: 84069
- Dialing code: 0828
- Patron saint: St. Symphorosa
- Saint day: 18 July
- Website: Official website

Roccadaspide (Campanian: A Rocca) is a town and comune in the province of Salerno in the Campania region of south-western Italy.

== History ==
The first settlements in the area are traced back to the Greek and Etruscan civilizations.

== Geography ==
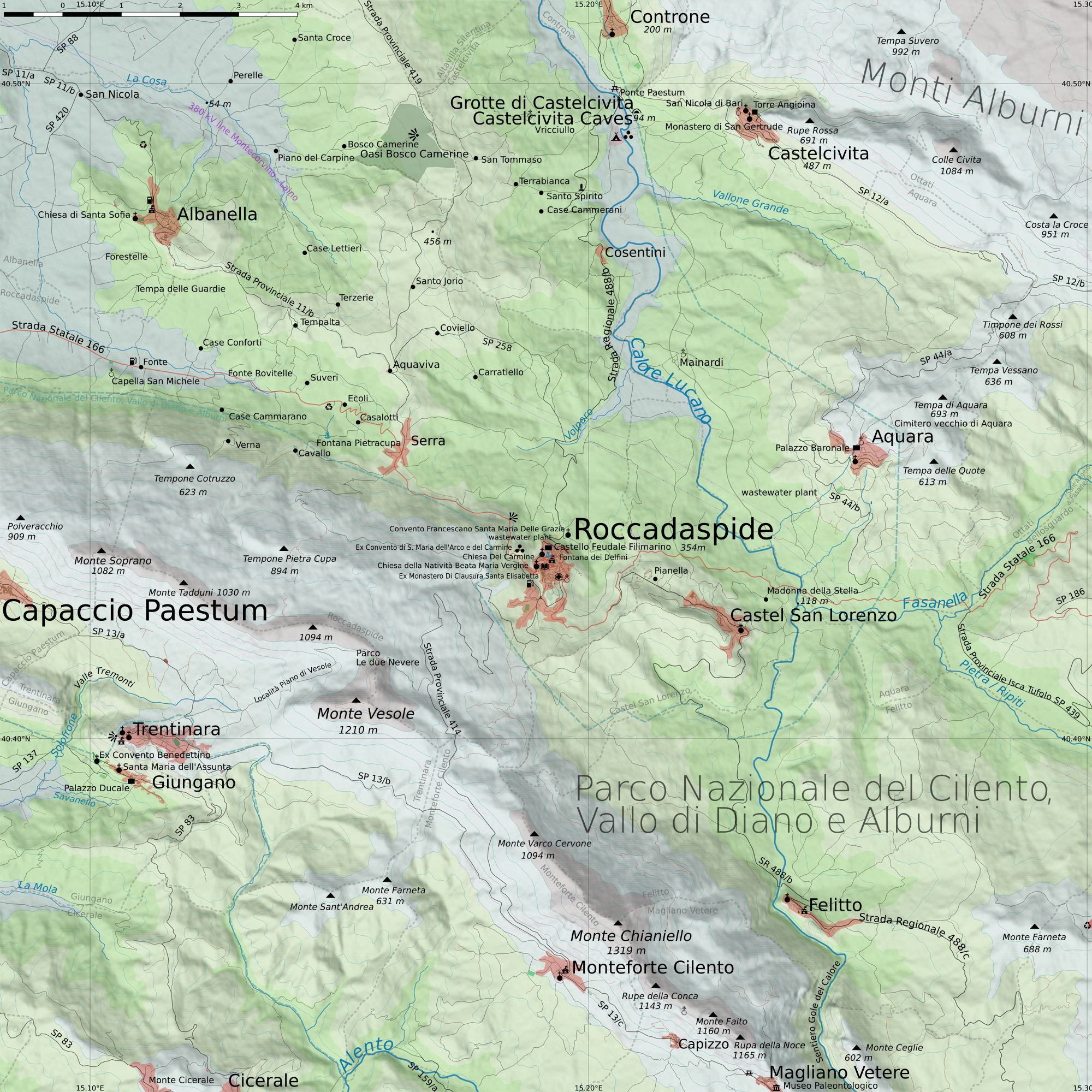
Map of Roccadaspide and surroundings

The town is located in the north-west side of Cilento, not too far from Paestum and in the Calore River Valley.
