= Calore Lucano =

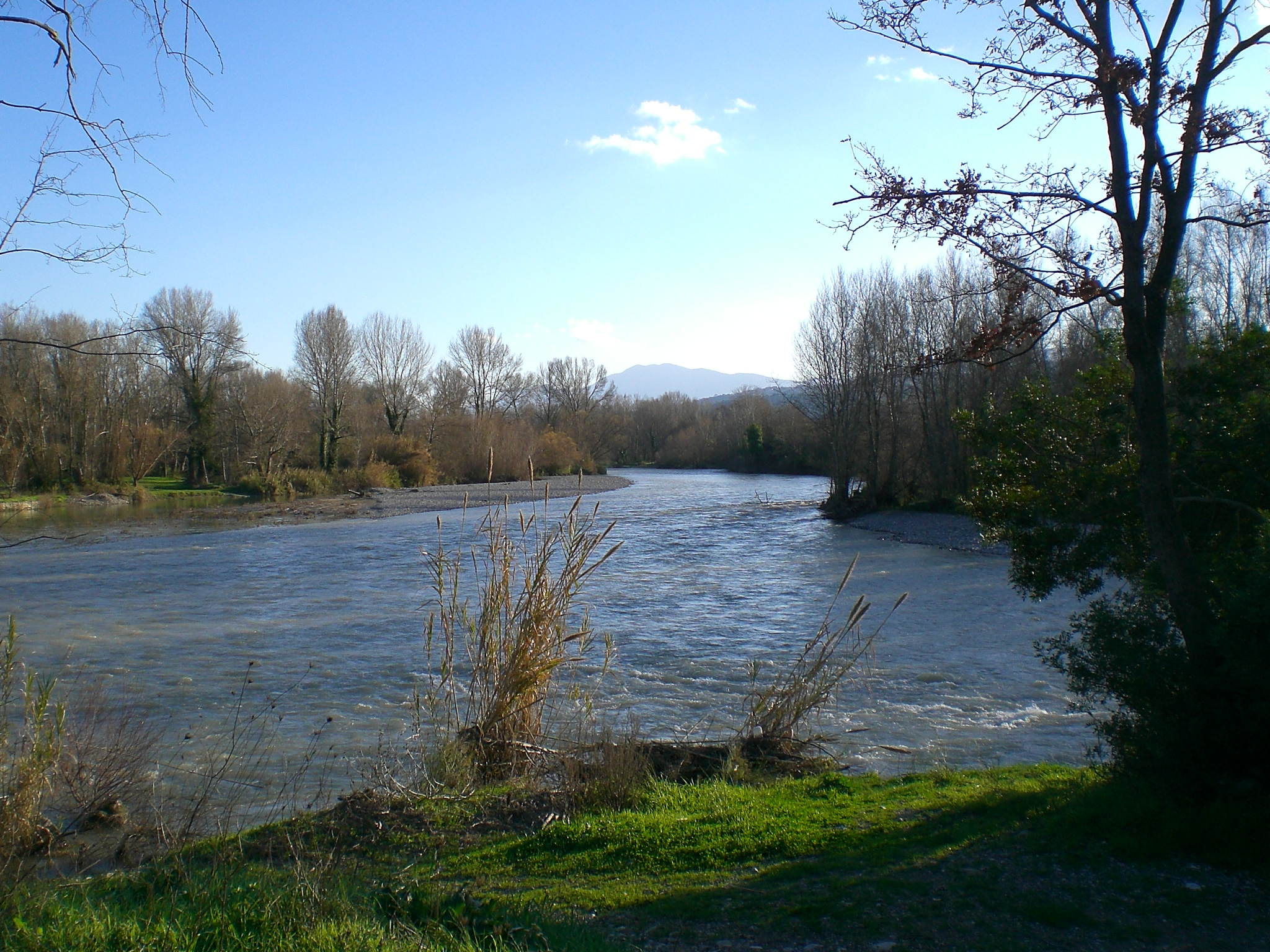

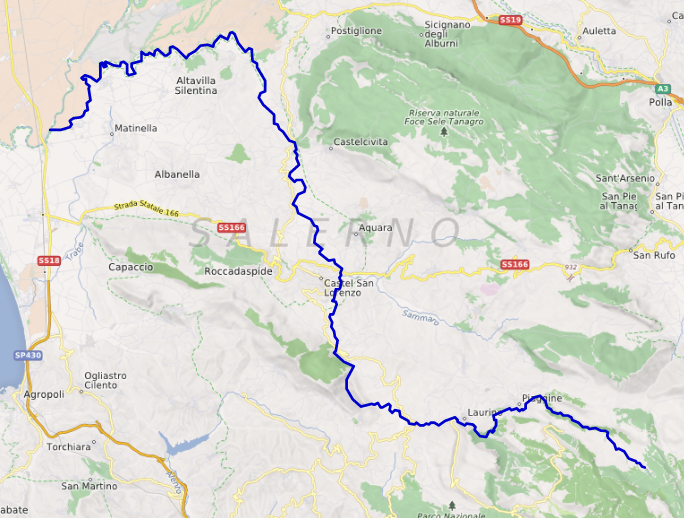

Location
- Country: Italy

Physical characteristics
- Source
  - location: Monte Cervati
- Mouth: Sele
  - coordinates: 40°30′18″N 15°01′10″E
- Length: 63 km (39 mi)
- Basin size: 780 km^{2} (300 mi^{2})
- Discharge
  - average: 29.80 m^{3}/s (1,052 cu ft/s)

Basin features
- Progression: Sele→ Tyrrhenian Sea

The Calore Lucano (or Calore Salernitano) is a river in Campania, southern Italy, whose course is entirely included in the province of Salerno, within Cilento, for a total of about 63 kilometres (39 mi). It is an important left tributary of the Sele. In ancient times it was known as Calor.

== Overview ==
It rises in the northern slopes of Monte Cervati, in the Apennine Mountains and flows through the Parco nazionale del Cilento e Vallo di Diano. For long reaches it flows between high rocky walls, as near Laurino or in the gorge of Monte Pescorubino, between the localities of Magliano Vetere and Felitto.

It empties into the Sele not far from the ancient city of Paestum.

The Calore is one of the few rivers in Europe in which the European otter still lives.
