= Salati =

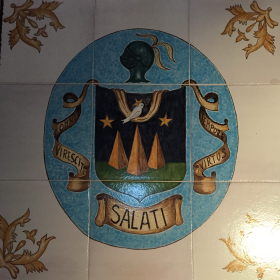

Salati is a surname.

The Salati surname is generally considered to be of Italian origin. Ancestral records date the surname back many centuries in Italy.

It has been suggested that the ancient root of the Salati surname derives from Pharaoh Salitis, who ruled Egypt and who founded the 15th Dynasty.

Notable people with the surname include:

- Alessandro Salati (died 1509), Bishop of Minori from 1498 to 1509
- Armando Salati (1884–1963), Italian Vice Consul to the United States
- Doug Salati (born 1985), American author
- Enrico Salati (1788–1869}, Prime Minister of the Duchy of Parma from 1849 to 1859
- Giovan Maria Salati (1796–1879), Napoleonic soldier
- Giuseppe Giulio Salati (1847-1930), author of L'Antica Gioi
- Octavio M. Salati (1914–2001), Professor of Electrical Engineering at the University of Pennsylvania

In history

- La Cappella Madonna della Grazia (c1600) the historic Salati family chapel in Gioi, Italy

In popular culture

The Salati Case, novel by Tobias Jones, Faber and Faber, 2009, ISBN 9780571237098

Baci Salati, Italian film (comedy), Renato Zappala and Antonio Zeta, 2012

== See also ==
- Passo dei Salati, mountain pass in north-western Italy
- Salatis, genus of butterflies
