= Laurino =

- Comune
- Comune di Laurino
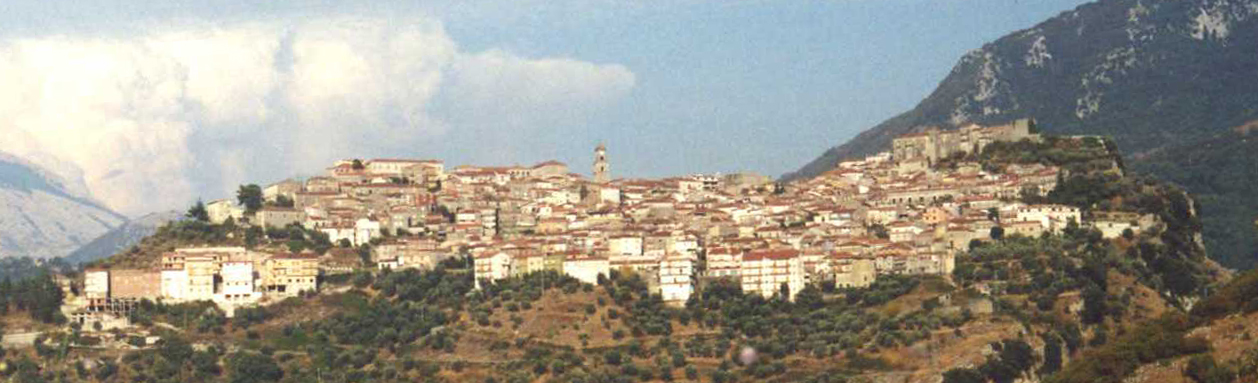
- Panoramic view of Laurino

- Coat of arms

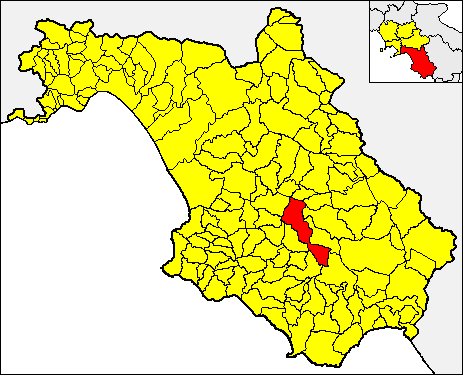
- Laurino within the Province of Salerno

- Location within Italy Location within Campania
- Coordinates: 40°20′N 15°20′E
- Country: Italy
- Region: Campania
- Province: Salerno (SA)
- Frazioni: Pruno, Villa Littorio

Government
  - Mayor: Romano Gregorio

Area
  - Total: 70.46 km^{2} (27.20 sq mi)
- Elevation: 531 m (1,742 ft)

Population (31 August 2017)
  - Total: 1,488
  - Density: 21.12/km^{2} (54.70/sq mi)
- Demonym: Laurinesi
- Time zone: UTC+1 (CET)
  - Summer (DST): UTC+2 (CEST)
- Postal code: 84057
- Dialing code: 0974
- Patron saint: St. Helena of Laurino
- Saint day: 22 May
- Website: Official website

Laurino is a town and comune in the province of Salerno in the Campania region of southwestern Italy.

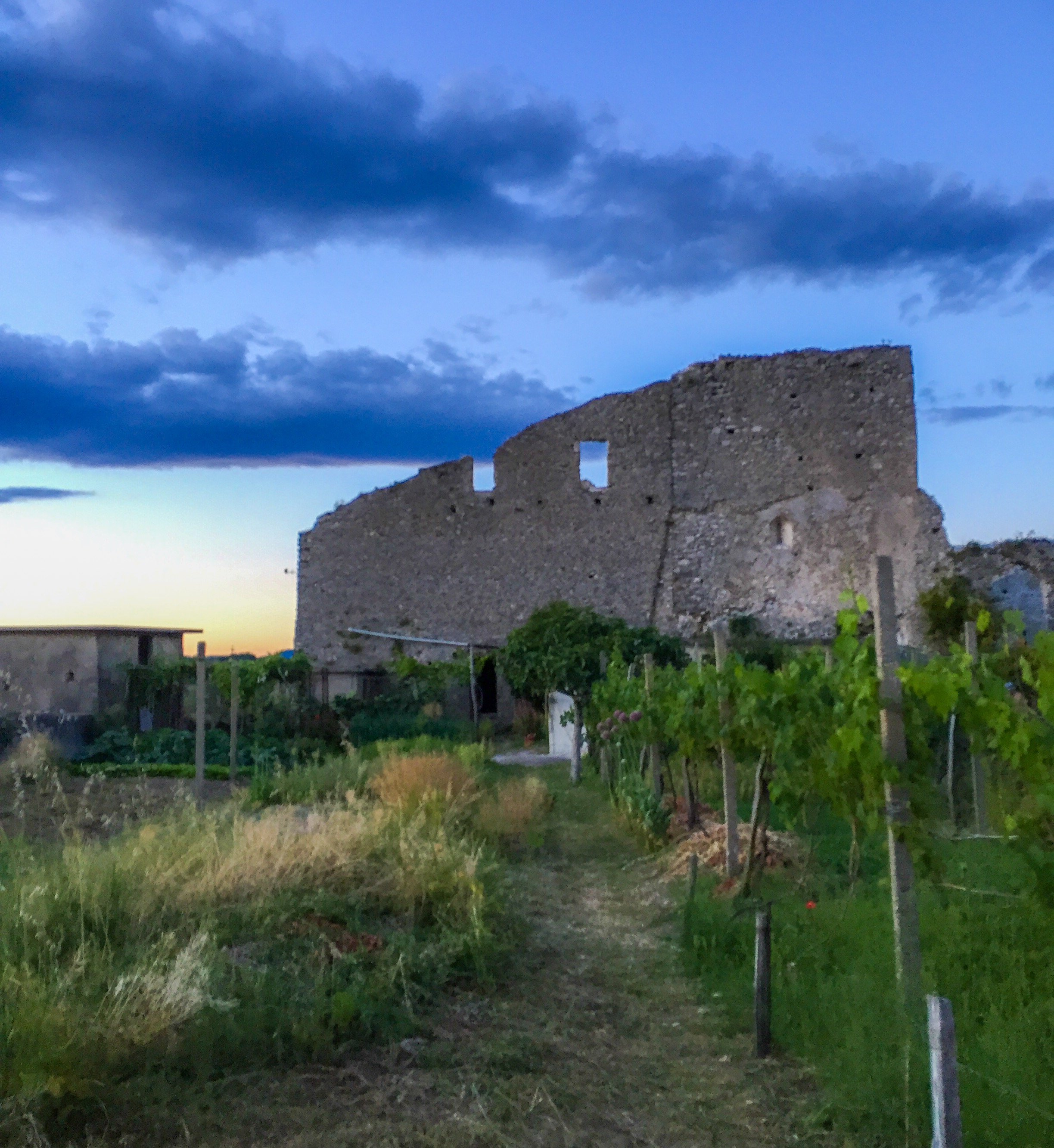
Ruins of the Ducal Palace

== Geography ==
Laurino is a typical medieval hill town of the Cilento, the southernmost part of Campania. It dominates the surrounding landscape, overlooking the Calore Lucano river, which is crossed by two medieval bridges; Laurino was once known as the "pearl of the Calore". The river flows through the Cilento national park from its source up on Mount Cervati; it is known for the wildlife it attracts, such as European otters. The name Laurino probably comes from the "laura" created by the integration of numerous Greek monks of Basil observance, who lived as hermits in the numerous caves in the area.

The municipality borders with Bellosguardo, Campora, Felitto, Magliano Vetere, Novi Velia, Piaggine, Rofrano, Roscigno, Sacco, Stio and Valle dell'Angelo. It counts two hamlets (frazioni): Pruno and Villa Littorio.

== History ==
The first historical mention of the CASTELLUM DE LAURI dates back to the year 932. In the 12th century the total population exceeded 3,500, spread between the main town and five surrounding villages. However Laurino was destroyed by the troops of Frederick III of Sicily during the War of the Sicilian Vespers (1282-1302).

Due to migration in recent decades toward the north in search for employment, the current population is just under 2000.

== Main sights ==
- Ruins of the Ducal Palace
- Frescos and wooden carvings of the main church, Santa Maria Maggiore.
- Medieval Bridge and natural springs
- Zipline 500 meters above gorge

The place is known for its natural environment, and initiatives such as the Jazz in Laurino festival in August, which attracts musicians from throughout the country.

== See also ==
- Cilentan language
