= Rofrano =

- Comune
- Comune di Rofrano
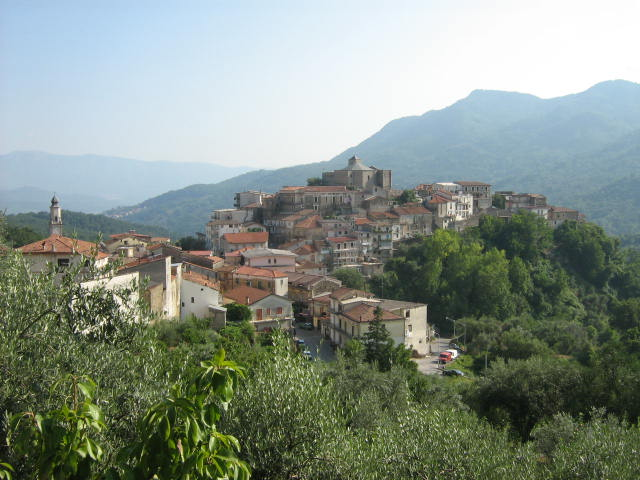
- North view of Rofrano

- Coat of arms

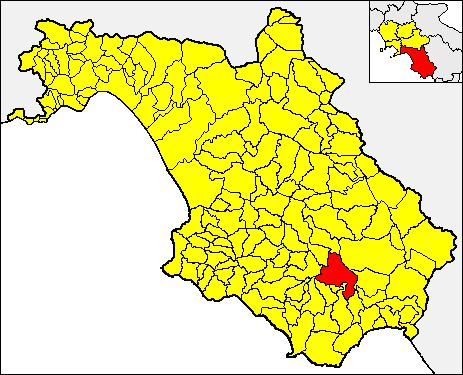
- Rofrano within the Province of Salerno

- Location within Italy Location within Campania
- Coordinates: 40°13′N 15°26′E
- Country: Italy
- Region: Campania
- Province: Salerno (SA)
- Frazioni: Abbenante, Cerreto, Fornillo, Pozzillo Borsito, Provitera, San Leo, San Menale, Treppaoli

Government
  - Mayor: Nicola Cammarano

Area
  - Total: 58 km^{2} (22 sq mi)
- Elevation: 450 m (1,480 ft)

Population (28 February 2015)
  - Total: 1,539
  - Density: 27/km^{2} (69/sq mi)
- Demonym: Rofranesi
- Time zone: UTC+1 (CET)
  - Summer (DST): UTC+2 (CEST)
- Postal code: 84070
- Dialing code: 0974
- Patron saint: Madonna of Grottaferrata
- Saint day: 8 September
- Website: Official website

Rofrano (Cilentan: U Franu) is a town and comune of the province of Salerno in the Campania region of south-west Italy. It is located in the southern Cilento. In 2015 its population was 1,539.

== History ==
The village was first settled between 3rd and 4th century by some farmers and was originally called Ruffium.

== Geography ==
=== Overview ===
Rofrano is situated on a hill below the Apennine Mountains and is surrounded mainly by forests. The town is 39 km from Vallo della Lucania, 55 km from Sala Consilina and 139 km from Salerno. Its municipal territory is adjacent to Alfano, Caselle in Pittari, Laurino, Laurito, Montano Antilia, Novi Velia, Roccagloriosa, Sanza, Torre Orsaia and Valle dell'Angelo. Its northernmost point shares part of the territory of Pruno with Laurino. To the north-west of the municipality, on the road to Sanza, is the Cervati, one of the highest mountains of Campania.

=== Frazioni ===
The hamlets (frazioni) of Rofrano are the villages of Cerreto and San Menale. Other localities, consisting mainly of some scattered farmhouses, are Abbenante, Fornillo, Pozzillo Borsito, Provitera, San Leo and Treppaoli.

- San Menale is located near Rofrano. With a population of 214, it is the most populous hamlet. The river Faraone crosses the south side of the village.
- Cerreto is located in south of the municipality, near the borders with Torre Orsaia and its hamlet Borgo Cerreto, and counts a population of 4.

== Gallery ==
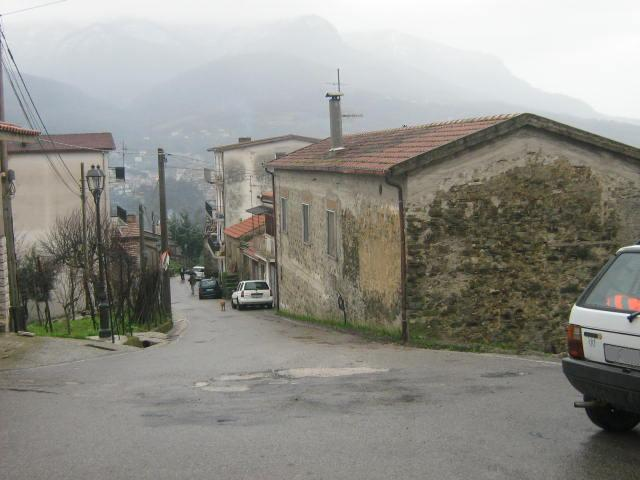
View of San Menale

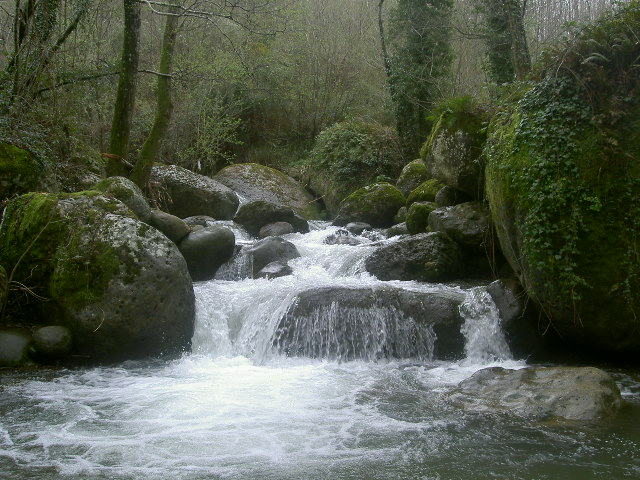
A waterfall on the river Faraone

== See also ==
- Cilentan dialect
- Cilento and Vallo di Diano National Park
