= Massicelle =

- Frazione
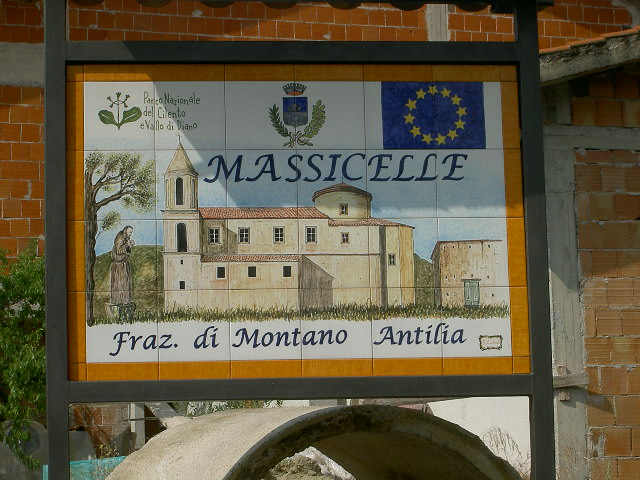
- A ceramic plaque representing the village church

- Location of Massicelle in Italy
- Coordinates: 40°8′20.43″N 15°19′36″E
- Country: Italy
- Region: Campania
- Province: Salerno (SA)
- Comune: Montano Antilia
- Elevation: 390 m (1,280 ft)

Population (2011)
  - Total: 529
- Demonym: Massicellesi (Massiciddari)
- Time zone: UTC+1 (CET)
  - Summer (DST): UTC+2 (CEST)
- Postal code: 84060
- Dialing code: (+39) 0974
- Patron saint: St. Irene

Massicelle is a southern Italian village and hamlet (frazione) of Montano Antilia, a municipality in the province of Salerno, Campania. in 2011 it had a population of 529.

== History ==
The village, whose name derives from the Middle French words mans en celle, was founded between the 9th and the 10th century by the local people who escaped from the Arab invasions of southern Italy. Part of the State of Cuccaro Vetere, in the Barony of Novi Velia, during the Middle Ages; Massicelle constituted a municipality in 1811, along with Abatemarco and Montano Antilia.

== Geography ==
=== Location ===
Located in southern Cilento and transcluded into its national park, Massicelle is a hill village that spans on the national road SR447/A, 4 km south of Futani and 4 km west of Abatemarco. It is 6 km from Montano Antilia, 7 from Cuccaro Vetere, 16 from Vallo della Lucania, and 17 from Palinuro and the Cilentan Coast.

=== Subdivision ===
Massicelle is divided into 8 quarters (casali): Carputi, Carosiello, Caprarizzi, Centopelli, Ciardella, Limonti, Massicella and Montemauro.

The main settlement is situated to the north and consists of 7 of the 8 quarters, located all around the central one of Massicella, which gives the name to the village. It includes, to the northeast, tie little localities of Scirocco (nearby Limonti and the cemetery), Serre and Pantana Zica (both close to a valley of olive trees). To the south, detached from the rest of the village by a ravine, lies the quarter of Centopelli, that includes the little locality of Ciaoli.

== Culture ==
The most important church is "Santa Maria Lauretana", built in 1478 and dedicated to St. Irene of Thessalonica. Among the local cultural events, it exists the annual "International Festival of Traditional Game and Toy".

== Transport ==
Massicelle is served by the SP430 "Cilentana", a highway that links Salerno (100 km northwest) to Sapri (33 km southeast), crossing Battipaglia, Agropoli and Vallo della Lucania. Nearest train station, Centola, is 11 km far and located in the village of San Severino.

== See also ==
- Cilentan dialect
