= Pervan =

Pervan may refer to:

== Places in Bosnia ==
- Pervan Gornji
- Pervan Donji

== People with the surname ==
- Đani Pervan (fl. from 1983) Bosnian musician
- Edoardo Pervan (fl. 1938), predecessor Italian Consul to the United States (at Philadelphia) of Armando Salati
- Marko Pervan (born 1996), Croatian footballer
- Pavao Pervan (born 1987), Austrian footballer
- Valentine Pervan, Australian educator recognised in the 1991 Queen's Birthday Honours
- Željko Pervan (born 1962), Croatian comedian
