= Abatemarco =

- Frazione
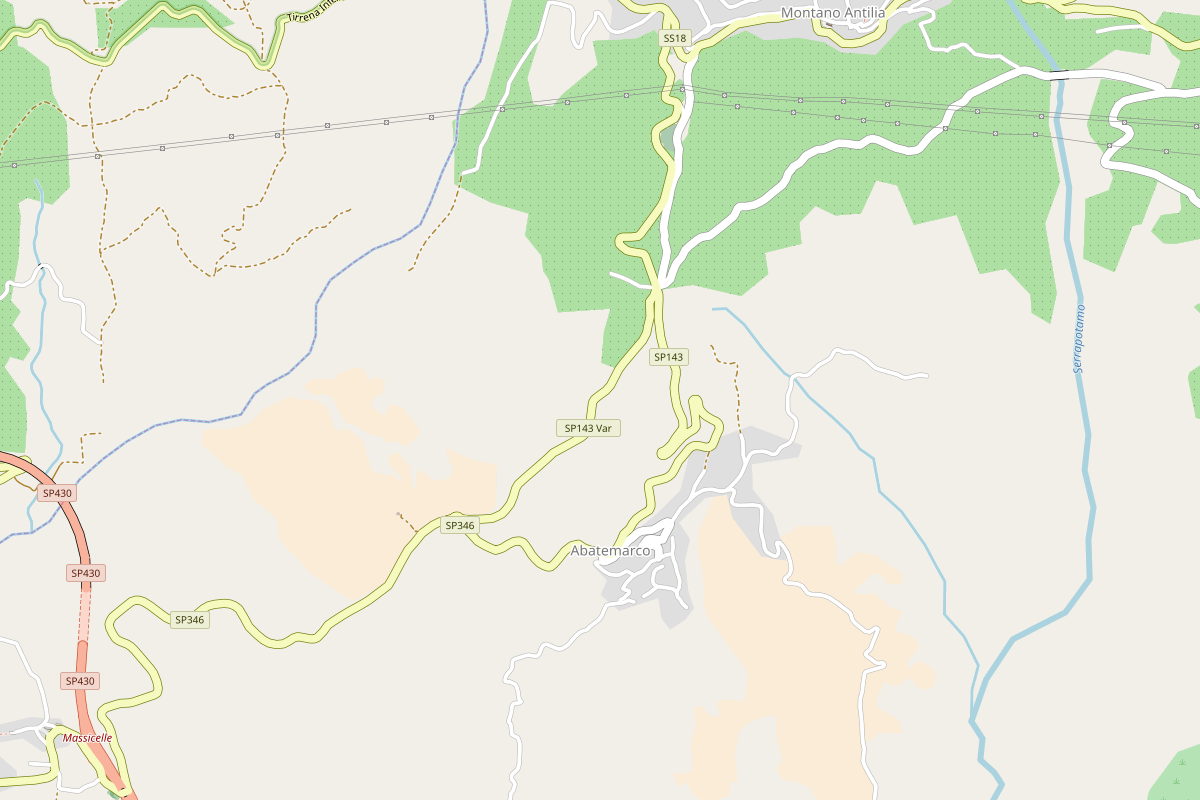
- OSM map of Abatemarco showing the nearby settlements of Massicelle (lower left corner) and Montano Antilia (upper right corner)

- Location of Abatemarco in Italy
- Coordinates: 40°08′39.5″N 15°21′27.7″E
- Country: Italy
- Region: Campania
- Province: Salerno (SA)
- Comune: Montano Antilia
- Elevation: 420 m (1,380 ft)

Population (2011)
  - Total: 309
- Demonym: Abatesi
- Time zone: UTC+1 (CET)
  - Summer (DST): UTC+2 (CEST)
- Postal code: 84060
- Dialing code: (+39) 0974
- Patron saint: St. Roch

Abatemarco is a southern Italian village and hamlet (frazione) of Montano Antilia, a municipality in the province of Salerno, Campania. in 2011 it had a population of 309.

== History ==
The village was founded in Early Middle Ages around the Byzantine church of San Nicola di Mira. It was named after the local abbot (Italian: abate) of Santa Cecilia Monastery, Marco. Anciently focused on the cultivation of flax, Abatemarco passed, through trades, to various local lordships, until becoming part of Montano Antilia from 1811.

== Geography ==
Located in southern Cilento and transcluded into its national park, Abatemarco is a hill village that lies above the Serrapotamo river valley, between Massicelle (4 km southwest) and Montano Antilia (4 km northeast), and spans on the provincial road SP143.

It is 7 km from Futani, 10 from Laurito, 11 from Cuccaro Vetere, 18 from Vallo della Lucania and 22 from Palinuro. The highway exit of "Massicelle", part of the SP430 "Cilentana" Salerno-Sapri, is 3.5 km far.

== Main sights ==
- The Byzantine St. Nicholas of Mira Church (Chiesa di San Nicola di Mira), rebuilt in 1700.
- The Chapel of St. Roch (Cappella di San Rocco), the patron saint.

== See also ==
- Cilentan dialect
