= Campora =

- Comune
- Comune di Campora
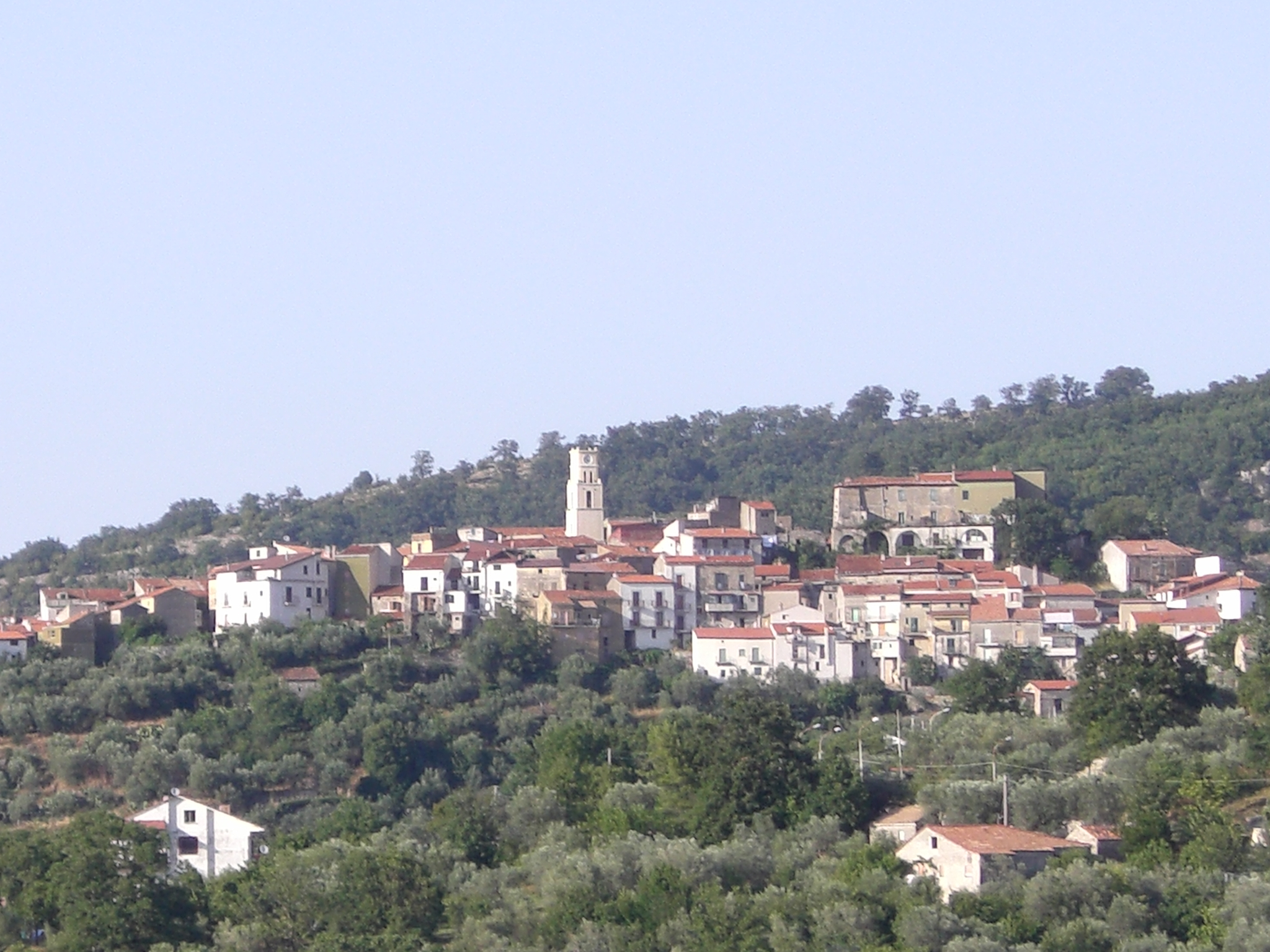
- Panoramic view of Campora

- Location within Italy Location within Campania
- Coordinates: 40°18′N 15°18′E
- Country: Italy
- Region: Campania
- Province: Salerno (SA)

Government
  - Mayor: Giuseppe Vitale (centre-left; elected 14 June 2004)

Area
  - Total: 29 km^{2} (11 sq mi)
- Elevation: 520 m (1,710 ft)

Population (1 May 2009)
  - Total: 492
  - Density: 17/km^{2} (44/sq mi)
- Demonym: Camporesi
- Time zone: UTC+1 (CET)
  - Summer (DST): UTC+2 (CEST)
- Postal code: 84040
- Dialing code: 0974
- ISTAT code: 065023
- Patron saint: Saint Nicholas
- Saint day: 6 December
- Website: Official website

Campora is a town and comune in the province of Salerno, Campania (southern Italy). It is located in the territory of Cilento and as of 2009 its population was 810.

== The Longobard settlement ==
Studies conducted in 2024 by Thomas Allocca, founder and director of the MWA International Research project, aimed at uncovering traces of the early medieval Longobard settlement of Campora, have brought to light territorial evidence suggesting the existence of an extensive and strategic military center. This center was linked to the Longobard county based in what is now the municipality of Corleto Monforte, located at the foot of the Alburni Mountains. These findings have made it possible to formulate hypotheses regarding the settlement's date of foundation, its function, and the Longobard origin of the name Campora. Regarding its founding date, the period between 570 and 580 AD has been proposed. This timeframe is inferred by considering the interval between the establishment of the county (estimated between 570 and 575 AD) and the Longobard conquest of coastal territories held by the Byzantines, which is thought to have occurred around 580-590 AD. Such a conquest would have inevitably required the prior occupation and fortification of the areas between the county seat and the coastal territories, including Campora. Given its geographical location, which allowed for the control of strategic valleys, as well as its abundance of timber, plains suitable for encampments, and the survival of Longobard-derived military toponyms, the Longobard settlement at Campora clearly served a dual purpose: it acted as a defensive barrier, protecting the count from enemy incursions from the sea, and as a military outpost facilitating the county's expansion toward the coast. This dual strategic role must have entailed the presence of an imposing military installation, permanent camps for training, the breeding of warhorses, and, crucially, a high-ranking warrior, a trusted subordinate of the count who would have actively “Longobardized" the formerly Roman territory, beginning with the place names. Regarding the hypothesis that the name Campora has a Longobard rather than a Roman origin, the study of topogenesis developed for Sant'Angelo a Fasanella, as part of the Helfara project directed by Annarita Reina, has served as a model. Sant'Angelo a Fasanella was a Longobard settlement within the same county, and likely Campora, it functioned as a defensive site and an outpost for territorial expansion, even if it was of greater significance. According to the reverse-transliteration hypotheses concerning Longobard anthroponyms, as developed by Thomas Allocca, the most logical origin for the name Campora has been considered Kleph-fara, then evolved into Kleffara > Klefara > Clemfara > Chemfara > Camfora > Campora. The name denotes a territory under the control of the fara (a military clan) of a noble warrior named Kleph, a Germanic-Longobard name attested in 6th-century Italy in the Latinized vernacular form Clefi.

== Geography ==
The village is located in a hilly area in the middle of Cilento, close to Stio and to the area of Pruno, not far from the town of Vallo della Lucania. It borders with the municipalities of Cannalonga, Gioi, Laurino, Moio della Civitella, Novi Velia and Stio.

== See also ==
- Pruno Cilento
- Cilentan language
- Cilento and Vallo di Diano National Park
