= Montano Antilia =

- Comune
- Comune di Montano Antilia
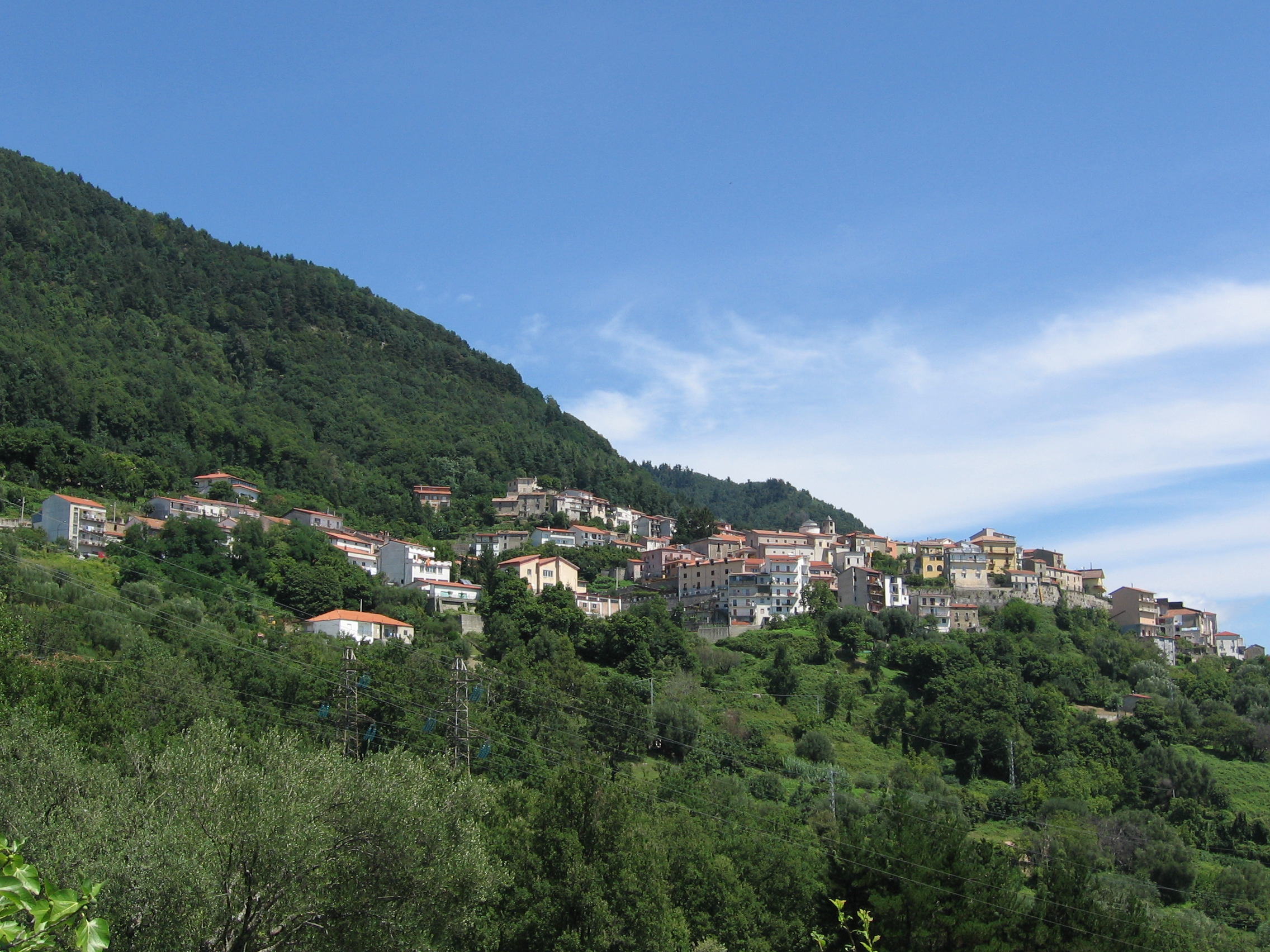

- Coat of arms

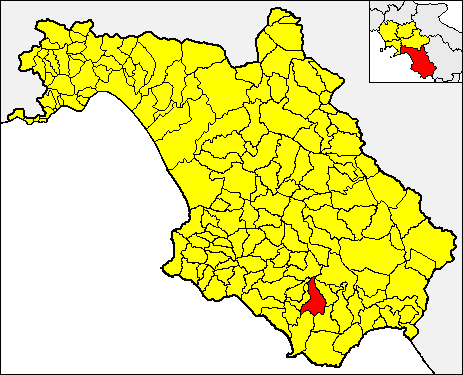
- Montano Antilia within the Province of Salerno

- Location within Italy Location within Campania
- Coordinates: 40°10′N 15°22′E
- Country: Italy
- Region: Campania
- Province: Salerno (SA)
- Frazioni: Abatemarco, Massicelle

Government
  - Mayor: Anna Trivelli

Area
  - Total: 33.44 km^{2} (12.91 sq mi)
- Elevation: 700 m (2,300 ft)

Population (30 November 2017)
  - Total: 2,026
  - Density: 60.59/km^{2} (156.9/sq mi)
- Demonym: Antiliani
- Time zone: UTC+1 (CET)
  - Summer (DST): UTC+2 (CEST)
- Postal code: 84060
- Dialing code: 0974
- Patron saint: St. Sebastian
- Saint day: 20 January
- Website: Official website

Montano Antilia is a town and comune of the province of Salerno in the Campania region of south-west Italy.

== History ==
Originally known as "Montagna" and after "Montana", it was founded on the ruins of an Ancient Greek settlement. It was a casale (i.e. farmstead) belonging to Cuccaro Vetere, first mentioned in a population census of the 16th century.

== Geography ==
Montano Antilia is located in southern Cilento, is part of its national park and borders with the municipalities of Celle di Bulgheria, Centola, Futani, Laurito, Novi Velia, Rofrano and San Mauro la Bruca. Its hamlets (frazioni) are the villages of Abatemarco (pop.: 309) and Massicelle (pop.: 529).

== See also ==
- Cilentan dialect
- Cilentan Coast
