= Villa Littorio =

- Frazione
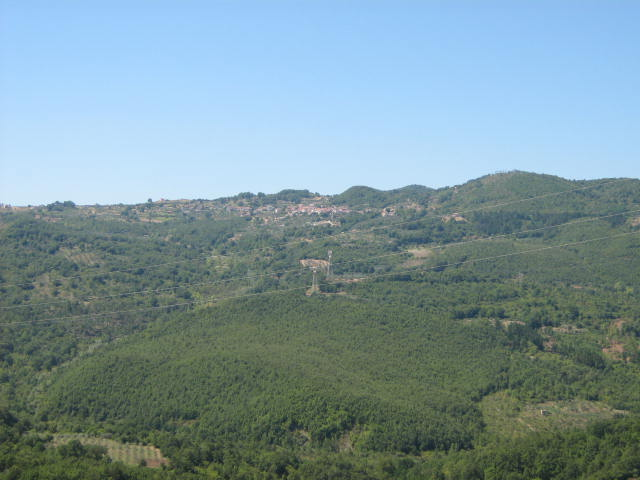
- The rural area surrounding Villa Littorio (in the middle) as seen from Sacco

- Location of Villa Littorio in Italy
- Coordinates: 40°22′4.3″N 15°20′14.32″E
- Country: Italy
- Region: Campania
- Province: Salerno (SA)
- Comune: Laurino
- Elevation: 625 m (2,051 ft)

Population (2009)
  - Total: 612
- Demonym: Villesi
- Time zone: UTC+1 (CET)
  - Summer (DST): UTC+2 (CEST)
- Postal code: 84057
- Dialing code: (+39) 0974

Villa Littorio is an Italian village and hamlet (frazione) of the municipality of Laurino in the Province of Salerno, Campania. As of 2009 its population was of 612.

== History ==
Originally named Fogna (also spelled Fonga), the village counted an ancient Fee named "Santa Maria di Vito a Fogna", that gives the informal name of Vito to the place. It was an autonomous municipality until 1875, when it was annexed to the one of Laurino.

Some years after the rise of Fascism in Italy, in early 1930s its name was changed into the current one, referred to the Fasces (Italian: Fascio Littorio), symbol of the PNF. This change was due to the meaning of fogna: derived from a dialectal word (as fonga) referred to a sort of ravine, in Italian means "sewer" and, colloquially, is a disparaging term. At the end of World War II, despite renaming of all toponyms related to the defunct regime (as the city of Latina, founded as Littoria); Villa Littorio kept the name remaining the only Italian settlement with a fascist toponym.

Partly damaged after the 1980 Irpinia earthquake, the village maintains its historic center, consisting primarily of stone-made houses.

== Geography ==
Located in the middle of Cilento and transcluded into its national park, Villa Littorio is a hill village above the Sammaro river valley, on a little ravine upon the river Pietra. It is 5,5 km far from Laurino, Piaggine and Valle dell'Angelo, 9 from Bellosguardo, 10 from Sacco, 17 from Roscigno and 85 from Salerno. Situated in the northernmost area of its municipality, it is 26 km far from Pruno, the other and the southernmost hamlet of Laurino.

== See also ==
- Cilentan language
