= Cardile =

- Frazione
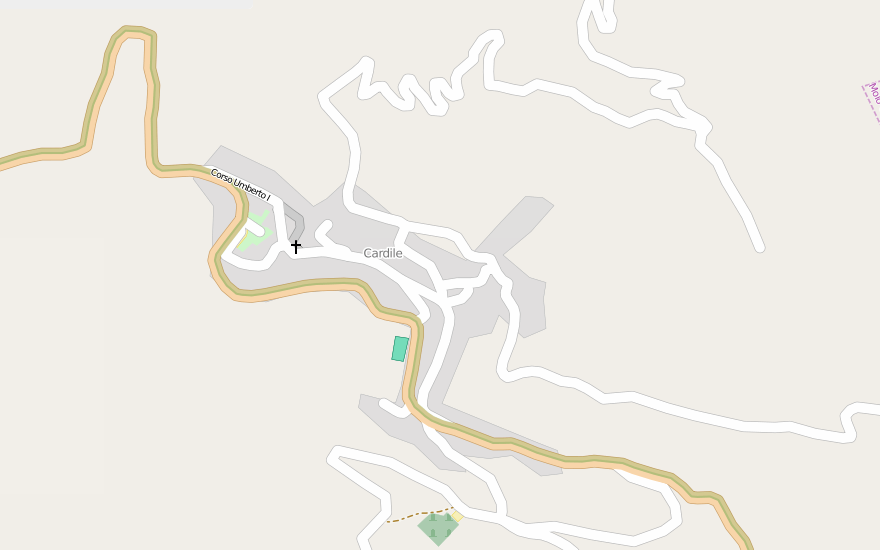
- Village's map (OpenStreetMap)

- Location of Cardile in Italy
- Coordinates: 40°16′15.42″N 15°14′35.2″E
- Country: Italy
- Region: Campania
- Province: Salerno (SA)
- Comune: Gioi
- Elevation: 493 m (1,617 ft)

Population (2009)
  - Total: 614
- Demonym: Cardillesi
- Time zone: UTC+1 (CET)
  - Summer (DST): UTC+2 (CEST)
- Postal code: 84056
- Dialing code: (+39) 0974
- Patron saint: St. John the Baptist
- Website: Official website

Cardile is a southern Italian village and the only hamlet (frazione) of Gioi, a municipality in the province of Salerno, Campania. As of 2009 its population was of 614.

== History ==
The village was founded in the 11th century, around an ancient Lavra Basiliana named "La Laura". In 1754 the village was divided into 3 wards: Piedicardile, in the lower side; Mezzocardile, in the middle; and Capocardile, in the upper side.

== Geography ==
Cardile is located in the middle of Cilento, and is part of its national park. It is a hillside village that lies below the mountains Velosa (943 m) and Tempa del Bosco (908 m), both part of the Southern Apennines.

The village is 6 km from Gioi, 5 from Moio della Civitella, 8 from Vallo della Lucania, 11 from Stio, and 23 from the Ancient Greek town of Velia. Other nearby villages are Pellare (6 km), and Angellara (7 km). A few km south of the village, there are the springs of the Fiumarella, a tributary creek of the river Alento.

== Main sights ==
Some of the sights of Cardile are:

- The Church of St. John the Baptist
- The Baronial Building
- The waterfalls of Fiumarella and the nearby nature trails

== Personalities ==
- Riccio Brothers, involved in the Rebellions of Cilento of 1828

== See also ==
- Cilentan dialect
- Cilento and Vallo di Diano National Park
