= Pruno (Cilento) =

- Frazione
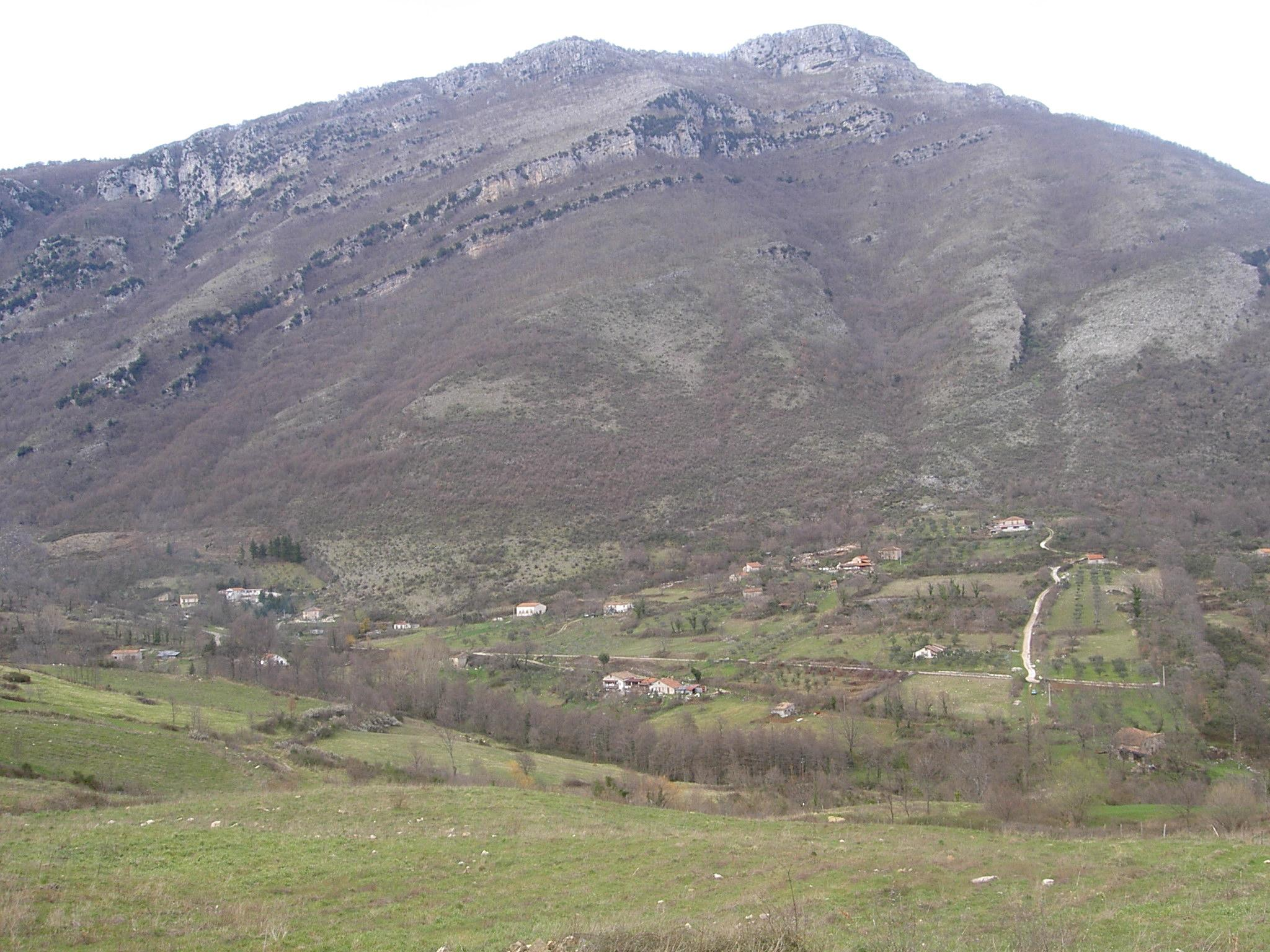
- View of Pruno di Laurino

- Location of Pruno in Italy
- Coordinates: 40°16′N 15°24′E
- Country: Italy
- Region: Campania
- Province: Salerno (SA)
- Comune: Laurino; Valle dell'Angelo; Piaggine
- Elevation: 1,100 m (3,600 ft)

Population
  - Total: 40
- Demonym: Prunesi
- Time zone: UTC+1 (CET)
  - Summer (DST): UTC+2 (CEST)
- Postal code: 84057 (Laurino); 84070 (Valle dell'Angelo); 84065 (Piaggine)
- Dialing code: (+39) 0974

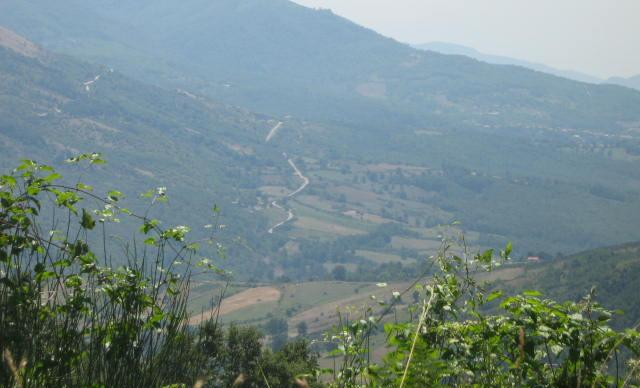
Panorama from the height of "Croce di Pruno"

Pruno is a forest in the Campania region of southern Italy. It is the largest woodlands of central Cilento region. The hamlets (frazioni) with this name are situated in the municipalities of Laurino, Valle dell'Angelo and Piaggine, and are considered a singular village.

Pruno represents one of the most unpolluted natural areas of Campania and one of the lesser inhabited territories of Southern Italy. It is protected within the Cilento and Vallo di Diano National Park, and is part of the Cilento World Heritage Site.

== History ==
The area of Pruno has been inhabited for centuries by farmers. It had two periods of emigration during the end of 19th century and the second half of 20th.

== Geography ==
Pruno is situated in south of the Province of Salerno, in the Cilento and Vallo di Diano National Park. The forest is located between Mount Gelbison and Mount Cervati mounts, at elevations between 600–1,300 metres (2,000–4,300 ft) above mean sea level.

The area is extended not only in the comunes of Valle dell'Angelo, Laurino and Piaggine; but also in Cannalonga, Campora, Rofrano, Sanza, Novi Velia and Monte San Giacomo; and is surrounded by other forest areas. The mountains of the areas are Vesalo, Monaco, Faiatella, Scanno del Tesoro, Raia del Pedale, and Tuzzi di Monte Piano. There are also the springs of Calore River, and some caves with prehistoric rock art.

The middle of the forest is known as Croce di Pruno (Cross of Pruno), a crossroad between the provincial road Piaggine-Rofrano (one of two completely covered with asphalt) and some trails, as the Inghiottitoio (Swallow), to Laurino / Campora (also covered with asphalt), and others to Cannalonga and San Menale. Major plains are the Piana of Roti and Campolongo.

== Villages of Pruno ==
Population in the three rural villages of Pruno amounts almost in 40 inhabitants. It could be considered as a singular scattered village divided into 3 parts, for its common history and also due to a legislative singularity for Italian municipal law.

The villages of Pruno di Valle dell'Angelo and Pruno di Piaggine are situated in the municipal territory of Laurino, but these hamlets are not exclaves of their municipality. However their inhabitants have the citizenship of Valle and Piaggine, and ownership of their houses.

=== Pruno di Laurino ===
Pruno di Laurino (40.261147°N 15.404824°E), locally named simply Pruno, is situated along the Piaggine-Rofrano road, in south of the Croce di Pruno. It is composed by an extended group of circa 15 scattered farmhouses and populated by 25 people. Nearby the village there is a canyon with some little caves (Grotte di Sant'Elena) and the village was interested by the phenomena of the Brigandage in the Two Sicilies in the first half of 19th century. It was in fact the headquarters for a band of brigands guided by Giuseppe Tardio. It is the most populated side of Pruno and counts a rural school closed in 1960s and restored into 2000s as historical building. Its main road belongs to the municipality of Rofrano, consisting in a strip of territory. For this reason the village is sometimes also named Pruno di Rofrano.

=== Pruno di Valle dell'Angelo ===
Pruno di Valle dell'Angelo (40.251993°N 15.395941°E), locally named Pruno Casalettaro, is a rural village, one of the last in Europe. It is located in a detour of Piaggine-Rofrano road, on a trail to Cannalonga and close to the canyon of Quarantana river. It is composed of circa 8 farmhouses and populated by 12–15 ancient people, with a rhythm of life similar to the one of 19th century, where electrical energy was fasted only in 1992. The community, dedicated to animal husbandry and agriculture, is de facto autonomous and the village is indicated as a point of touristic interest.

=== Pruno di Piaggine ===
Pruno di Piaggine (40.241929°N 15.389606°E), locally named Pruno Chiainaro, is the smallest of the three villages. It is situated on a trial from Pruno di Valle dell'Angelo to Rofrano via San Menale, below the trial to Cannalonga and nearby the canyon of Quarantana. It is composed by some scattered farmhouses and the population amounts of 10 inhabitants circa. A few km west it is the municipal border of Novi Velia, below the area of Gelbison mountain.

== Gallery ==
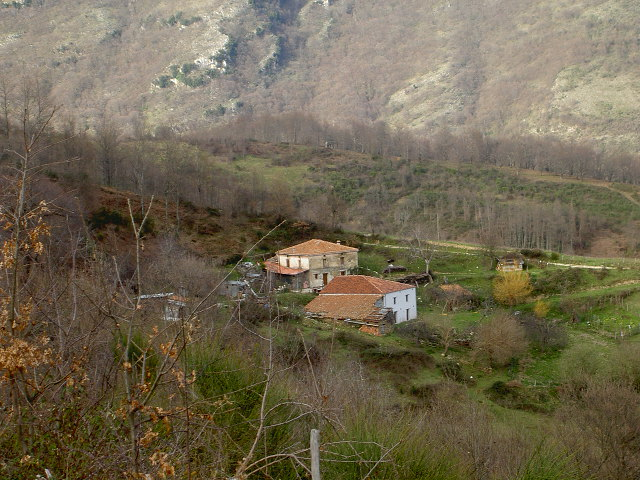
View of Pruno
di Valle dell'Angelo

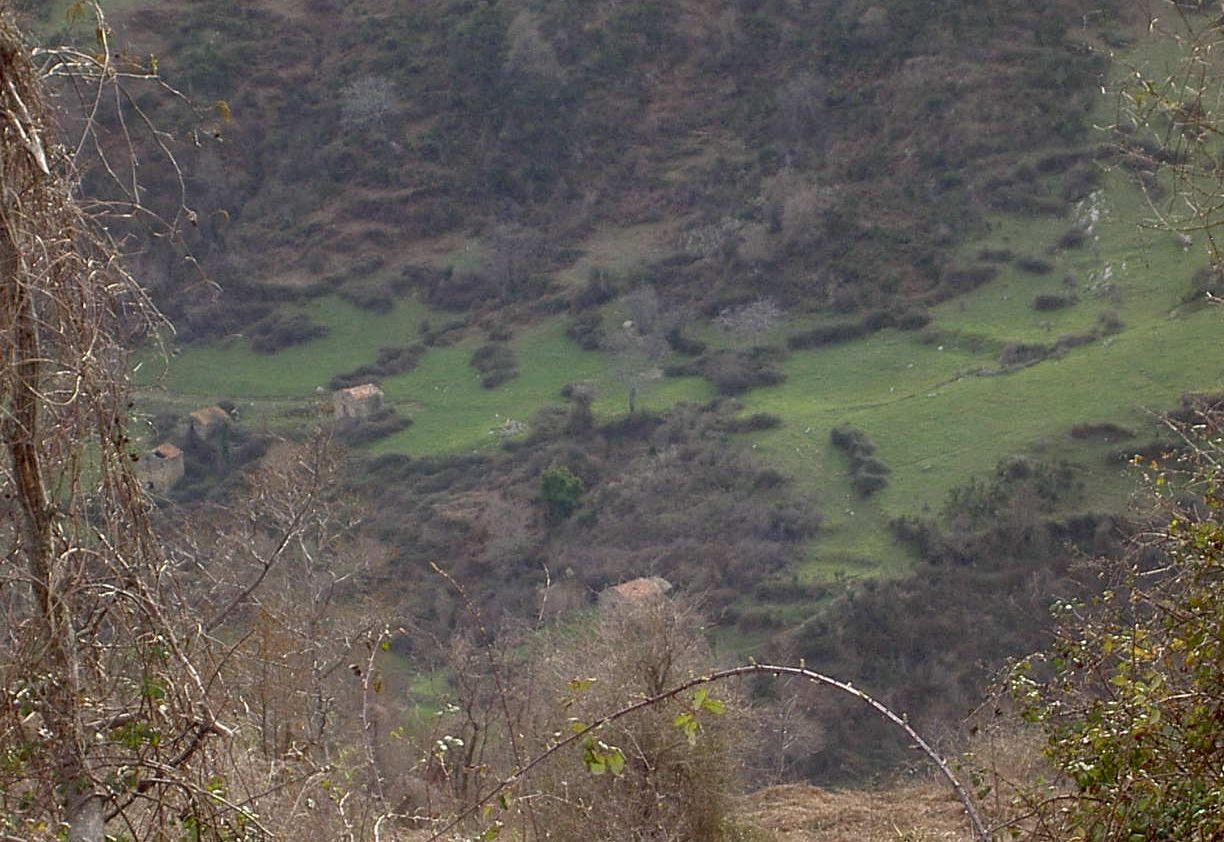
View of Pruno di Piaggine

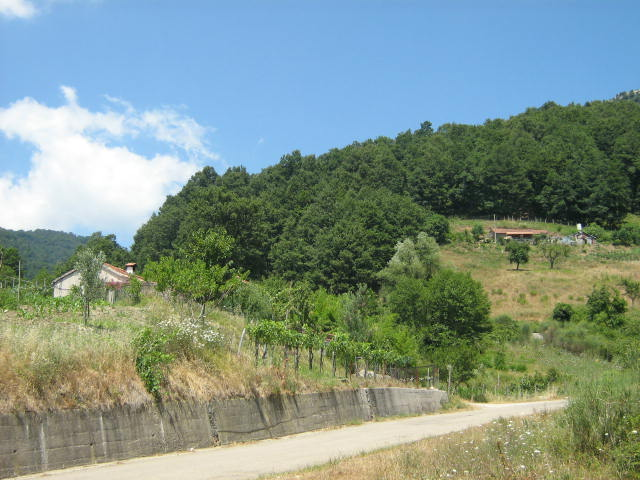
Farmhouse in
Pruno di Laurino

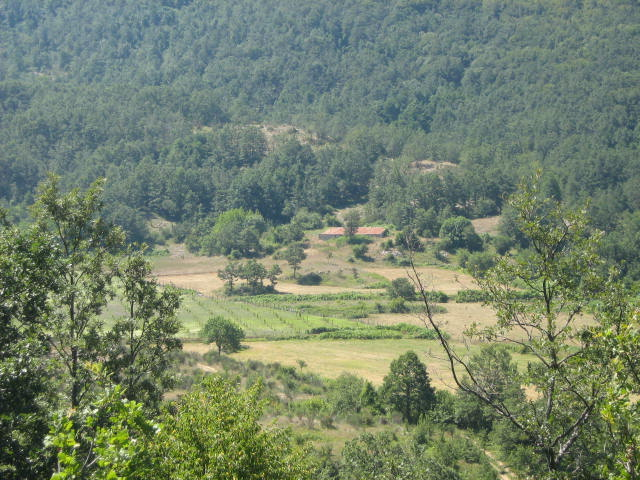
Farmhouse near Pruno
di Valle dell'Angelo

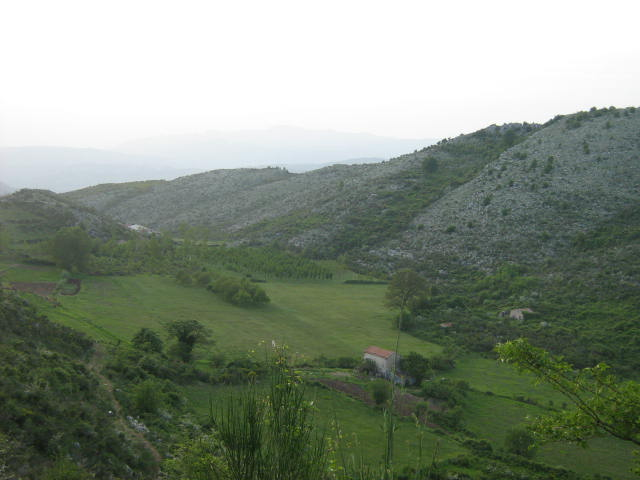
Farmhouse near
Pruno di Piaggine

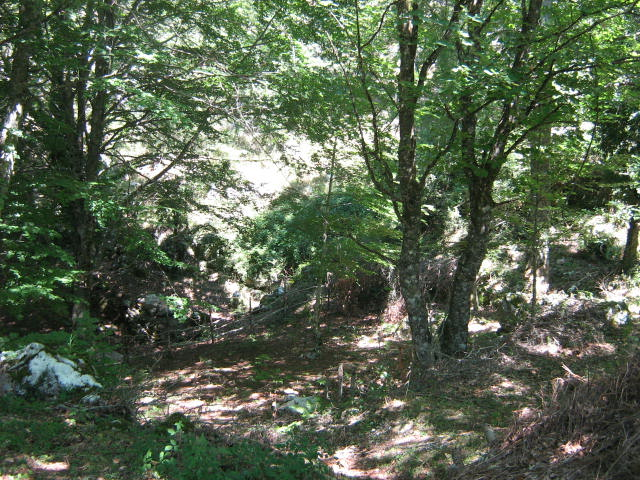
Forest area in
Croce di Pruno

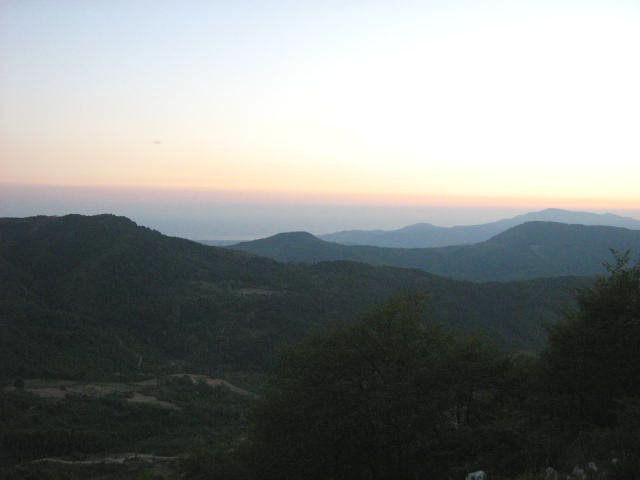
Sunset on the road
upon Mount Vesalo

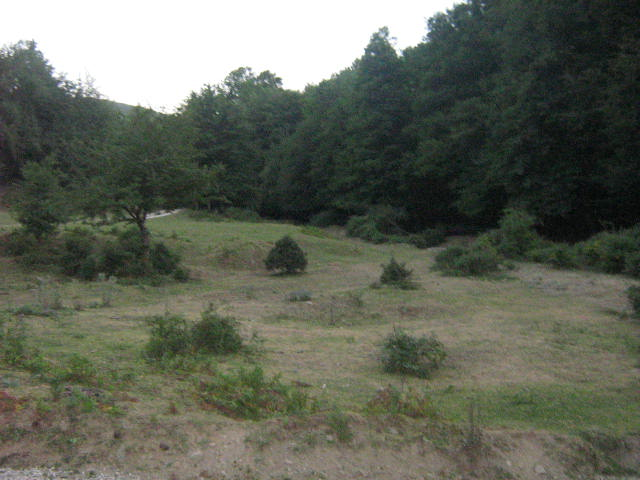
Green plain on the road
upon Monte Vesalo

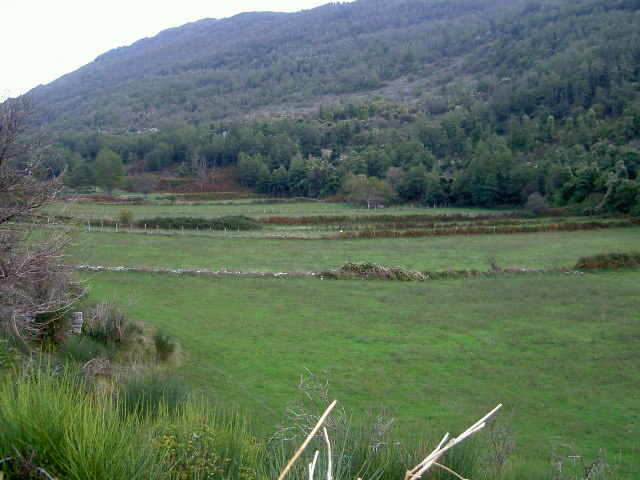
Piana di Roti

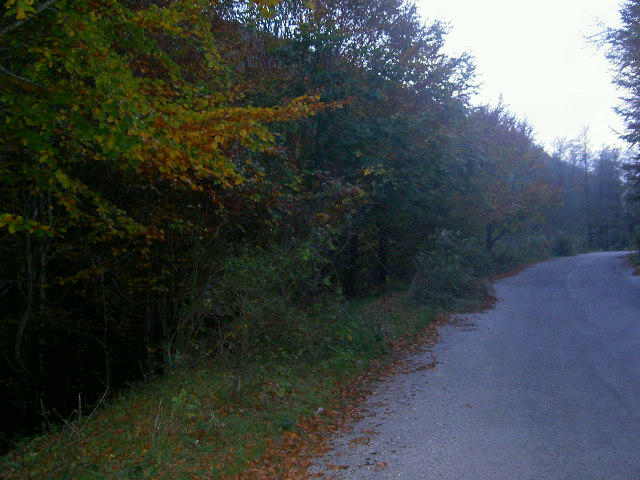
A wood nearby
Piana di Campolongo

== See also ==
- Cilento
- Villa Littorio
- Cilentan language
- Cilento and Vallo di Diano National Park
