= Angelo Patri =

Italian-American author and educator

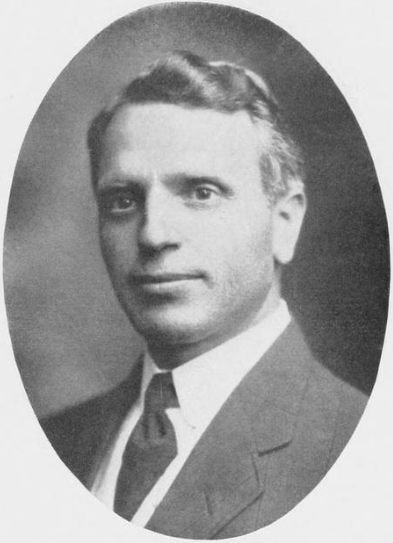
- Born: Angelo Petraglia; November 26, 1876; Piaggine, Campania, Italy
- Died: September 13, 1965 (aged 88); Danbury, Connecticut, US
- Education: College of the City of New York; Columbia University
- Occupation(s): Writer, educator

Angelo Patri (né Petraglia; November 26, 1876 – September 13, 1965) was an Italian-American author and educator.

== Biography ==
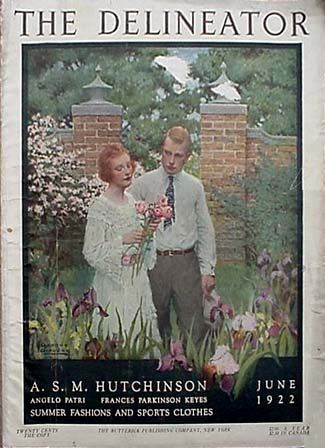
An Angelo Patri article was featured in The Delineator for June 1922

His original surname was Petraglia, and he was born in Piaggine, Salerno, in southern Italy. Patri came to the United States when he was five. He gained a B.A. at the College of the City of New York in 1897, and an M.A. at Columbia University in 1904. A schoolteacher in New York from 1898 to 1908, he may have been the first Italian-born American to become a school principal in the United States. In attempting to engage the student with tasks that went beyond book learning, he was influenced by the writings of John Dewey. From 1908 to 1913 he was principal of Public School No. 4, and in 1913 he became principal of Public School 45, Bronx, New York. He wrote a syndicated column, "Our Children", on child psychology, for newspapers and magazines. He died in Danbury, Connecticut on September 13, 1965.

The Angelo Patri Middle School, MS 391 in the Bronx, is named in his honor.

== Works ==
=== Books for parents and teachers ===
- A Schoolmaster of the Great City, 1917
- The School That Everybody Wants, 1922
- Child Training, 1922
- "Talks to Mothers", 1923 (Presented with the compliments of 'The Thomas Dalby Company' Watertown. Mass.)
- School and Home, 1925
- Problem of Childhood, 1926
- What Have You Got to Give?, 1926
- The Questioning Child, 1928
- Your Children In Wartime, 1943
- How to help your child grow up (Chicago: Rand McNally, 1948)

=== Books for children ===
- White Patch, 1911
- Pinocchio in Africa, 1911 (tr.)
- Spirit of America, 1924
- Pinocchio in America, 1928
- The Adventures of Pinocchio, 1937 (tr.)
