= Littorio =

Littorio (Italian for lictor) may refer to:

== Military ==
- 2nd Division "Littorio", infantry division of the Italian Social Republic's Republican National Army
- 4th Division "Littorio", fully motorized Italian infantry division which participated in the Spanish Civil War
- 133 Armored Division Littorio, Italian armoured division during World War II
- Littorio-class battleship, class of battleship of the Regia Marina, the Italian navy, also known as the Vittorio Veneto class
  - Italian battleship Littorio, ship of this class which served during World War II

== Sporting venues ==
- Littorio Circuit, motor racing circuit around the Littorio airfield, used in the 1930s
- Arena Garibaldi – Stadio Romeo Anconetani, stadium in Pisa, Italy, known as Campo Littorio between 1931 and 1949
- Stadio Franco Ossola, stadium in Varese, Italy, known as Stadio del Littorio between 1925 and 1950
- Stadio Giuseppe Grezar, stadium in Trieste, Italy, known as Stadio Littorio between 1932 and 1943
- Stadio Renzo Barbera, stadium in Palermo, Italy, known as Stadio Littorio between 1932 and 1936
- Stadio Gino Pistoni, stadium in Ivrea, Italy, known as Stadio Littorio between 1934 and 1945

== Other ==
- Littorio Airport, the original name for the Rome-Urbe Airport
- Stile Littorio, Italian architectural style, developed during the late Fascist period, inspired by ancient Roman architecture
- Villa Littorio, an Italian village and hamlet of Laurino (SA), Campania

== See also ==
- Littoria, name of the Italian city of Latina from 1932 to 1946
