= Moio della Civitella =

- Comune
- Comune di Moio della Civitella
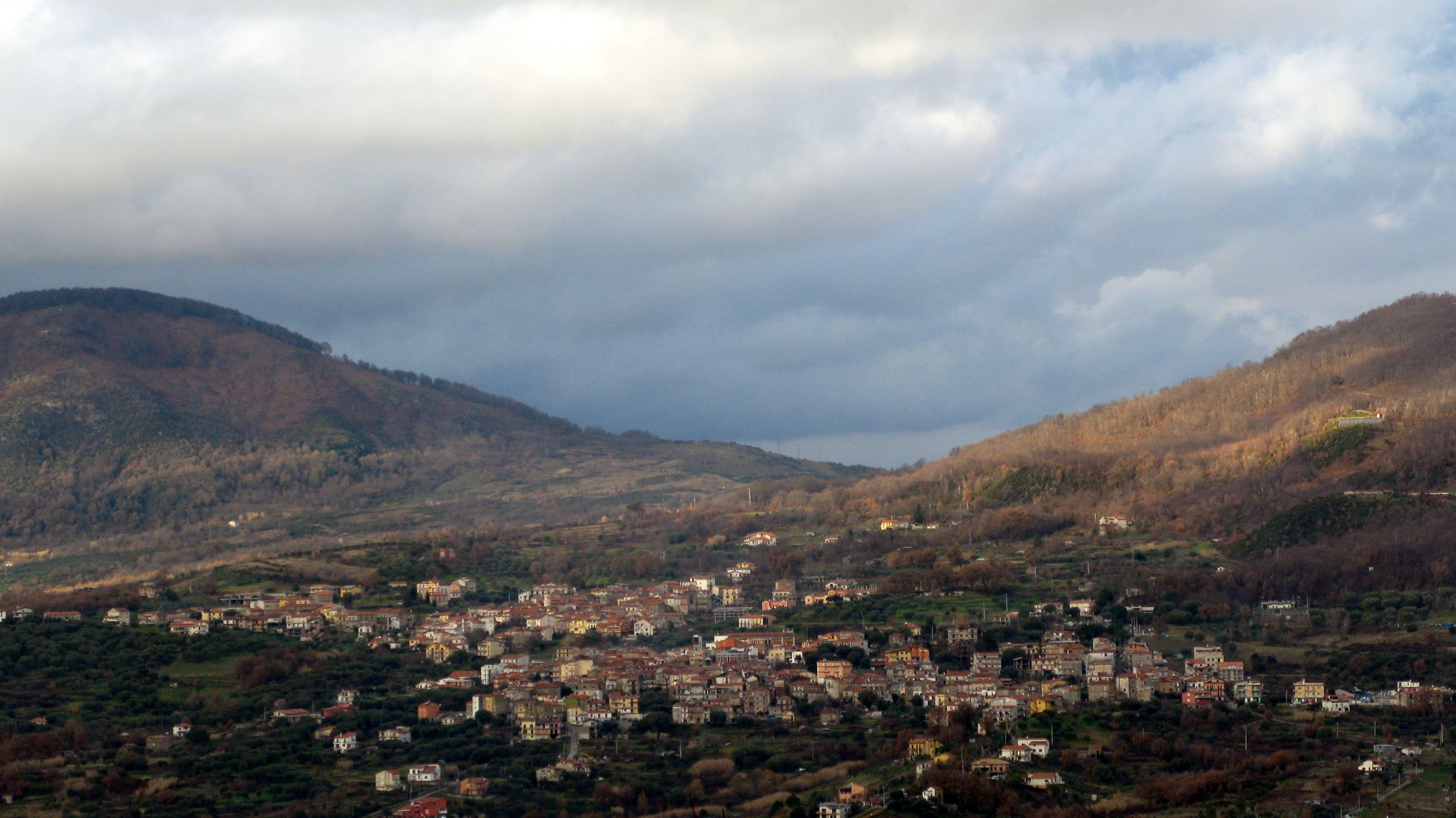
- The town of Moio della Civitella with its frazione Pellare

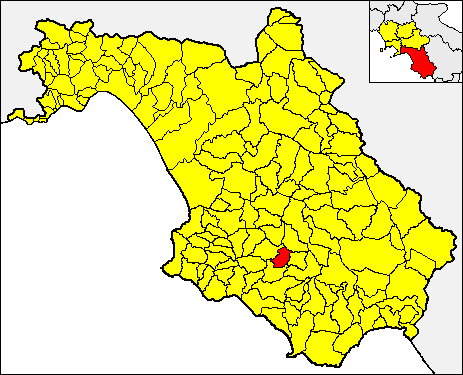
- Moio della Civitella within the Province of Salerno

- Location within Italy Location within Campania
- Coordinates: 40°15′N 15°16′E
- Country: Italy
- Region: Campania
- Province: Salerno (SA)
- Frazioni: Pellare

Government
  - Mayor: Antonio Gnarra (Lista Civica)

Area
  - Total: 16.94 km^{2} (6.54 sq mi)
- Elevation: 515 m (1,690 ft)

Population (December 2009)
  - Total: 1,929
  - Density: 113.9/km^{2} (294.9/sq mi)
- Demonym(s): Mojicani (for Moio proper); Pellaresi (for Pellare)
- Time zone: UTC+1 (CET)
  - Summer (DST): UTC+2 (CEST)
- Postal code: 84060
- Dialing code: 0974
- Patron saint: Santa Veneranda
- Saint day: 26 July
- Website: Official website

Moio della Civitella is a town and comune in the province of Salerno in the Campania region of south-western Italy.

== Geography ==
Located in the middle of Cilento, Moio borders with the municipalities of Campora, Cannalonga, Gioi, and Vallo della Lucania. It counts a single hamlet (frazione), that is the nearby village of Pellare. The nearest towns and villages are Vallo della Lucania (3,5 km), Cannalonga (4 km), Angellara (2,5 km), and Cardile (5 km).

== See also ==
- Cilentan dialect
- Cilento and Vallo di Diano National Park
