= Alfano =

- Comune
- Comune di Alfano
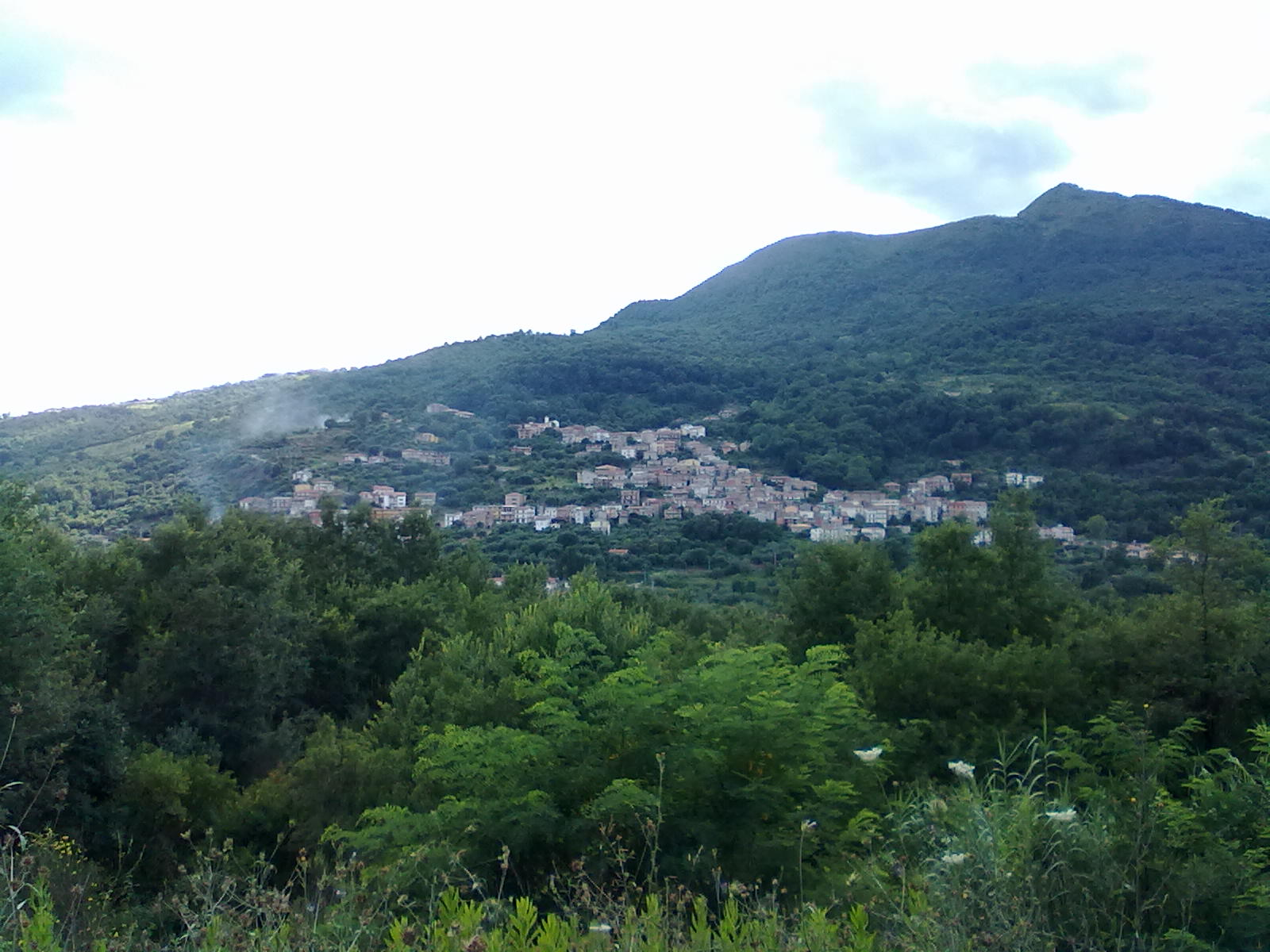

- Coat of arms

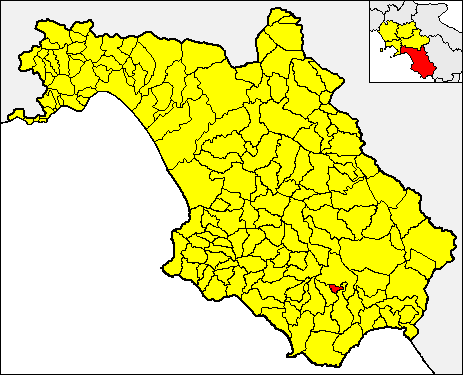
- Alfano within the Province of Salerno

- Location of Alfano in Italy Alfano (Campania)
- Coordinates: 40°11′N 15°25′E
- Country: Italy
- Region: Campania
- Province: Salerno (SA)

Government
  - Mayor: Amelia Viterale (Lista Civica)

Area
  - Total: 4 km^{2} (1.5 sq mi)
- Elevation: 250 m (820 ft)

Population (1 December 2012)
  - Total: 1,082
  - Density: 270/km^{2} (700/sq mi)
- Demonym: Alfanesi
- Time zone: UTC+1 (CET)
  - Summer (DST): UTC+2 (CEST)
- Postal code: 84040
- Dialing code: 0974
- ISTAT code: 065004
- Patron saint: Sophia of Rome and Matthew the Evangelist
- Saint day: December 6 (Saint Nicholas)
- Website: Official website

Alfano (Cilentan: Alfànu) is a village and small comune in the province of Salerno in the Campania region of south-western Italy. As of December 31, 2012, the comune had a population of 1082.

== History ==
There is little reliable evidence on the ancient history of Alfano. However, according to tradition, a large city existed on the slopes of Mount Centaurino, near the present frazione of Roccagloriosa. This would have been destroyed in a catastrophic earthquake, if it had existed.

In 1496 the town was given to the Neapolitan noble Giovanni Carafa, Duke of Paliano.

== Geography ==
Alfano has borders with the municipalities of Laurito, Roccagloriosa and Rofrano.

== Main sights ==
The main church in Alfano is the Church of Saint Nicholas. The baronial Novelli Palace dates back to the 18th century. It has a grand entrance of stone, leading to a hall. For some time, Novelli Palace served as the Town Hall of Alfano.

Palazzo dei Baroni Speranza, another palace, belonged to the Baron Speranza di Laurito. This palace, a large building complex elevated above the town, contains a central courtyard.

== Economy ==
The commune is a renowned producer of wine, despite the soils being amongst the poorest in the country due to the harsh, dry climate of the territory. Local grape varieties were introduced to Elea and Paestum by ancient Greek colonists and adapted to grow in clay-calcareous soils and the climate of the area.

The Cilento brand of wine was established on May 3, 1989, and is produced in three varieties. Paying homage the Ancient Greek colonists in Paestum and the viniculture experienced there, on November 22, 1995, the brand of wine Paestum went into production.
