= Sacco, Campania =

Sacco
- Comune
- Comune di Sacco
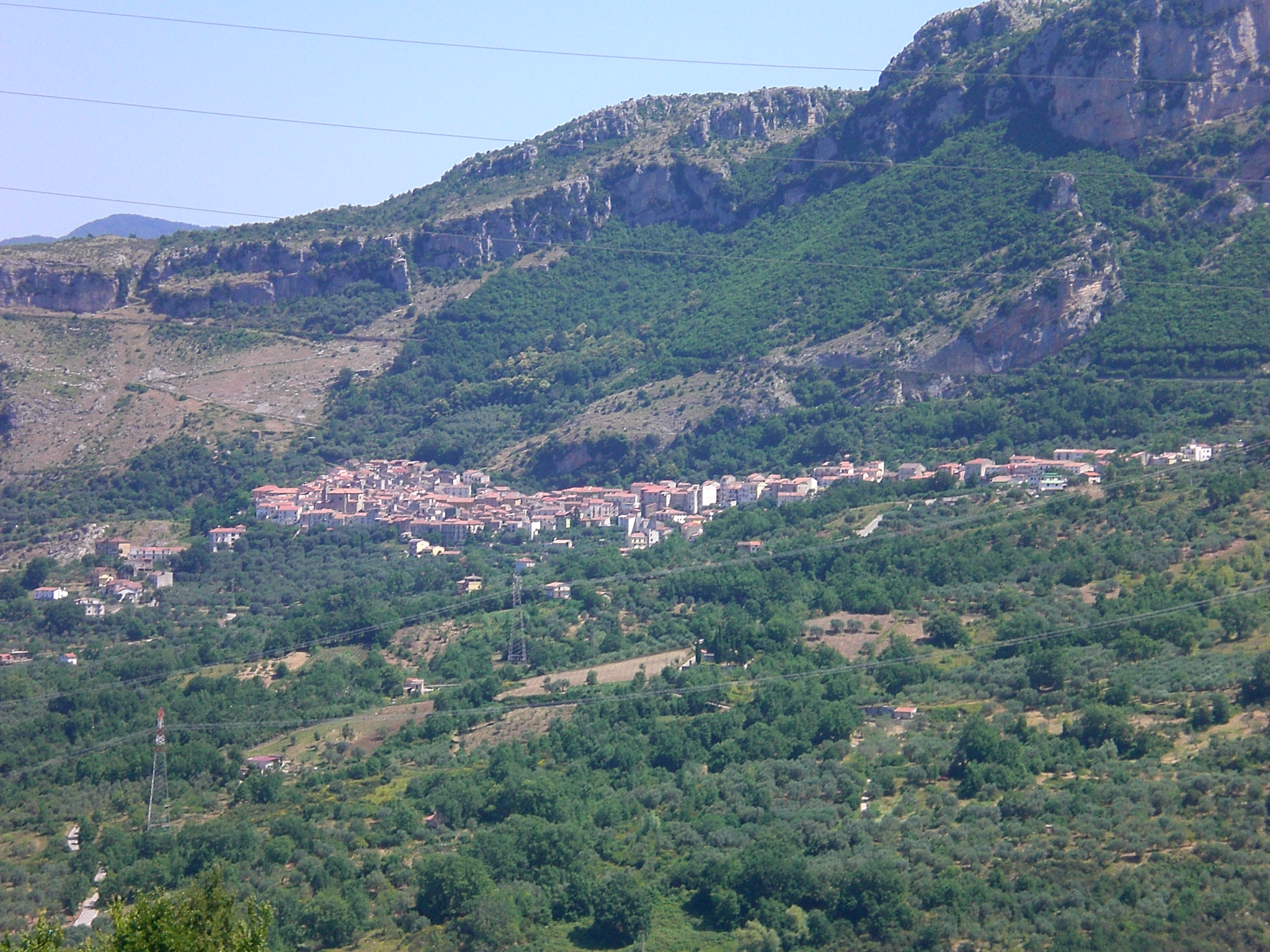

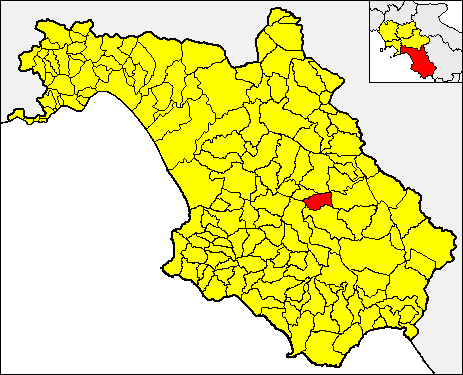
- Sacco within the Province of Salerno

- Location within Italy Location within Campania
- Coordinates: 40°22′43.07″N 15°22′41.23″E
- Country: Italy
- Region: Campania
- Province: Salerno (SA)

Government
  - Mayor: Franco LaTempa

Area
  - Total: 23 km^{2} (8.9 sq mi)
- Elevation: 500 m (1,600 ft)

Population (Dec. 2011)
  - Total: 582
  - Density: 25/km^{2} (66/sq mi)
- Demonym: Saggesi or Saccatari
- Time zone: UTC+1 (CET)
  - Summer (DST): UTC+2 (CEST)
- Postal code: 84070
- Dialing code: 0974
- Website: Official website

Sacco is a town and comune in the province of Salerno in the Campania region of south-western Italy. As of 2011, its population was 582.

== Geography ==
Located in the central-eastern area of Cilento and near the Alburni mountain range, the municipality borders with Corleto Monforte, Laurino, Piaggine, Roscigno and Teggiano. It has no hamlets (frazioni). The town is located near the spring of the river Sammaro.

== See also ==
- Cilentan language
- Cilento and Vallo di Diano National Park
