= Futani =

- Comune
- Comune di Futani
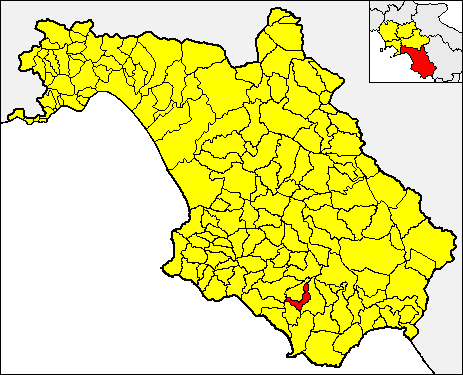
- Futani within the Province of Salerno

- Location within Italy Location within Campania
- Coordinates: 40°9′N 15°19′E
- Country: Italy
- Region: Campania
- Province: Salerno (SA)
- Frazioni: Castinatelli, Eremiti

Area
  - Total: 14 km^{2} (5.4 sq mi)
- Elevation: 431 m (1,414 ft)

Population (1 April 2009)
  - Total: 1,300
  - Density: 93/km^{2} (240/sq mi)
- Demonym: Futanari or Futanesi
- Time zone: UTC+1 (CET)
  - Summer (DST): UTC+2 (CEST)
- Postal code: 84050
- Dialing code: 0974-953012
- ISTAT code: 065054
- Patron saint: San Marco
- Saint day: 25 April
- Website: Official website

Futani is a town and comune in the province of Salerno in the Campania region of south-western Italy.

== Geography ==
The town lies in southern Cilento, on the national road "SS 18" between Cuccaro Vetere and Massicelle. It borders with the municipalities of Ceraso, Cuccaro Vetere, Montano Antilia, Novi Velia and San Mauro la Bruca.

== See also ==
- Cilentan dialect
- Cilento and Vallo di Diano National Park
