= Octavio M. Salati =

Octavio Salati
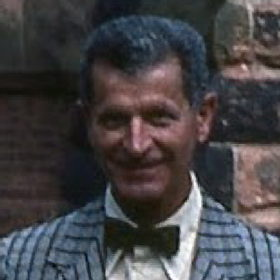
- Born: December 12, 1914; Philadelphia, Pennsylvania, U.S.
- Died: January 28, 2001 (aged 86); Media, Pennsylvania, U.S.
- Other name: Tav Salati
- Occupations: Engineer, academic and educator
- Known for: BNC connector development

Octavio M. "Tav" Salati (December 12, 1914 – January 28, 2001) was an American engineer, academic and educator. He served as Professor of Electrical Engineering at the University of Pennsylvania in the field of Electromagnetic Compatibility.

== Background and personal life ==
Salati was born to Armando Salati and Julia LaFazia in Philadelphia, Pennsylvania. Tav married Marie Pattani (1919–2010) and they had three children.

== Career ==
Tav Salati received his Bachelor of Science in Electrical Engineering from the University of Pennsylvania in 1936. Following graduation, he was employed by Philco Radio and Television Company, Radio Corporation of America, C.G. Conn Ltd., and Hazeltine Corporation. Tav returned to the Moore School of Electrical Engineering as a research associate in 1948, received his PhD from the University of Pennsylvania in 1963, and became professor of electrical engineering in 1975. Dr. Salati was made a Fellow of the IEEE in 1975, and he retired from Penn in 1984.

== Role in BNC connector development ==
While working at Hazeltine Corporation, Dr. Salati was awarded United States patent #2,540,012 which was the basis for what is now commonly known as the BNC connector. The patent for Electrical Connector was filed May 19, 1945, issued January 30, 1951, and invalidated by the courts in 1958. BNC is an acronym for Bayonet Neill Constant. The BNC connector is still in common use for coaxial cables that carry high frequency currents between pieces of electronics and communications equipment. Canadian patent #487446 was also awarded to Dr. Salati for this invention on October 21, 1952.

== Publications ==
The Applicability of Signal Density Studies in Interference Prediction, University of Pennsylvania, 1963

Electromagnetic Compatibility, University of Pennsylvania, 1965

Compatibility Studies, Defense Technical Information Center, 1968

Grounding Principles for NORAD Cheyenne Mountain Complex, Defense Technical Information Center, 1974

Modern Microwave Measurements, University of Pennsylvania, 1982

== Other patents ==
Important Quantity Selecting Circuit, U.S. patent #2,666,152, January 12, 1954

Voltage Level Indicator, U.S. patent #2,706,257, April 12, 1955

Relay Selecting Circuit, U.S. patent #2,712,101, June 28, 1955

Assignment Cancelling Circuit, U.S. patent #2,716,206, August 23, 1955

== See also ==
- Electromagnetic compatibility
- BNC connector
- Coaxial cable
