= Leo de Berardinis =

Italian stage actor and theatre director

- Born: 3 January 1940; Gioi, Italy
- Died: 18 September 2008 (aged 68); Rome, Italy
- Occupations: Stage actor, theatre director
- Years active: 1967-2001

External image
- A picture of Leo de Berardinis

Leo de Berardinis (3 January 1940 – 18 September 2008) was an Italian stage actor and theatre director. He was an important exponent of the Italian avant-garde theatre.

== Biography and career ==
Born in Gioi, a village in southern Campania, de Berardinis grew up in the Apulian city of Foggia. After his first experiences as stage actor in the company of Carlo Quartucci, he started his collaboration with Perla Peragallo and, in 1968, he collaborated to the play Don Quixote of Carmelo Bene. During the 1970s, he moved to Marigliano, near Naples, with Perla Peregallo, in which he created several plays of improvisational theatre. In 1983 he collaborated with the Cooperativa Nuova Scena of Bologna and staged several Shakespearian plays, as Hamlet, King Lear and The Tempest. In 1987 he founded the company "Teatro di Leo" (i.e.: Leo's Theatre), which produced shows, workshops and meetings.

In 1994 de Bernardinis directed the St. Leonard Theatre of Bologna and, from 1994 to 1997, took over the artistic direction of the theater's Festival of Santarcangelo di Romagna. On 4 May 2001 he received the honorary degree of the University of Bologna, for the academic discipline of humanities.

On 16 June 2001, de Berardinis went into a coma after a plastic surgery, due to an error by an anesthesiologist. After seven years in a coma, he died in Rome on 18 September 2008. He died in Rome.

== Works ==
Plays:

- 1967: La faticosa messinscena dell'"Amleto" di William Shakespeare (with Perla Peragallo)
- 1968: Sir and Lady Macbeth (with Perla Peragallo)
- 1972: O' Zappatore (with Perla Peragallo)
- 1973: Sir and Lady Macbeth (II edizione) (with Perla Peragallo)
- 1973: King Lacreme Lear Napulitane (with Perla Peragallo)
- 1974: Sudd (with Perla Peragallo)
- 1974: Chianto 'e risate e risate 'e chianto (with Perla Peragallo)
- 1976: Rusp spers (with Perla Peragallo)
- 1977: Assoli (with Perla Peragallo)
- 1977: Tre Jurni (with Perla Peragallo)
- 1978: Avita Murì (with Perla Peragallo)
- 1978: Sciopero autonomo (with Perla Peragallo)
- 1979: De Berardinis - Peragallo (with Perla Peragallo)
- 1980: Udunda Indina (with Perla Peragallo)
- 1980: XXXIII Canto del Paradiso da Dante (with Perla Peragallo)
- 1981: Annabel Lee da Edgar Allan Poe (with Perla Peragallo)
- 1981: Leo De Berardinis Re
- 1982: Gethsemani
- 1982: William Shakespeare e il Conte di Southampton in ruoli invertiti
- 1982: Apocalisse
- 1982: Il cervello esploso
- 1983: Kiat'amore
- 1983: The Connection (by Jack Gelber)
- 1984: Amleto; Dante Alighieri. Studi e variazioni
- 1985: King Lear. Studi e variazioni; Il Cantico dei cantici; Amleto (II edizione)
- 1986: La Tempesta; Il ritorno, riflessi da Omero-Joyce
- 1987: Novecento e mille; La Tempesta (II edizione)
- 1987: Delirio
- 1987: L'uomo capovolto
- 1988: Macbeth; Novecento e mille (II edizione)
- 1988: Il fiore del deserto da Giacomo Leopardi
- 1988: Quintett da Orfeo, Empedocle, Eschilo, Sofocle, Ranieri de' Calzabigi, Rimbaud
- 1989: Ha da passa' 'a nuttata dall'opera di Eduardo De Filippo
- 1990: Metamorfosi
- 1990: Totò, principe di Danimarca
- 1991: L'Impero della Ghisa
- 1991: Lo spazio della memoria
- 1992: IV e V atto dell' "Otello" di William Shakespeare
- 1993: Totò, principe di Danimarca (II edizione)
- 1994: Il ritorno di Scaramouche di Jean-Baptiste Poquelin e Leòn de Berardin
- 1996: King Lear n. 1 da William Shakespeare
- 1998: Lear Opera da William Shakespeare
- 1999: Past Eve and Adam's

== See also ==
- Experimental theatre
