= Monte Miletto =

Mountain in Italy

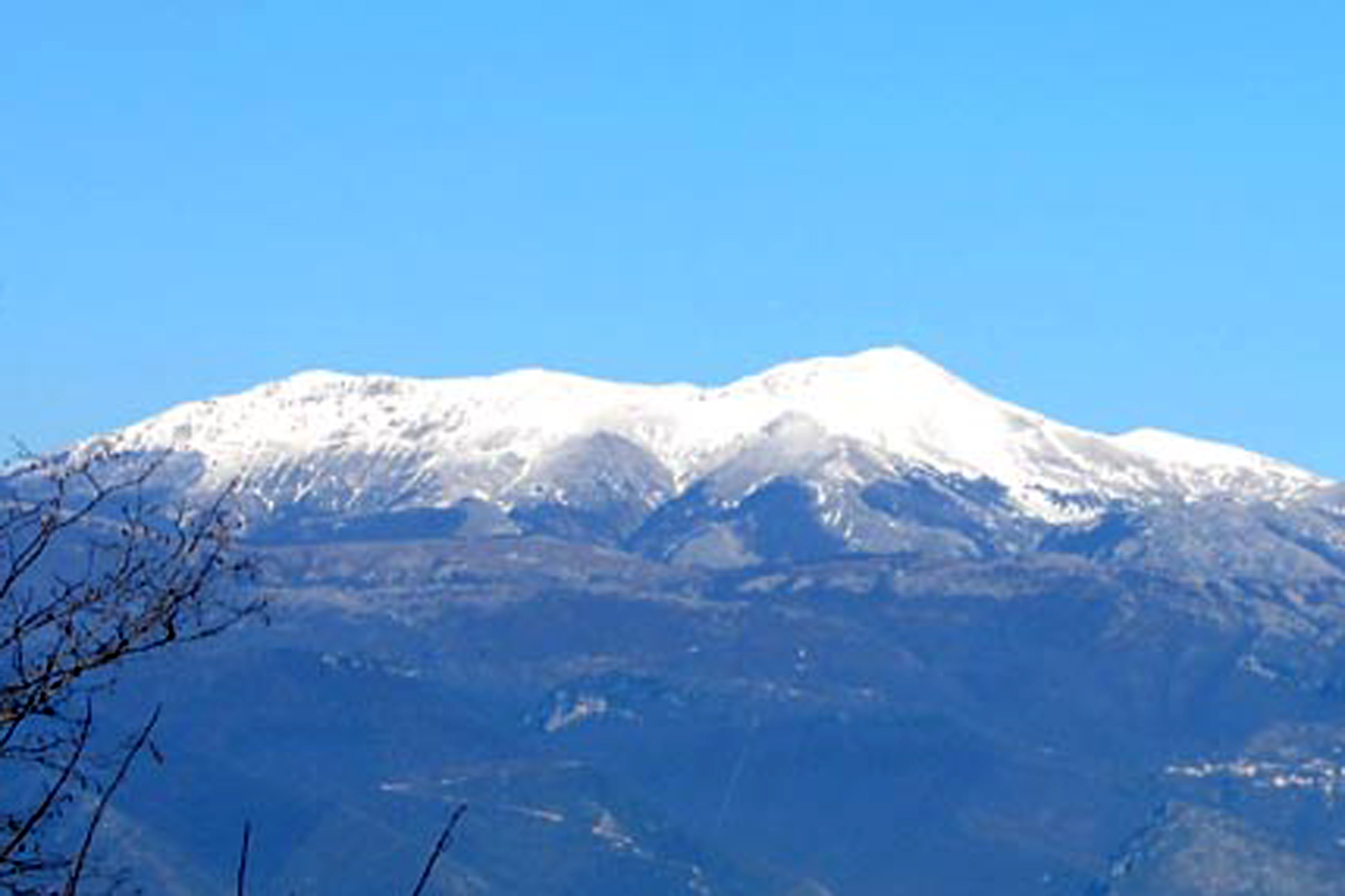

Highest point
- Elevation: 2,050 m (6,730 ft)
- Prominence: 1,306 m (4,285 ft)
- Isolation: 40.8 km (25.4 mi)
- Listing: Ribu
- Coordinates: 41°26′N 14°22′E

Geography
- Location within Italy
- Location: Molise, Italy

Monte Miletto is a mountain of Molise, Italy. It has an elevation of 2,050 metres above sea level.
