= Cervati =

Mountain in Salerno, Italy

UNESCO World Heritage Site
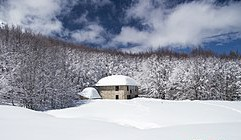
- View of Mount Cervati

- Location within Campania Location within Italy
- Location: Province of Salerno, Campania, Italy
- Part of: "Paestum, Velia, the Certosa di Padula, Mount Cervati and the Vallo di Diano" part of Cilento and Vallo di Diano National Park with the Archeological Sites of Paestum and Velia, and the Certosa di Padula
- Criteria: Cultural: (iii)(iv)
- Reference: 842-001
- Inscription: 1998 (22nd Session)
- Coordinates: 40°20′N 15°32′E

Cervati or Monte Cervati is an Italian mountain of the Province of Salerno, Campania.

== Geography ==
The mountain is located in the north-western side of the municipality of Sanza, close to the forest area of Pruno. It is the source of the river Bussento.

With 1,898 amsl it is the highest mountain of Cilento, followed by Panormo (part of Alburni range, 1,742 amsl), Faiatella (1,710) and Gelbison (1,705). It is also the second highest mountain of Campania, after the Monte Miletto of Matese (2,050), located partly in Molise.

== Geology ==
Cervati is an extinct volcano. The last eruption from the volcano is unknown.

== See also ==
- Gelbison
- Alburni
- Stella
- Apennine Mountains
