= Giuseppe Giulio Salati =

Italian lawyer and author

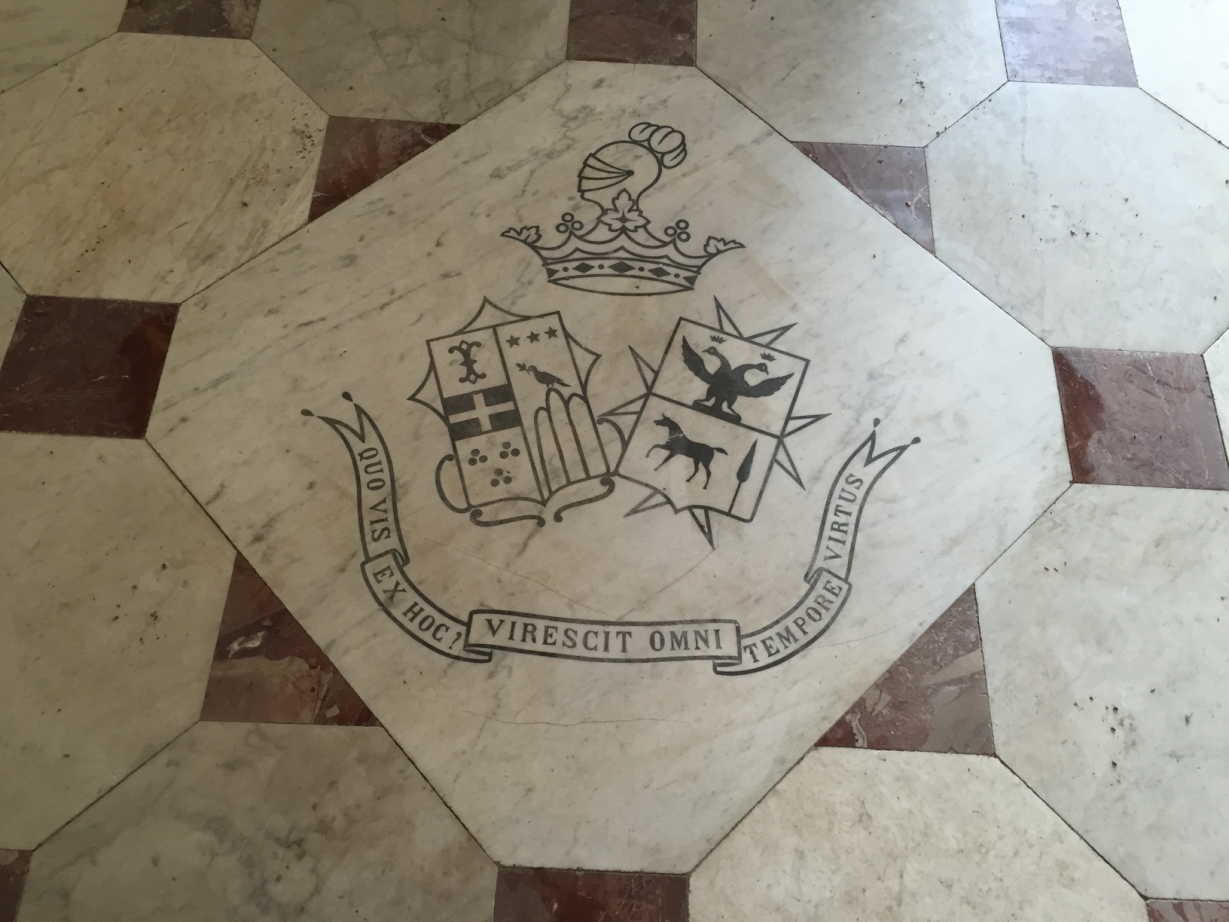
- Floor tile from the home of Giuseppe Salati
- Born: February 22, 1847; Gioi, Salerno, Campania, Kingdom of the Two Sicilies
- Died: July 29, 1930 (aged 83); Gioi, Salerno, Campania, Italy
- Occupation: lawyer
- Known for: author of L'Antica Gioi
- Spouse: Beatrice Romano
- Children: 3

Giuseppe Giulio Salati (February 22, 1847 - July 29, 1930) was an Italian lawyer and author. He was a member of the Order of the Crown of Italy.

== Early life ==
Giuseppe Giuilo Salati was the eldest son of Donato Antonio Salati (1819-1869) of Gioi and Marchessa Giuditta Rachele Cardone (1818-1891) of Prignano Cilento. He had three children with his wife Donna Beatrice Romano (1870-1952). The Giuseppe Salati family lived at 29 Via Giacumbi within the Commune of Gioi in the Italian Province of Salerno.

== Career ==
Giuseppe Salati was a career lawyer within the Commune of Gioi. One notable case resulted in his authorship of a book In 1895 that examined when additional lists can be entered in testimony as evidence in civil matters.

As an author, Salati wrote L'Antica Gioi as a way to capture the rich history of the Commune of Gioi and its people. The book was originally published in 1911 by La Meridionale, and was the first encyclopedia for the history of Gioi. L'Antica Gioi was republished in 2003 by Edizioni Scientifiche Italiane, and contained forwards by Gioi mayors Andrea Salati and Guglielmo Manna.

== See also ==
- Gioi
- Cilento
- Province of Salerno
