= Monte Gelbison =

Mountain in Italy

Gelbison
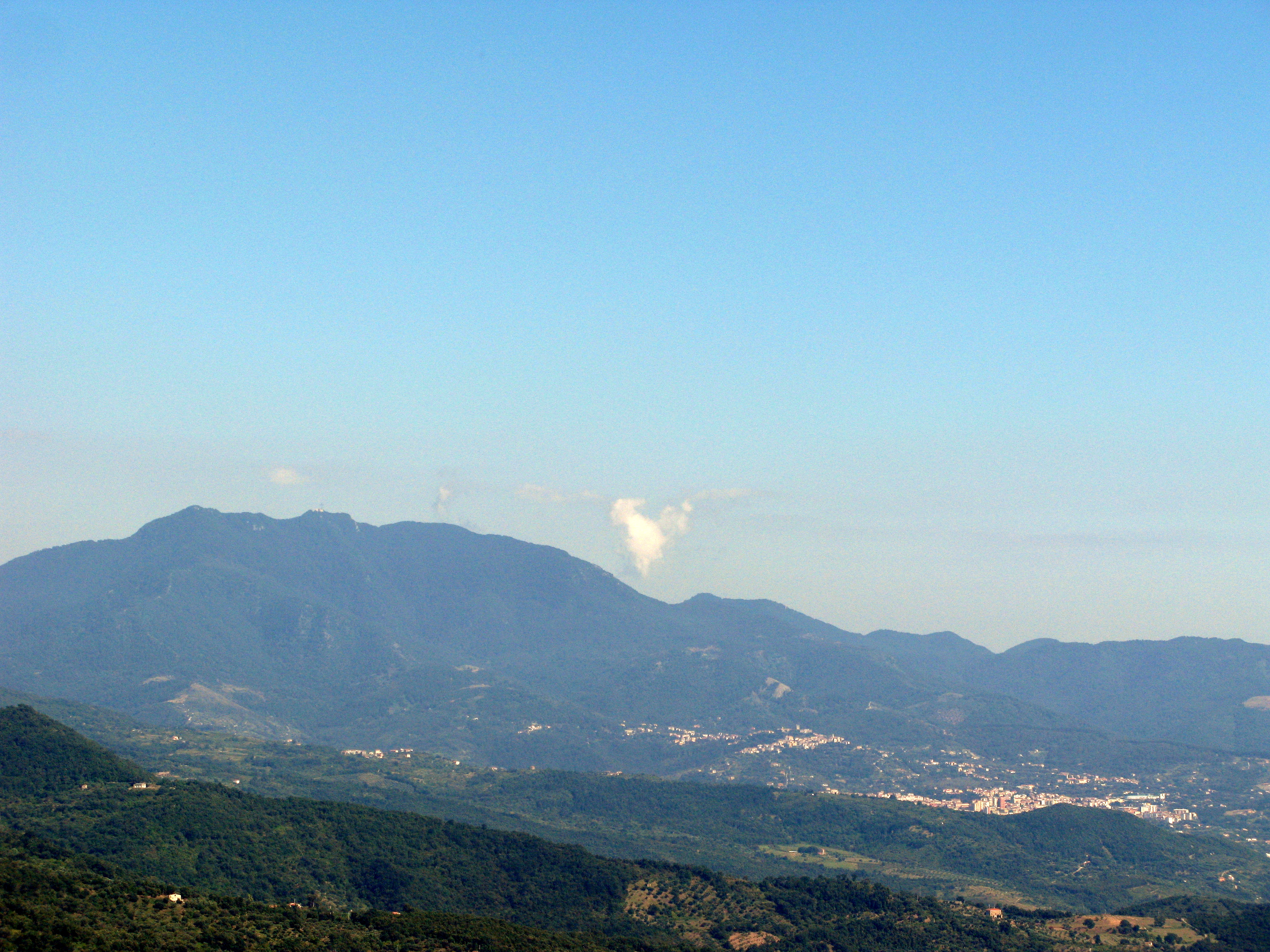
- Monte Gelbison with the towns of Vallo della Lucania and Novi Velia

Highest point
- Elevation: 1,705 m (5,594 ft)
- Coordinates: 40°13′N 15°19′E

Geography
- Location within Italy
- Location: Cilento, Province of Salerno, Campania, Italy.
- Parent range: Lucan Subappennines

Gelbison is a mountain in the Lucan Subappennines range of the Apennine Mountains system, with an elevation of 1,705 metres (5,594 ft). It is located in the southern Cilento region of the Province of Salerno, in the Campania region, of southern Italy.

The mountain is within the Cilento and Vallo di Diano National Park.

== Geography ==
Monte Gelbison is included in the commune of Novi Velia. The western part of the mountain includes several other communes, such as Vallo della Lucania, and ends at the southern Cilentan Coast in the Tyrrhenian Sea.

== History ==
At its top is the sanctuary of Madonna del Monte Sacro, with a tall cross which is illuminated by night. The sanctuary occupies the site an ancient temple of the Oenotrians, dedicated to a deity later identified with Hera.

In local scholarly tradition, it has long been maintained that the site was known to the Saracens: according to this reconstruction, Gelbison derives from gebel-el-son, which in Arabic means 'mountain of the idol.' Recently, a derivation from the German Gelbeisen has been considered more likely, referring to the limonite deposits located on the mountain.

== See also ==
- Monte Bulgheria
- Monte Cervati
- Monte Stella
