= La Cappella Madonna della Grazia =

Church building in Gioi, Salerno, Campania, Italy

Coordinates: 40.2883°N 15.2192°E

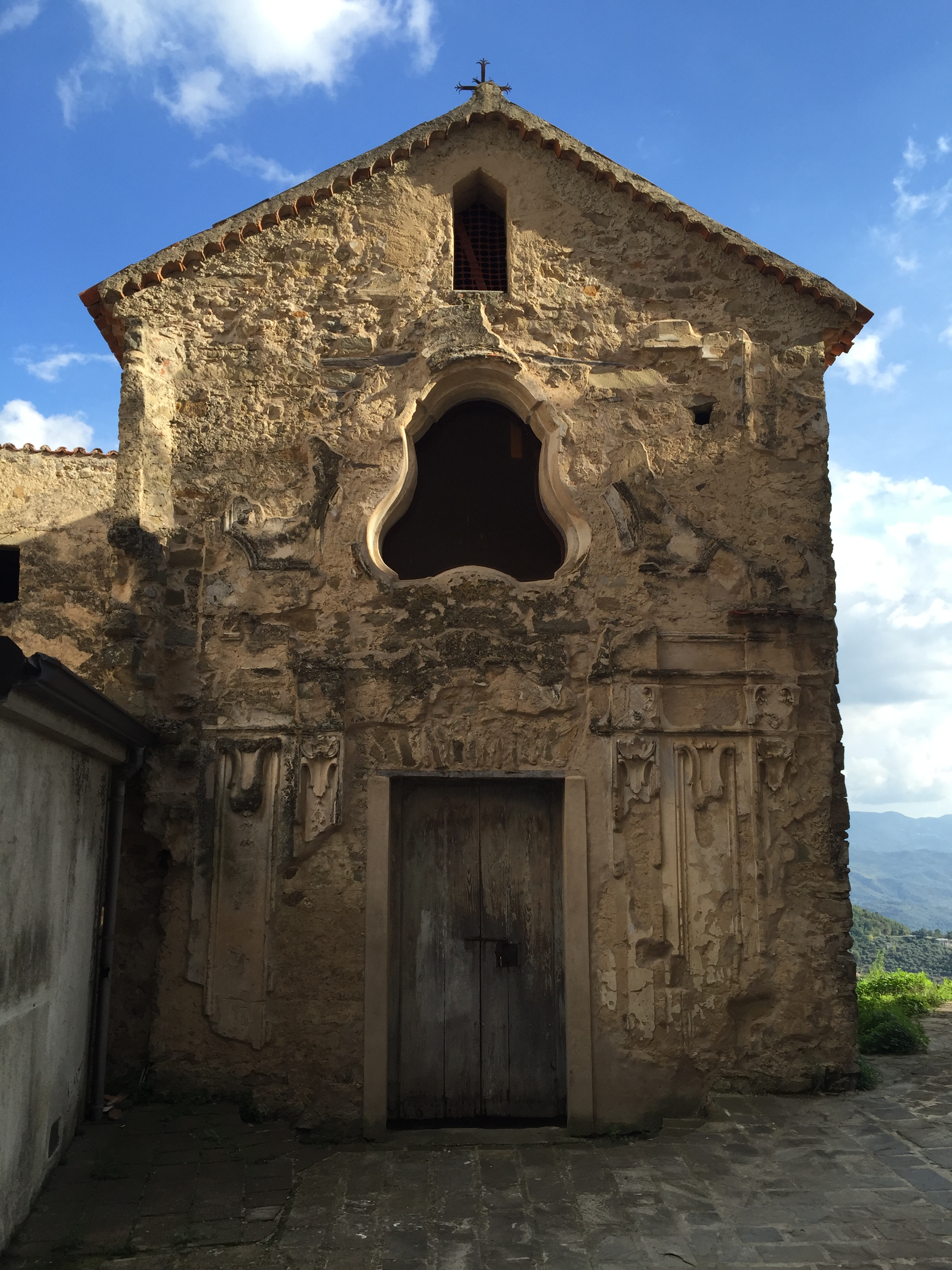
- La Cappella Madonna della Grazia

Religion
- Ecclesiastical or organizational status: not in use

Location
- Location: Gioi, Province of Salerno, Campania, Italy
- Interactive map of La Cappella Madonna della Grazia

Architecture
- Established: c1600

La Cappella Madonna della Grazia is a historic church in Gioi, Italy.

== History ==
La Cappella Madonna della Grazia served as the private family chapel for the Salati family of Gioi, Italy. The chapel was constructed around 1600. During renovations, it was discovered that the original owners were the De Marco family, also from Gioi. The chapel fell into disuse in the 1800s and is now owned by the Italian government. The roof has been restored, but the interior still requires substantial renovation.

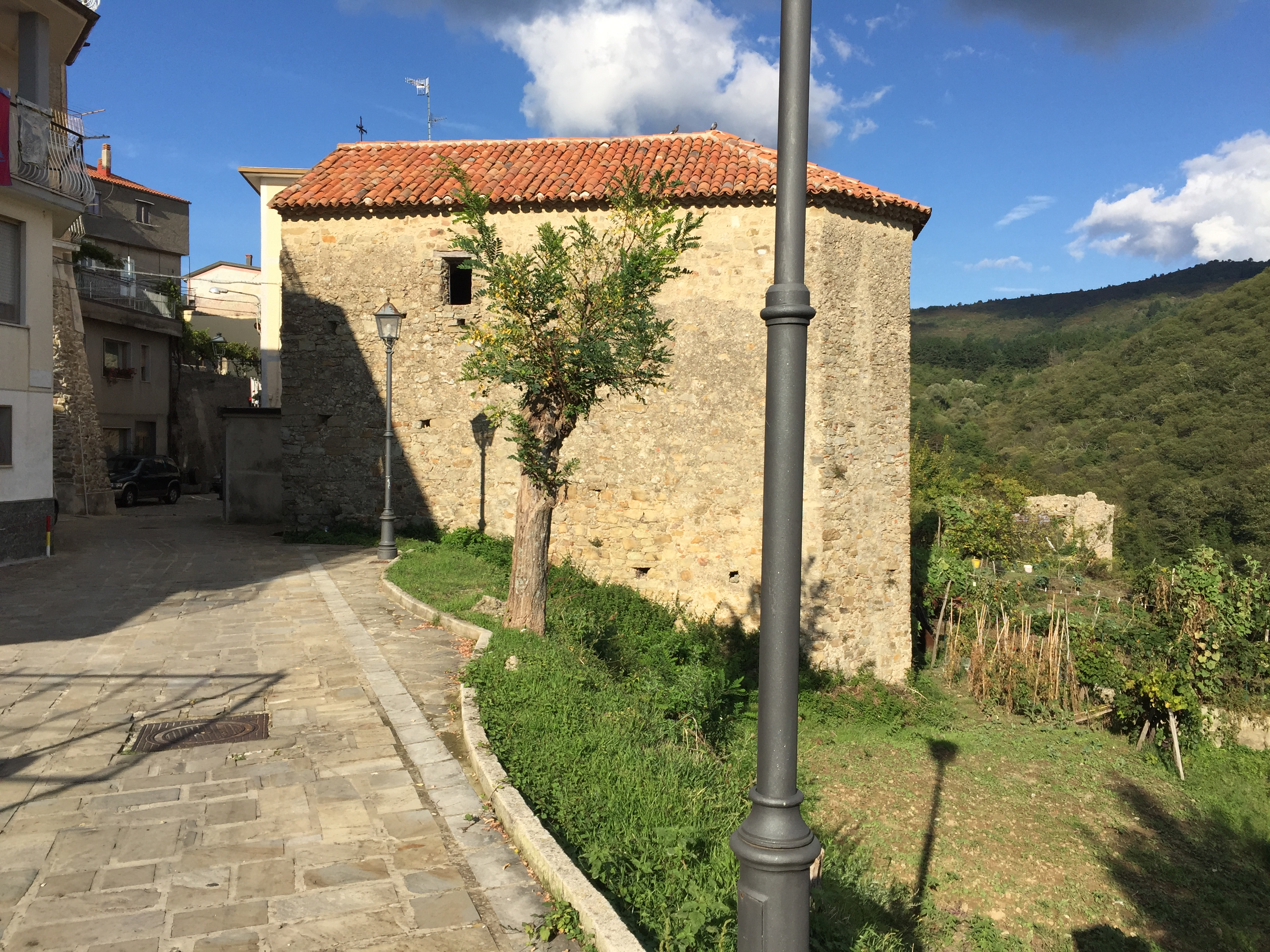
La Cappella Madonna della Grazia (side view)

== See also ==
- Chapel
- Christianity in Italy
- Religion in Italy
