= Gioi =

- Comune
- Comune di Gioi
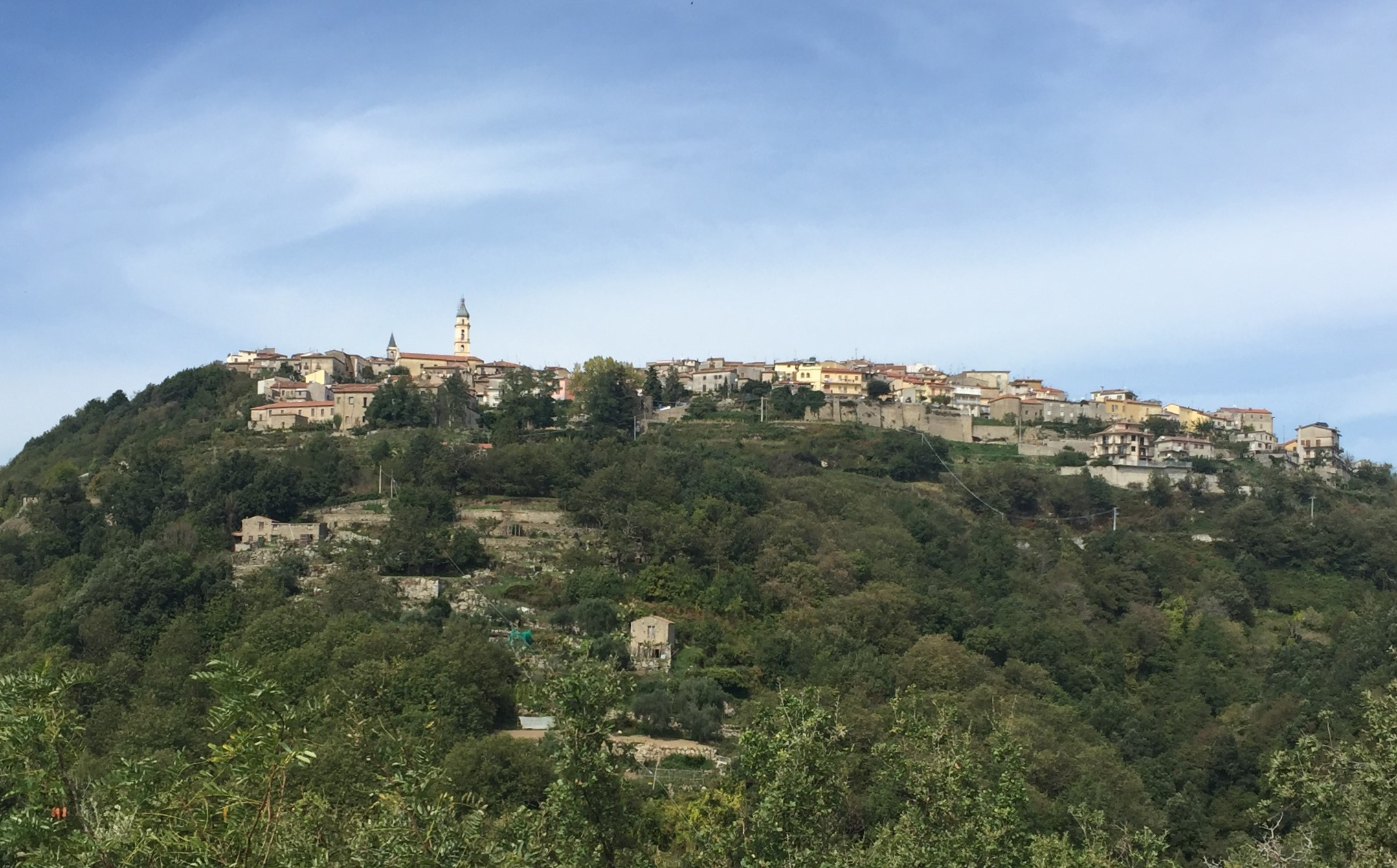
- South view

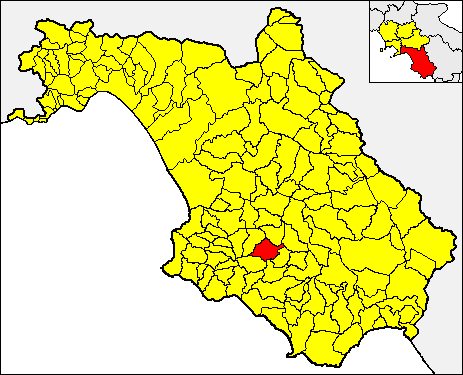
- Gioi within the Province of Salerno

- Location within Italy Location within Campania
- Coordinates: 40°17′21.84″N 15°13′3.07″E
- Country: Italy
- Region: Campania
- Province: Salerno (SA)
- Frazioni: Cardile

Area
  - Total: 28 km^{2} (11 sq mi)
- Elevation: 684 m (2,244 ft)

Population (31 December 2011)
  - Total: 1,339
  - Density: 48/km^{2} (120/sq mi)
- Demonym: Gioiesi
- Time zone: UTC+1 (CET)
  - Summer (DST): UTC+2 (CEST)
- Postal code: 84056
- Dialing code: 0974
- ISTAT code: 065057
- Patron saint: St. Nicholas, Our Lady of the Rosary
- Saint day: 19 August
- Website: Official website

Gioi is a town and comune in the province of Salerno in the Campania region of south-western Italy. As of 2011, its population was 1,339.

Gioi is a member of Cittaslow.

== History ==
The comune of Gioi has a history that dates back well over 1000 years. The first permanent inhabitants may have been monks who settled there around the 11th century. The village was fortified in the 15th century, and parts of the fortifications still exist. The population peaked at about 18,000 in the mid 16th century before being decimated by a plague in 1556. A second plague occurred in 1645, after which the prosperity of the village went into long-term decline.

== Geography ==
Located in the middle of Cilento, Gioi borders with the municipalities of Campora, Moio della Civitella, Orria, Salento, Stio and Vallo della Lucania. It counts a single hamlet (frazione), that is the village of Cardile, 6 km far from it.

== Main sights ==
Churches

- Church of Sant'Eustachio
- Church of San Nicola
- Church of San Francesco
- Chapel of Madonna della Porta
- Chapel of Madonna dello Schito
- Chapel of Madonna della Grazie

Palaces

- Palace Conti
- Palace Ferri
- Palace Reielli
- Palace Salati

== Notable people ==
- Leo de Berardinis (1940-2008), stage actor and theatre director
- Armando Salati (1884-1963), Vice Consul to the United States
- Giuseppe Salati (1847-1930), author of L'Antica Gioi

== Genealogy project ==
The Genetic Park of Cilento and Vallo di Diano Project was established in 2000, and focuses on the populations of Campora, Gioi, and Cardile. Using village and church records, a pedigree of over 5000 individuals was created that spans 350 years.

== See also ==
- La Cappella Madonna della Grazia
- Cilentan dialect
- Cilento and Vallo di Diano National Park
