= Cuccaro Vetere =

- Comune
- Comune di Cuccaro Vetere
- Location within Italy Location within Campania
- Coordinates: 40°10′N 15°19′E
- Country: Italy
- Region: Campania
- Province: Salerno (SA)
- Frazioni: Ceraso, Futani, Novi Velia

Area
  - Total: 17 km^{2} (6.6 sq mi)
- Elevation: 629 m (2,064 ft)

Population (1 April 2009)
  - Total: 584
  - Density: 34/km^{2} (89/sq mi)
- Demonym: Cuccaresi
- Time zone: UTC+1 (CET)
  - Summer (DST): UTC+2 (CEST)
- Postal code: 84050
- Dialing code: 0974
- ISTAT code: 065049
- Patron saint: San Pietro
- Website: Official website

Cuccaro Vetere (Cilentan: Cuccare) is a town and comune in the province of Salerno in the Campania region of south-western Italy.
