= Armando Salati =

Italian consul

- Born: June 20, 1884; Gioi, Salerno, Campania, Italy
- Died: January 4, 1963 (aged 78); Gioi, Salerno, Campania, Italy
- Occupation: Italian Vice Consul to the United States

Armando Salati (1884–1963) was an Italian Vice Consul to the United States, and Philadelphia Honorary Consul from 1913–1940.

== Family ==
Salati was born June 20, 1884, as the eldest son of Ottavio and Adelaide Salati of the Comune di Gioi, Campania, Italy. Armando married Julia LaFazia in Philadelphia, Pennsylvania on February 2, 1914; they had eight children, one of whom died as an infant.

== Career ==
After graduating from law school in Italy, Armando Salati became a Lieutenant in the Italian Army. In 1912, he was offered an opportunity from the King of Italy to join the Italian Consulate in the United States. As Italian Vice Consul, he became Philadelphia Honorary Consul, serving from 1913 to 1940. Armando Salati became acting Consul in 1938, following the recall to Italy of Philadelphia Consul Edoardo Pervan, who had been accused by the House Un-American Activities Committee of being a Fascist propagandist. Salati held this post until Ludovico Censi was named Philadelphia Consul in 1939. The consulate was located at 2128 Locust Street in Philadelphia. In 1942 with the entry of the United States into World War II, the U.S. Government froze Italian assets, forbade Italians from leaving the country, and closed the consulates. The Philadelphia Consulate did not reopen until 1947, representing the Italian Republic which had replaced the Kingdom of Italy in 1946. In retirement, Salati returned to his home in Gioi, Campania, Italy in 1951. He died at his ancestral home on January 4, 1963.

== Inventor ==
Armando Salati was granted United States patent #1,246,791 on November 13, 1917, as a subject of the King of Italy.

== Recognition ==
Armando Salati was awarded Cavaliere of the Italian Crown by Victor Emmanuel III of Italy in 1921.

== See also ==
- Gioi
- Order of the Crown of Italy
- List of Italian orders of knighthood
- Victor Emmanuel III of Italy
- Kingdom of Italy
- Italian Republic
