= Valle dell'Angelo =

- Comune
- Comune di Valle dell'Angelo
- Coat of arms

- Location within Italy Location within Campania
- Coordinates: 40°21′N 15°22′E
- Country: Italy
- Region: Campania
- Province: Salerno (SA)
- Frazioni: Pruno

Government
  - Mayor: Salvatore Angelo Iannuzzi (since June 2008)

Area
  - Total: 36.60 km^{2} (14.13 sq mi)
- Elevation: 620 m (2,030 ft)

Population (2026)
  - Total: 217
  - Density: 5.93/km^{2} (15.4/sq mi)
- Demonym: Casalettari / Vallangiolesi
- Time zone: UTC+1 (CET)
  - Summer (DST): UTC+2 (CEST)
- Postal code: 84070
- Dialing code: 0974
- Patron saint: St. Bartolo
- Saint day: July 31
- Website: Official website

Valle dell'Angelo is a village and comune (municipality) in the Province of Salerno in the region of Campania in southern Italy. With a population of 217, it is the least populous municipality in Campania.

The name translates as "Valley of the Angel" and the comune contains La Grotta dell'Angelo (the Cave of the Angel). The cave safeguards the statue of the Archangel Michael, shown in defensive posture.

== Demographics ==
As of 2026, the population is 217, of which 51.6% are male, and 48.4% are female. Minors make up 4.1% of the population, and seniors make up 35.5%.

Historical population

Year	Pop.	±%
1861	1,392	—
1871	1,579	+13.4%
1881	1,644	+4.1%
1901	1,152	−29.9%
1911	1,083	−6.0%
1921	918	−15.2%
1931	759	−17.3%
1936	823	+8.4%

Year	Pop.	±%
1951	797	−3.2%
1961	773	−3.0%
1971	661	−14.5%
1981	623	−5.7%
1991	545	−12.5%
2001	406	−25.5%
2011	280	−31.0%
2021	220	−21.4%

Source: ISTAT

=== Immigration ===
As of 2025, immigrants make up 3.9% of the total population. The foreign countries of birth are Germany, Poland, and the United States.

== See also ==
- Pruno Cilento
- Cilento
