= Piaggine =

- Comune
- Comune di Piaggine
- Location within Italy Location within Campania
- Coordinates: 40°21′N 15°23′E
- Country: Italy
- Region: Campania
- Province: Salerno (SA)
- Frazioni: Pruno

Government
  - Mayor: Renato Pizzolante (since June 2022)

Area
  - Total: 62 km^{2} (24 sq mi)
- Elevation: 630 m (2,070 ft)

Population (1 January 2020)
  - Total: 1,231
  - Density: 20/km^{2} (51/sq mi)
- Demonym: Piagginesi / Chiainari
- Time zone: UTC+1 (CET)
  - Summer (DST): UTC+2 (CEST)
- Postal code: 84065
- Dialing code: 0974
- ISTAT code: 065095
- Website: Official website

Piaggine, also called “Chiaine“ in the local dialect, is a town and comune in the province of Salerno, in the region of Campania, in the south-west of Italy.

The town is located on the river Calore, 93 miles (150 km) south-east of Naples, 57 miles (92 km) north-west of Potenza.

According to the official data, the resident population in 2020 was 1231.

Piaggine was originally inhabited around 1000 A.D by a community of nomadic shepherds, which found green pastures among the mountains near the river.

The town is famous for being the birthplace of the notorious brigant Giuseppe Tardio.

== Twin towns ==
- Sayalonga (Spain)

== See also ==
- Pruno Cilento
- Cilento
