= Vallo della Lucania =

- Comune
- Comune di Vallo della Lucania
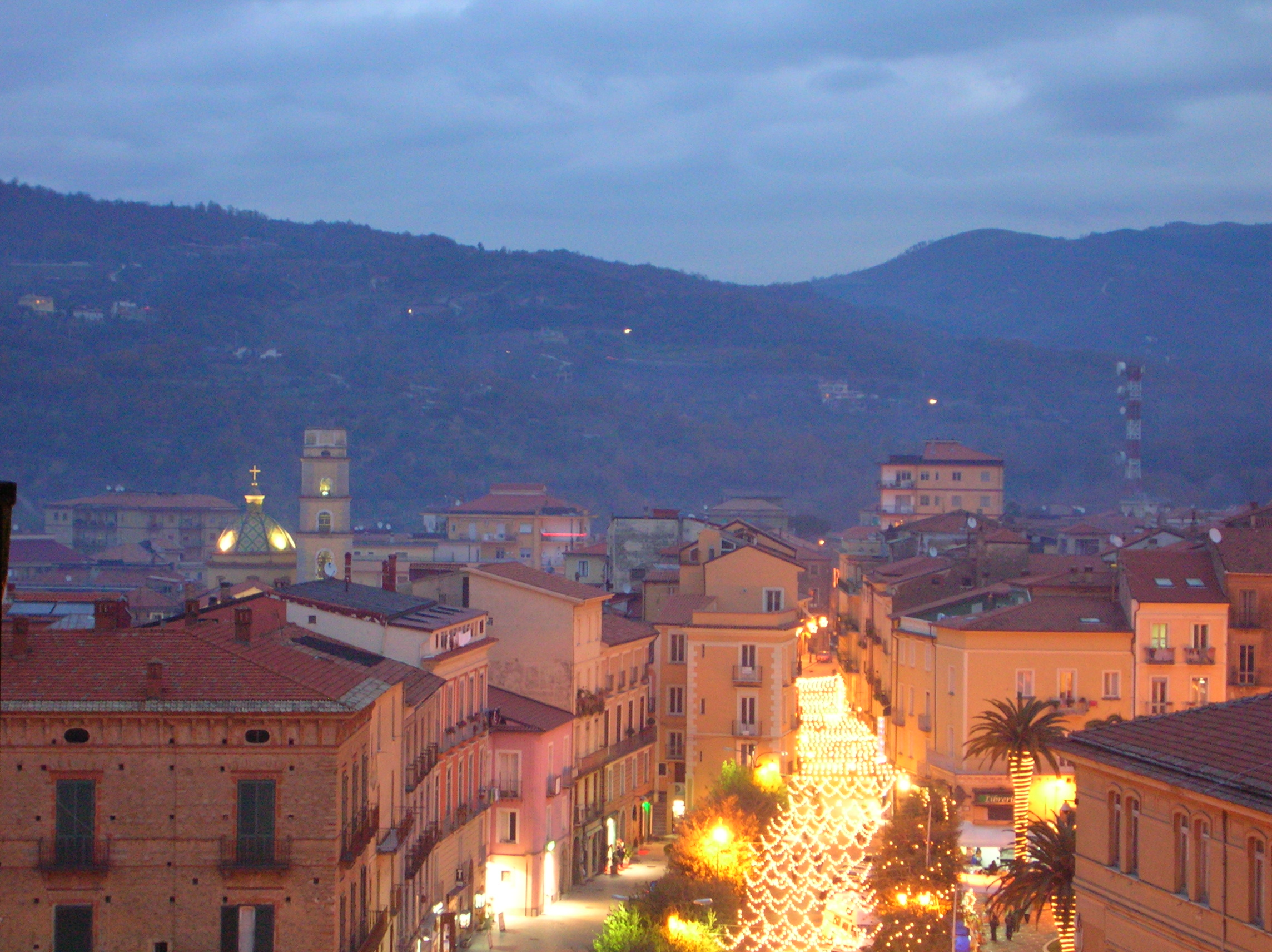
- Panoramic view of Vallo

- Coat of arms

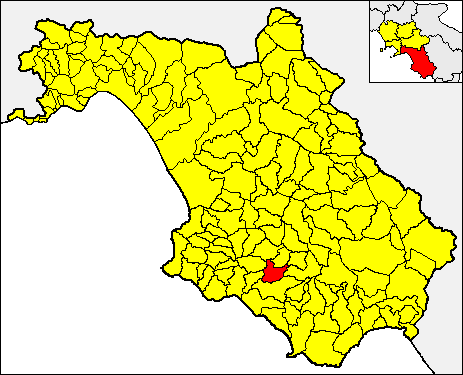
- Vallo within the Province of Salerno

- Location within Italy Location within Campania
- Coordinates: 40°14′N 15°16′E
- Country: Italy
- Region: Campania
- Province: Salerno (SA)
- Frazioni: Angellara, Massa, Pattano

Government
  - Mayor: Antonio Sansone (Lista Civica)

Area
  - Total: 25 km^{2} (9.7 sq mi)
- Elevation: 380 m (1,250 ft)

Population (31 December 2011)
  - Total: 8,680
  - Density: 350/km^{2} (900/sq mi)
- Demonym: Vallesi
- Time zone: UTC+1 (CET)
  - Summer (DST): UTC+2 (CEST)
- Postal code: 84078, 84040, 84050, 84060
- Dialing code: 0974
- Patron saint: St. Pantaleone
- Saint day: July 27
- Website: Official website

Vallo della Lucania (commonly known simply as Vallo) is a town and comune in the province of Salerno in the Campania region of south-western Italy. It lies in the middle of Cilento and its population is 8,680.

== History ==
A settlement called Castrum Cornutum (meaning: "Fortress of Cornutans") is documented in the 13th century: according to the Italian historian Giuseppe Maiese, it had been founded by colonists from Cornutum, an ancient city in Dalmatia. In the 18th century the town changed its name to Vallo di Novi. In 1806, during the French government of the Kingdom of Naples, it was made a district capital.

== Geography ==
The town is located in the middle of the Cilento and its National Park, close to Gelbison mountain.

The municipality borders with Cannalonga, Castelnuovo Cilento, Ceraso, Gioi, Moio della Civitella, Novi Velia, and Salento. The hamlets (frazioni) are Angellara, Massa, and Pattano.

== Gallery ==
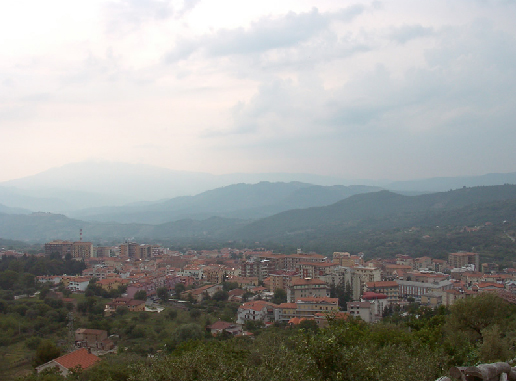
Town's view

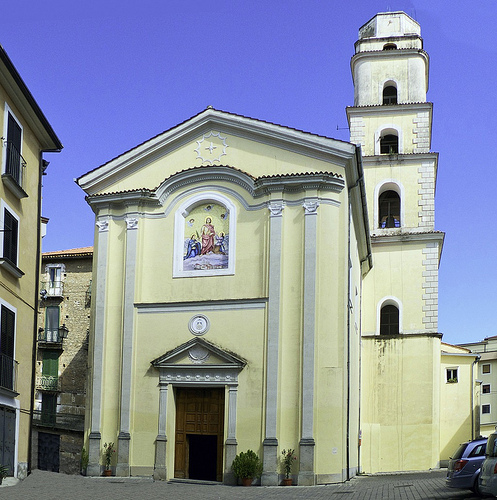
San Pantaleone church

== See also ==
- Cilento
- Gelbison (mountain)
- Gelbison Cilento (football club)
- Roman Catholic Diocese of Vallo della Lucania
