= Novi Velia =

- Comune
- Comune di Novi Velia
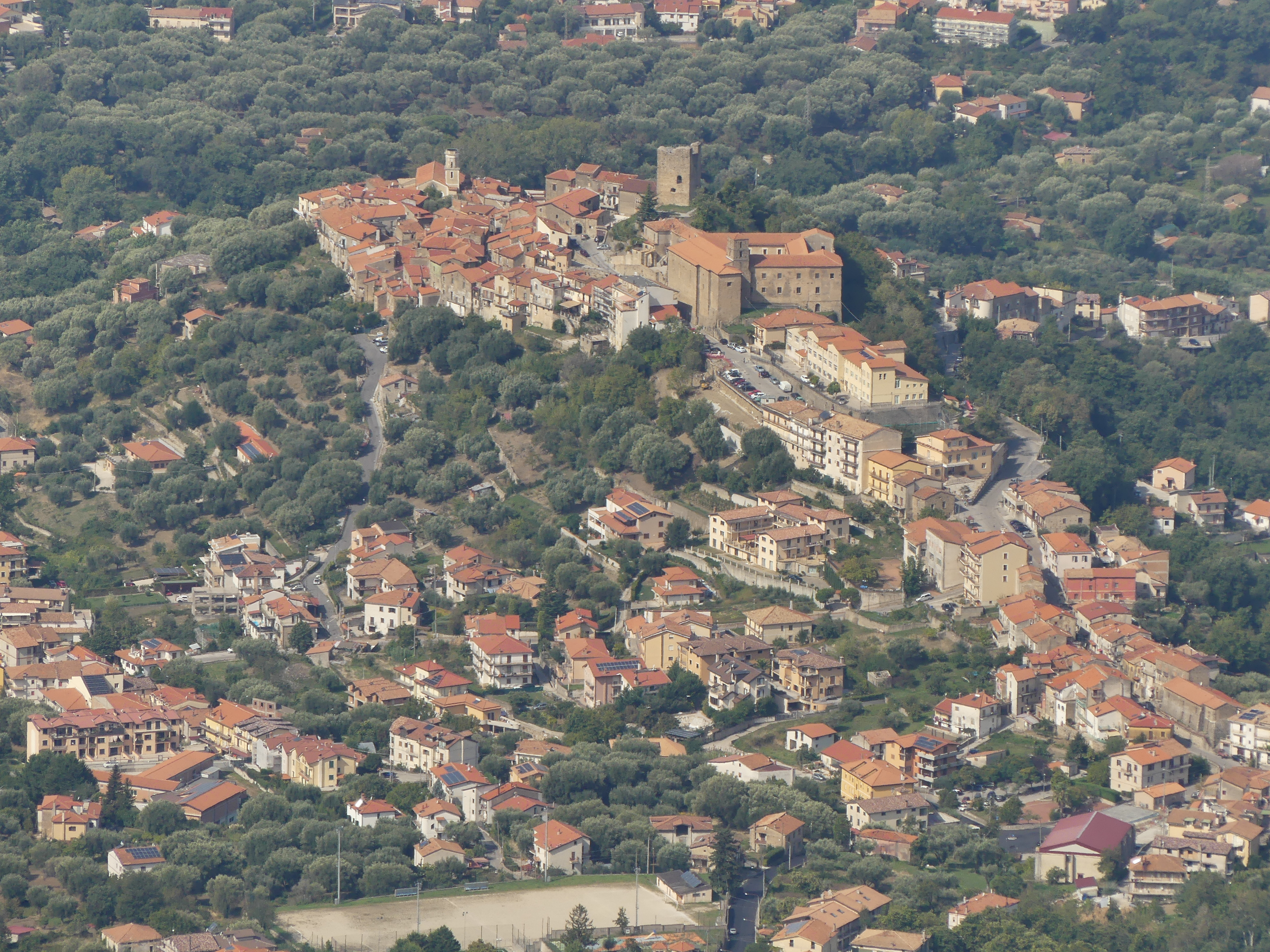
- The town of Novi Velia

- Coat of arms

- Location within Italy Location within Campania
- Coordinates: 40°13′N 15°17′E
- Country: Italy
- Region: Campania
- Province: Salerno (SA)

Government
  - Mayor: Adriano De Vita

Area
  - Total: 34.71 km^{2} (13.40 sq mi)
- Elevation: 648 m (2,126 ft)

Population (30 November 2017)
  - Total: 2,300
  - Density: 66/km^{2} (170/sq mi)
- Demonym: Novesi
- Time zone: UTC+1 (CET)
  - Summer (DST): UTC+2 (CEST)
- Postal code: 84060
- Dialing code: 0974
- Patron saint: St. Nicholas
- Saint day: 6 December
- Website: Official website

Novi Velia is a town and comune of the Province of Salerno, Campania, southern Italy. It is located in the southern Cilento area.

The town takes its name from the ancient Greek town of Velia, whose archaeological remains are located nearby.

Novi Velia is located in the Cilento and Vallo di Diano National Park, and the comune contains Monte Gelbison.

== See also ==
- Pruno Cilento — largest forest in the Cilento.
- Cilentan Coast
