= Verona Arena =

Ancient Roman amphitheater in Verona, Italy

Coordinates: 45°26′20″N 10°59′40″E

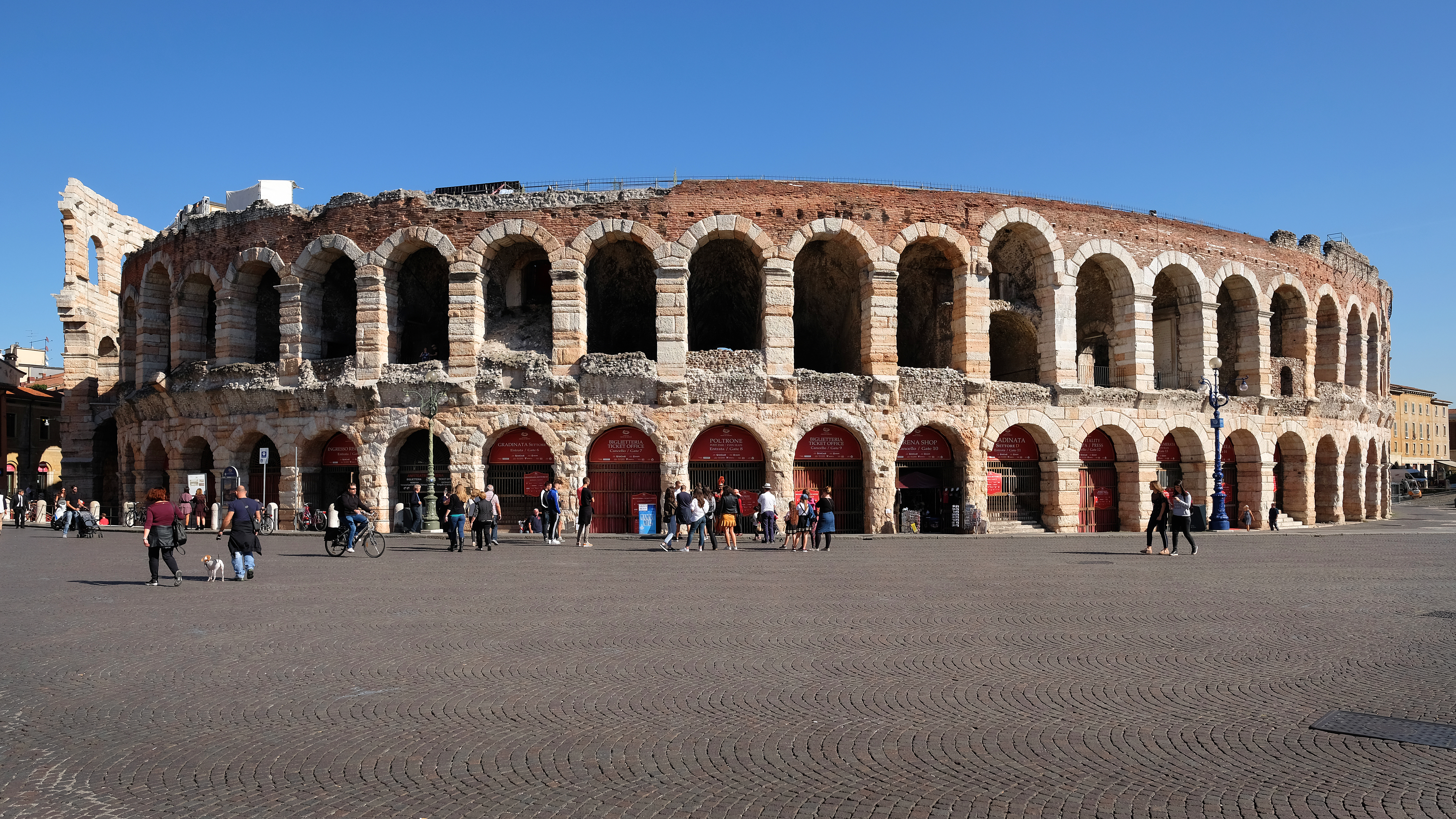
- The Arena seen from Piazza Bra.

General information
- Type: Amphitheatre
- Location: Verona, Italy
- Completed: AD 30; 1996 years ago

Other information
- Seating capacity: 22,000

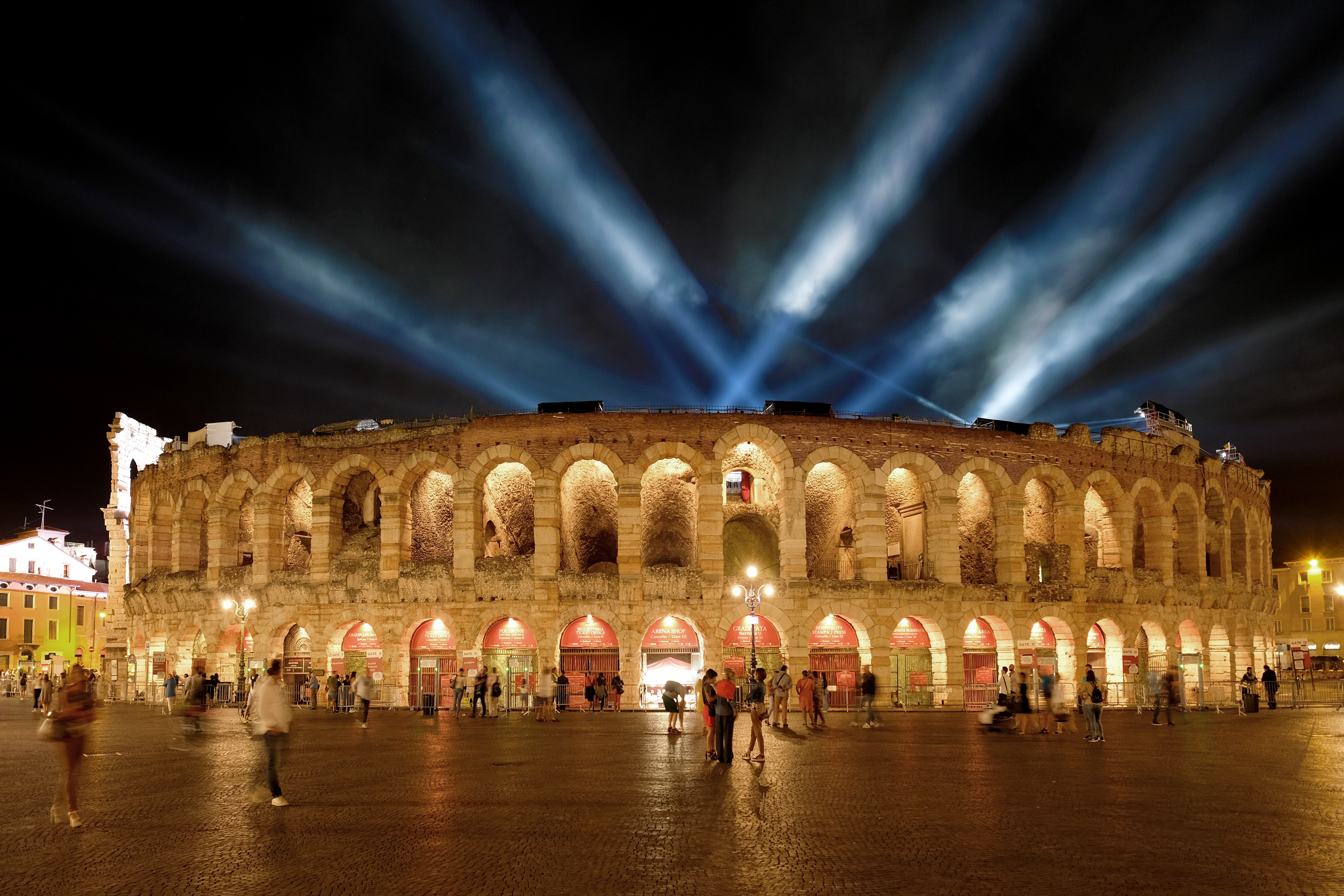
Verona Arena at night in 2018

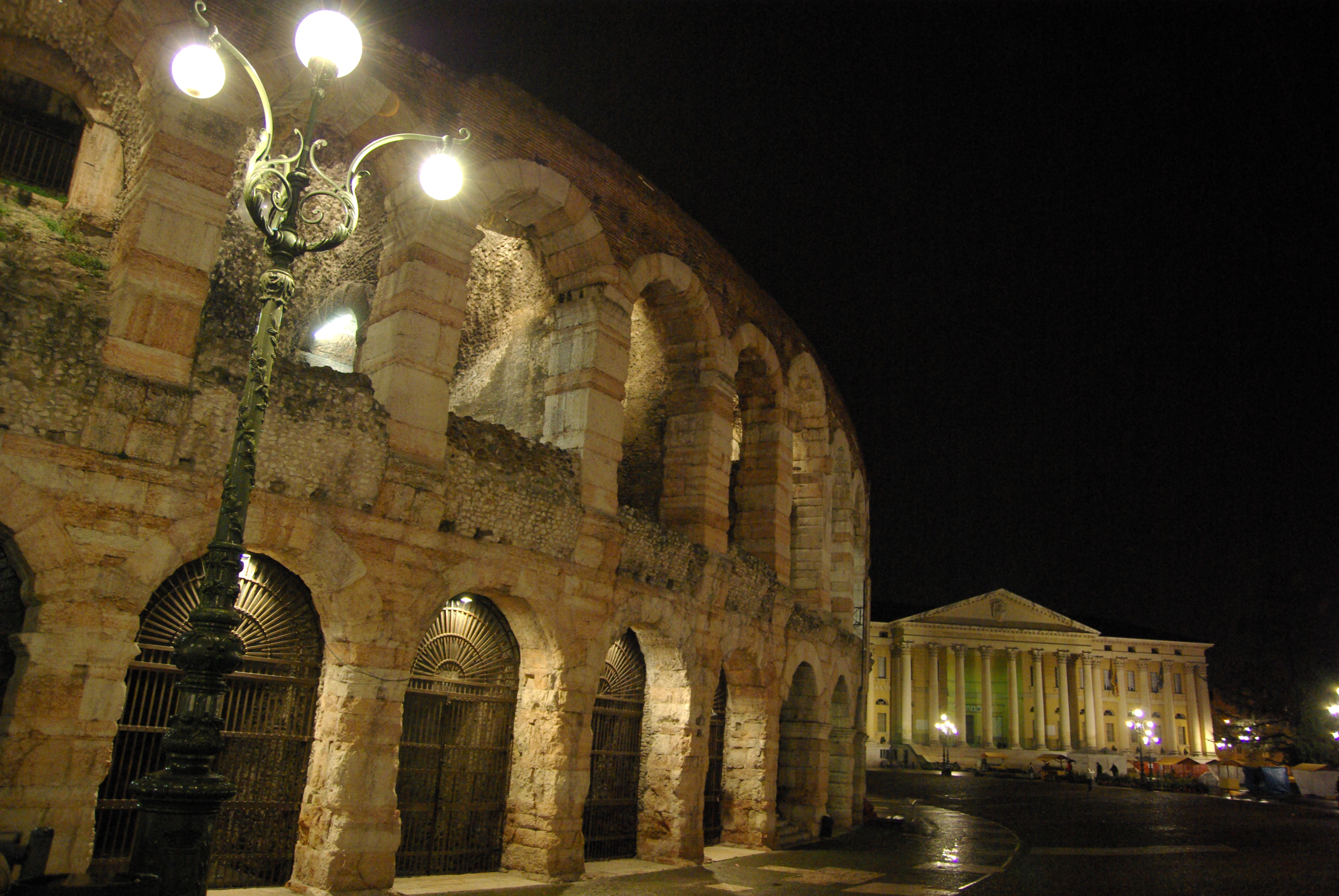
Arena in Piazza Bra with Municipio at night

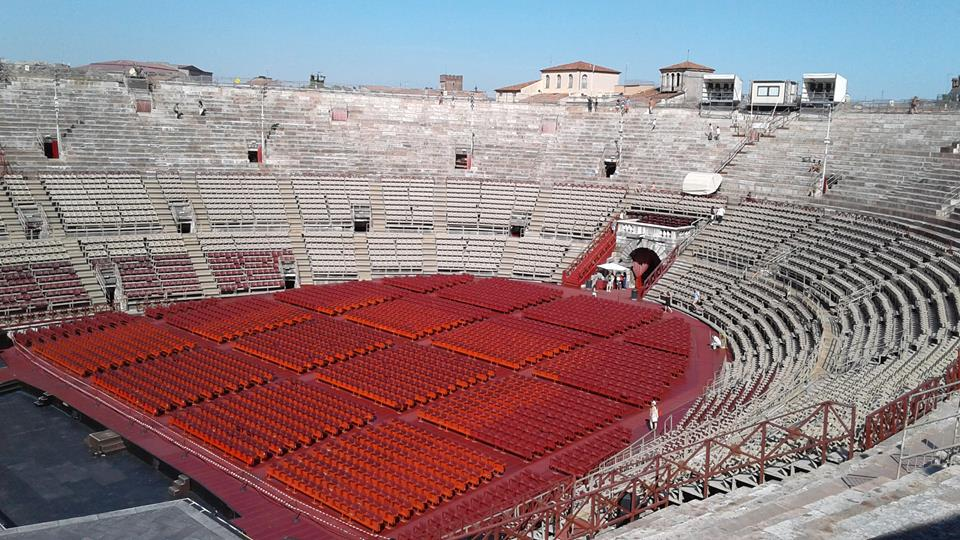
Inside Verona Arena

The Verona Arena is a Roman amphitheatre located in the historic center of Verona, Italy. It is among the best-preserved ancient amphitheatres to have survived into the modern era. This remarkable state of preservation is largely due to systematic restoration efforts that began in the 16th century.

During the summer months, the Arena hosts the Arena di Verona Festival, with opera seasons that have run uninterrupted except by wars since 1913. (Note: Excluding the years of the First and Second World Wars.) Throughout the rest of the year, it serves as a concert venue.

The arena hosted the closing ceremony for the 2026 Winter Olympics and the opening ceremony for the 2026 Winter Paralympics.

== History ==
=== Controversies surrounding the construction date ===
In the absence of written sources regarding the amphitheatre's construction, historical proposals for when it was built range from the 1st to the 3rd century. Historian Pirro Marconi suggested a date between the second and third decades of the 1st century—spanning the late Augustan and early Tiberian periods—while more recently, Luigi Beschi leaned toward the mid-1st century.

To more accurately date the Arena, scholars have compared it to the amphitheatre of Pula, which shares similarities with Verona's in both stylistic and technical aspects. Both belong to a common geographical and cultural region, and some historians have hypothesized that they may have been designed by the same architect and constructed by the same workforce. The Pula amphitheatre is generally dated to the Augustan period, suggesting that the Arena of Verona may have been built around this time.

Additional clues aiding in the dating process include the amphitheatre's decorations, particularly a tuff sculpture depicting a life-sized gladiator's head encased in a helmet. This helmet features two round openings revealing the fighter's eyes, with a visor composed of two sections meeting precisely at the face's midline. The cheek guards, starting narrow at the ears, widen to cover the entire face except the eyes and appear to be fastened by two crossed straps beneath the chin.

This helmet style emerged at the end of the Augustan era, around 10–20 AD. This narrows the construction window to the late reign of Augustus and the early reign of Claudius. Given that statues were typically crafted at the end of a building's construction, Pirro Marconi inferred that the Arena was completed by approximately 30 AD.

The amphitheatre were part of the monumentalization projects in Verona during the Julio-Claudian era, which also included the Forum of Verona and the embellishment of the city's gateways. Both the Verona and Pula amphitheatres predate the construction of the Colosseum, representing new developments in the evolution of this architectural form.

=== Ancient history ===
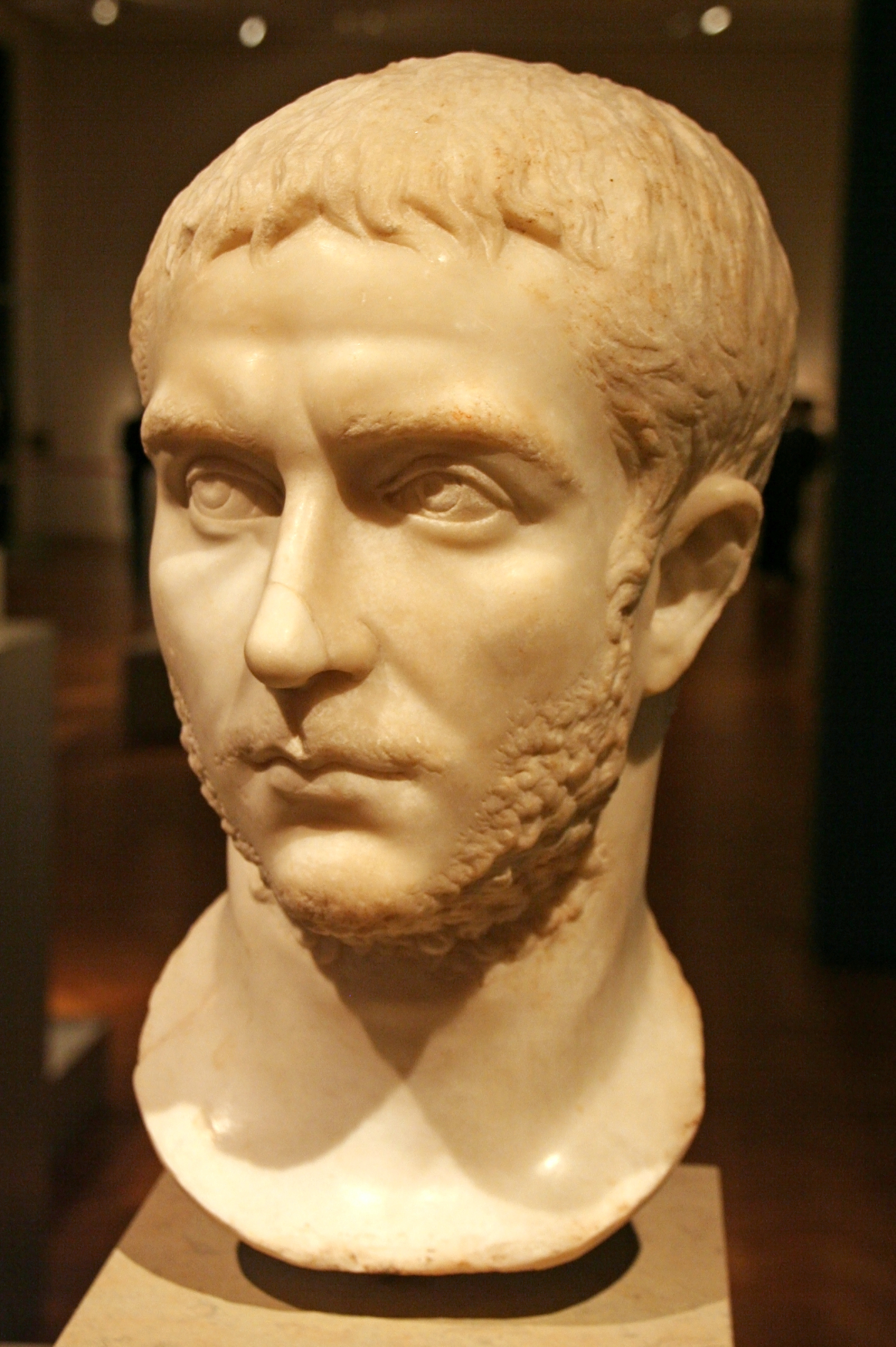
A bust of Emperor Gallienus, who incorporated the Verona amphitheatre into the new city walls.

Much of the amphitheatre’s history in antiquity remains obscure. The city played a role in the war between Vitellius and Vespasian in 69 AD. with the latter selecting Verona as a stronghold due to its surrounding open fields, ideal for deploying cavalry. However, the city walls had become inadequate, partly because the amphitheatre stood just outside them. To address this, Vespasian ordered the construction of a rampart and the excavation of the Adigetto, a long moat south of the city center that remained in use into the Middle Ages. This project confirms that by 69 AD, the amphitheatre was already built.

Emperor Gallienus faced prolonged conflicts to repel the 3rd-century barbarian invasions, employing Verona in his innovative elastic defense strategy, which relied on key cities such as Mediolanum, Verona, and Aquileia. In 265, he refurbished Verona’s late Republican walls and construct a new 550-meter section of curtain wall to encompass the Arena, resolving the issue of its dominant position outside the earlier Republican defenses.

In 1874, Antonio Pompei conducted excavations around the Arena, uncovering the foundations of the Gallienus walls, which ran 5 meters from the amphitheatre. It was discovered that these walls intersected the rainwater drainage channels, though the Arena remained usable for spectacles thanks to an alternative solution: a large central well, identified in the 18th century. However, the drainage system became less efficient, marking the beginning of the amphitheatre’s decline.

Though unconfirmed, it is possible that the amphitheatre was used for the martyrdom of Christians. The Marquis Scipione Maffei speculated that Firmus and Rusticus were martyred here in 304, on the same occasion that Bishop Proculus asked to be martyred, but was instead mocked and sent away because he was old.

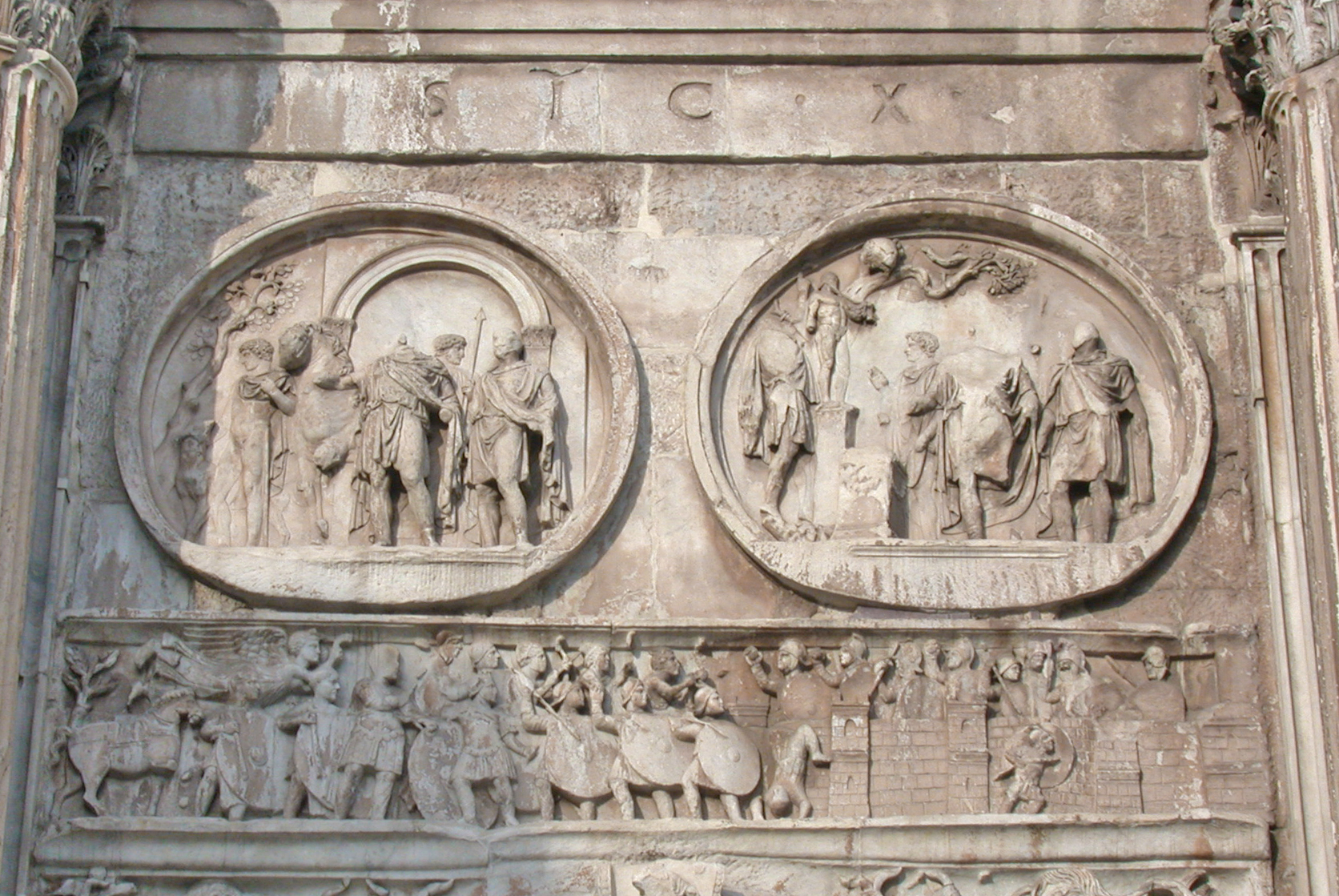
A depiction of the Siege of Verona by Constantine I’s troops, from the Constantinian frieze on the south side of the Arch of Constantine in Rome. The relief on the right shows the walls enclosing the Arena, though the Arena itself is not visible.

In 312, Verona played role in the war between Constantine and Maxentius, when the latter barricaded himself in the city, and Constantine’s forces laid siege. The assault focused on the amphitheatre, which served as a bastion for the defenders due to its height surpassing the Gallienus walls. Two critical clashes of that campaign occurred in front of the Arena: the sortie by the besieged, enabling Ruricius Pompeianus to seek reinforcements, and the nocturnal battle, where Constantine faced attacks from both the defenders and arriving reinforcements yet emerged victorious.

This battle is documented in a panegyric to Constantine and depicted in a relief on the Arch of Constantine, showing Verona under siege. In the square relief, Constantine is depicted on the left, shielded by a guard and crowned by Victory, while on the right, his army assaults the city as the defenders hurl arrows and javelins from the walls and towers. The rightmost section of the wall, lacking lower-level windows, likely represents the portion enclosing the Arena.

The rise of Christianity and the subsequent end of gladiatorial games, coupled with the inefficiency of public institutions in maintaining the monument, were factors in its abandonment.

==== The games ====
Few documents detail the spectacles held in the Verona amphitheatre, with the only surviving literary record being a letter from Pliny the Younger:

Gaius Plinius to his friend Maximus.
You did well to promise our Veronese a gladiatorial show, for they have long loved, respected, and honored you. It was also from this city that your most beloved and virtuous wife hailed. It was fitting to dedicate some public work or spectacle to her memory—and what better than a spectacle, the most appropriate tribute for a funeral? Moreover, the request was so insistent that denying it would have seemed not steadfastness but harshness. I commend you further for your generosity and willingness in granting it; such acts also demonstrate magnanimity. I wish the African panthers you had purchased in great numbers had arrived on time, but though delayed by bad weather, you still earned gratitude, as their absence was no fault of yours. Farewell.
C. PLINIUS MAXIMO SUO S.
Recte fecisti quod gladiatorium munus Veronensibus nostris promisisti, a quibus olim amaris suspiceris ornaris. Inde etiam uxorem carissimam tibi et probatissimam habuisti, cuius memoriae aut opus aliquod aut spectaculum atque hoc potissimum, quod maxime funeri, debebatur. Praeterea tanto consensu rogabaris, ut negare non constans, sed durum videretur. Illud quoque egregie, quod tam facilis tam liberalis in edendo fuisti; nam per haec etiam magnus animus ostenditur. Vellem Africanae, quas coemeras plurimas, ad praefinitum diem occurrissent: sed licet cessaverint illae tempestate detentae, tu tamen meruisti ut acceptum tibi fieret, quod quo minus exhiberes, non per te stetit. Vale.

— Gaius Plinius Caecilius Secundus, Epistularum, Book VI, 34

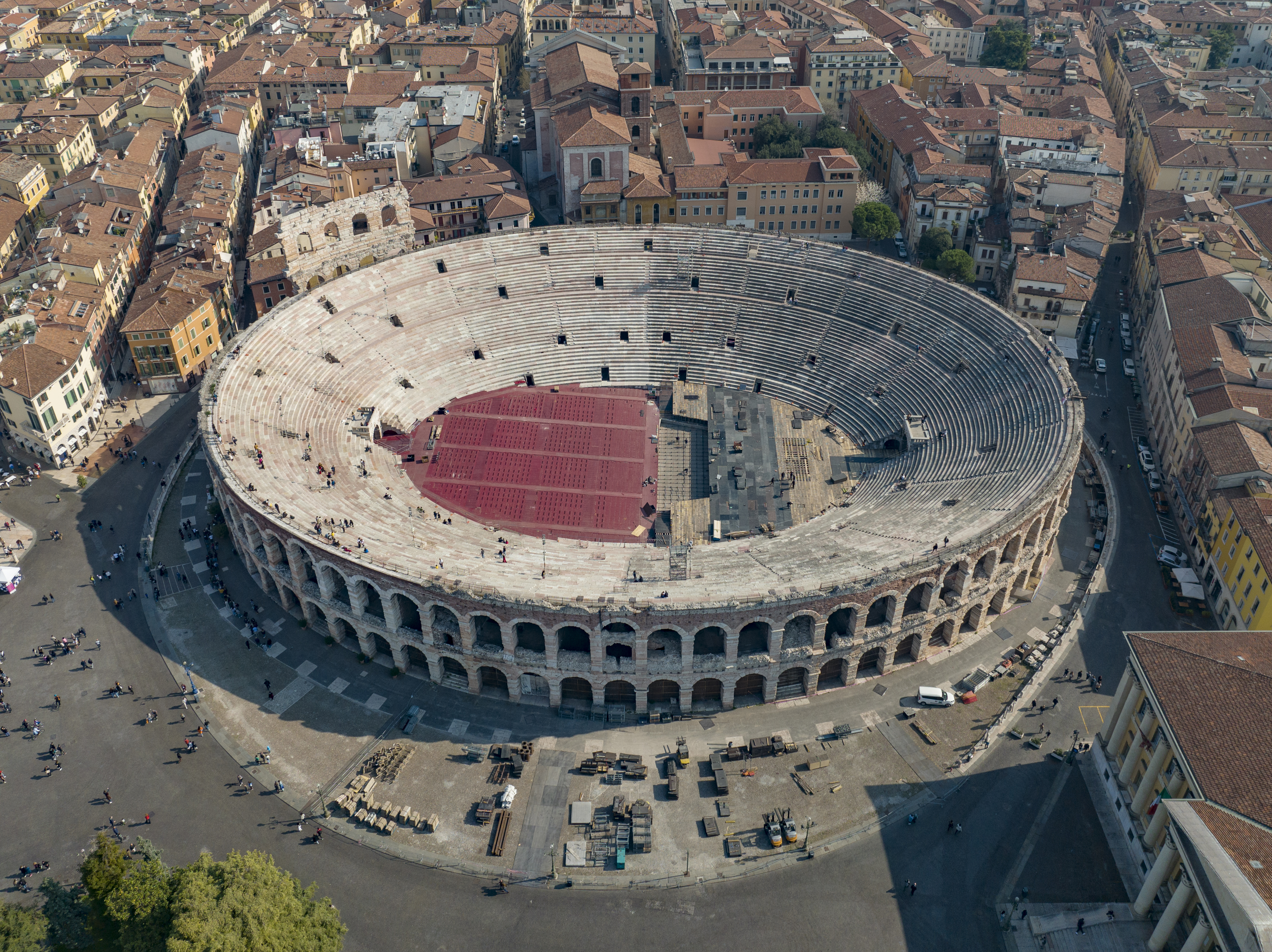
An aerial view of the Arena.

From this letter, it can be inferred that Pliny’s friend offered Verona a hunting spectacle, a venatio, as a funeral tribute to his wife. Pliny deems this choice particularly fitting, noting that such spectacles originated as funerary games of Etruscan or Campanian origin.

Several funerary inscriptions of gladiators who died fighting in the Arena have also been discovered in Verona. The least informative is a damaged slab bearing the phrase [famil]ia gladiatoria; a second mentions the secutor Aedonius, who fought eight times in Verona before being defeated and killed at the young age of twenty-six; another pertains to a retiarius named Generosus, from the gladiatorial school of Alexandria, who fought twenty-seven times without defeat and died of natural causes; yet another belongs to Pardon, a Dertonensis, who perished in his eleventh bout.

The most intriguing inscription belongs to a certain Glaucus: (Note: The inscription can be translated as: “To the divine spirits of Glaucus, originally from Modena. He fought seven times and died in the eighth. He lived twenty-three years and five days. Aurelia dedicated this tomb to her dear husband, along with his fans. I advise each of you to consult your own horoscope and not trust Nemesis: I trusted her, and I was deceived, as you see. Farewell, be well.”) From this, it appears that Glaucus made a vow to Nemesis, a deity revered by gladiators, for his safety, but to no avail. He warns readers not to place too much faith in Nemesis, as a gladiator’s fate also hinged on skill and chance. Glaucus, whose inscription features depictions of a retiarius’s weapons, indicating he was likely a retiarius, must have been a skilled fighter, as his tomb was funded partly by his supporters.

In a house in Verona, just outside the ancient Roman walls, a mosaic depicting gladiatorial games was uncovered, dating from the Flavian era to the early 2nd century. The mosaic features a central panel with geometric patterns, dolphins, and plant motifs within circles. Surrounding these are panels portraying gladiators, particularly the three central ones. As a purely decorative piece, it is unlikely to depict specific games held in the Verona amphitheatre, yet it includes inscriptions with gladiators’ names, possibly famous local figures.

The mosaic shows a retiarius versus a secutor, with the retiarius on the ground and a referee intervening. Above, the gladiators’ names are nearly faded, but a V (for vicit, “he won”) appears over the secutor, and ISS—likely once MISS for missus, “spared”—over the retiarius. The central panel depicts a Thracian gladiator triumphing over a murmillo lying bloodied on the ground, with the referee raising the victor’s arm; the defeated gladiator’s name, Caecro, is visible. The third scene shows a retiarius defeating another gladiator, who rests his shield on the ground in surrender.

The existence of a gladiatorial barracks in Verona is confirmed by an inscription housed at the Maffeian Lapidary Museum, though some scholars suggest it may refer to an enclosed, open-air area for youths’ physical and recreational activities, not necessarily ruling out a barracks in the classical era.

=== Medieval history ===
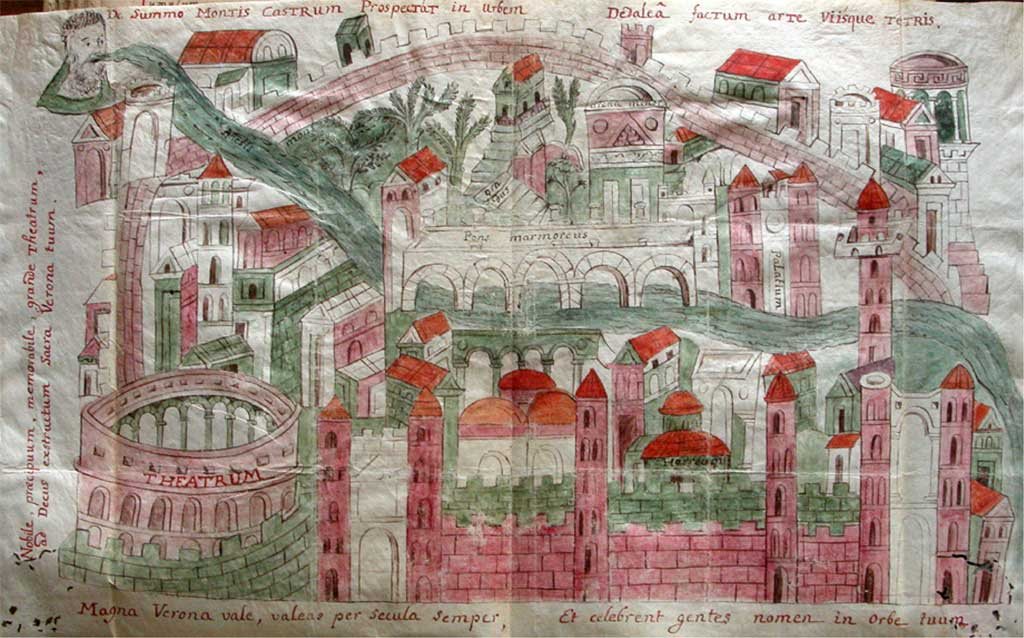
Raterian Iconography, the oldest depiction of Verona, prominently featuring the amphitheatre still in excellent condition.

During the Romano-Germanic kingdom of Theodoric the Great, the Verona amphitheatre likely underwent maintenance work and hosted spectacles, leading several medieval chronicles to attribute its construction to Theodoric:

In the same city, he built a vast house that astonishingly resembles the theatre of Romulus. It has a single entrance and exit, with circular steps allowing easy ascent despite its extraordinary height. It accommodates many thousands of men, who can see and hear one another. There is no certainty about its founder, as this building is still called the house of Theodoric today.

— Chronicon Gozecense, 12th century.

It was under Theodoric that the amphitheatre suffered its most severe damage. The discovery within the Theodoric walls of a block inscribed with the number LXIII from the amphitheatre indicates that much of the outer ring was demolished during the construction of this defensive wall, which extensively reused salvaged materials. This partial demolition was necessary both to procure building materials and to reduce the Arena’s height, deemed too vulnerable if captured during a siege. The structure retained the functionality of its cavea and the ability to host spectacles, as the height reduction of about 12 meters affected only the upper gallery, not the seating tiers.

Subsequent damage to the amphitheatre resulted from natural disasters, including the Adige flood of 589, the earthquake of 1116, and the catastrophic earthquake of January 3, 1117. During the reign of Berengar, the first devastating invasions by the Hungarians forced defenders to bolster fortifications, using the Arena as a stronghold. In those years, Verona’s bishop Ratherius created the so-called Raterian Iconography, depicting Verona as it appeared in the mid-10th century, with its churches, gates, bridges, and walls. The Arena is shown with its outer ring still intact, accompanied by verses describing it as a labyrinth of dark galleries. (Note: The iconography can be translated as: “From the hilltop, the Castle gazes toward the city, crafted with Daedalus-worthy skill, with dark galleries, the noble, distinguished, memorable, grand theatre [the Arena], built for your honor, sacred Verona. Great Verona, farewell, live through the centuries, and may all peoples celebrate your name worldwide.”)

On certain occasions, the Arena’s cavea was quarried for marble to support new constructions, particularly after the fire that ravaged the city in 1172. In the 13th century, the first efforts to halt the amphitheatre’s destruction emerged through restorations and commitments outlined in the municipal statutes of 1228. During the communal and Scaliger periods, legal battles reminiscent of ancient gladiatorial games were held within the Arena: to settle uncertain trials, litigants could hire professional fighters, known as champions. These contests drew crowds cheering for their favored combatant, with the oiled, naked fighters determining the trial’s outcome through their strength. Even Dante attended at least one such event, describing it in a canto of the Inferno:

As champions stripped and oiled are wont to do,
Watching for their advantage and their hold.
Before they come to blows and thrusts between them,
Thus, wheeling round, did every one his visage
Direct to me, so that in opposite wise
His neck and feet continual journey made.

— Dante Alighieri, Inferno - Canto Sixteen, vv. 22-27.

In 1278, at the behest of Alberto I della Scala, nearly 200 Cathar heretics captured in Sirmione by his brother Mastino I della Scala were burned at the stake within the Arena. It was also Alberto I who introduced regulations on the amphitheatre’s use: the 1276 statute decreed that prostitutes could reside solely within the Arena, while the 1310 update mandated its closure and imposed fines for breaking the gates or relieving oneself inside.

These provisions seem contradictory—mentioning prostitutes inhabiting the arcades while simultaneously ordering closure—but this reflects a distinction, persisting until the 1800s, between the inhabited outer arcades and the enclosed inner cavea. Exceptions occurred, such as in 1382, when 25 days of festivities, including jousts and spectacles, were held inside for the wedding of Antonio della Scala to Samaritana da Polenta.

In 1337, the city, indebted from a war against an anti-Veronese league, ceded the Arena’s rental income to the University of Citizens (a consortium of municipal creditors) with the consent of Mastino II della Scala. The monument would not be fully redeemed until 1586.

=== Early modern history ===
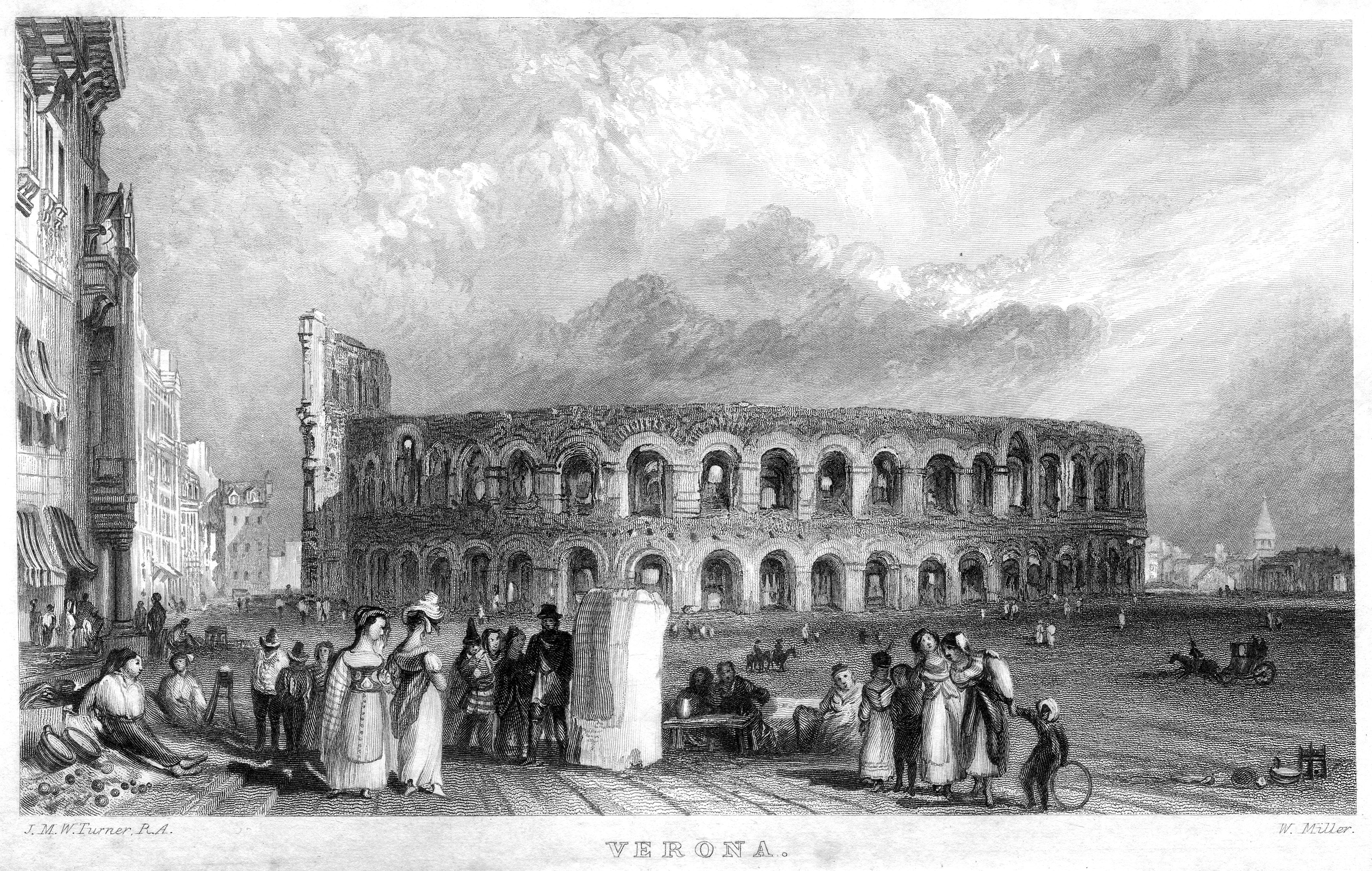
An engraving from the early 1800s.

In 1450, under the Venetian government, new statutes were compiled, including provisions for the Arena, with one particularly significant decree:

Since many crimes are committed in the Arena, and as it is a memorable building that brings honor to the city and should be kept clean, it is established that said Arena must remain closed, with the keys to its gates held in the city’s treasury by the treasurer. Anyone breaking the gates or wall shall be fined 25 lire, and the same penalty applies to anyone destroying a step, moving, or causing a stone to fall for removal from the Arena, and they must repair the damage at their own expense. Anyone bringing and unloading carts of earth, mud, or other materials into or around the Arena shall be fined 100 soldi and must remove the material at their own cost. The jurors of the surrounding districts and those residing in the Arena are obliged to report violations, with the accuser receiving half the fine.

— Statuti Veronesi, Book IV, Chap. 56

The same statute also reaffirmed that prostitutes were required to live in the Arena. This is the earliest official document describing the building as memorable, sparking its celebration by literati and a growing interest during the Renaissance in its critical and historical analysis. In Verona’s 1400s cultural milieu, architects and artists like Giovanni Maria Falconetto and Fra Giovanni da Verona rediscovered the Arena’s architectural significance, fundamentally shifting its medieval perception as a labyrinthine relic. Subsequently, figures such as Giovanni Caroto, Sebastiano Serlio, Antonio da Sangallo the Younger, Baldassarre Peruzzi, and Andrea Palladio studied and surveyed it, proposing solutions to ensure its preservation.

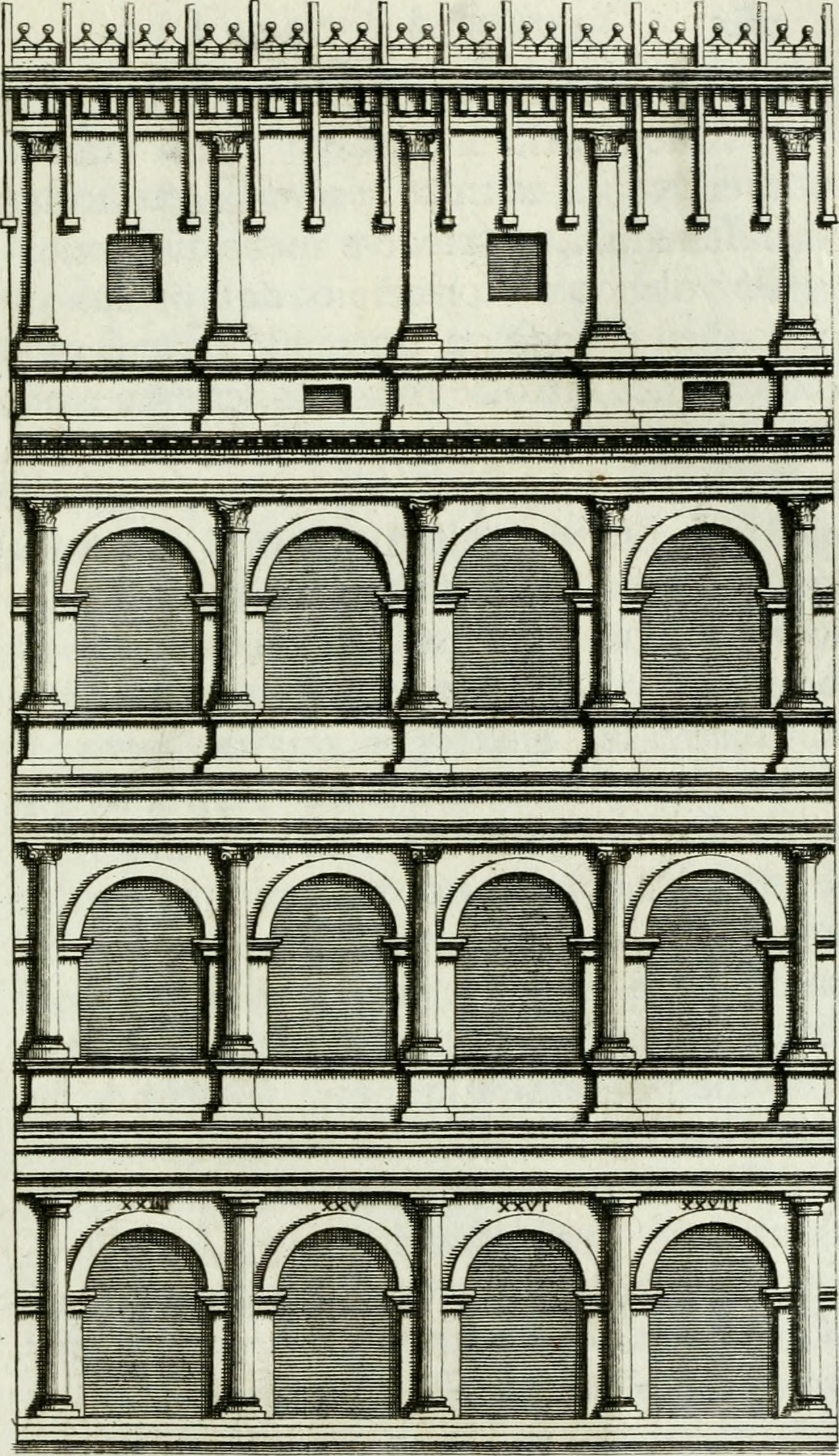
A survey of the surviving wing of the amphitheatre, from Verona illustrata by Scipione Maffei.

The amphitheatre thus began to hold great importance for the civic community. Verona was the first city, as early as the 1500s, to initiate a series of efforts prioritizing the protection and restoration of antiquities. A key step was the partial redemption of the mortgage from the University of Citizens, enabling the expulsion of prostitutes from the arcades in 1537, which were then leased to artisans and merchants.

In the mid-16th century, a gradual renewal of Bra, the large square facing the amphitheatre commenced, amid widespread concern for the city and its main monument. In May 1568, a restoration of the amphitheatre—then in a state of neglect—was approved, based on a plan inspired by the studies of architects such as Caroto and Palladio. The restoration, focusing on the cavea, began but was halted in 1575 due to a severe plague afflicting the Scaliger city. By 1586, the municipality fully redeemed the Arena from the University of Citizens.

Further restoration resumed in 1651 but paused in 1682, with additional significant interventions in 1694 and 1699, including partial repairs to the seating tiers. In the early 1700s, major maintenance ceased to allow for archaeological excavations within the Roman amphitheatre. These began in 1710 with Ottavio Alecchi, who uncovered the central well and an elliptical channel facing the first step, noting it was once covered by stone slabs with central circular holes 7 cm in diameter.

In 1728, Marquis Scipione Maffei, a pivotal figure in the study and restoration of the monumental structure, published Degli Anfiteatri e singolarmente del Veronese, marking a significant shift toward a scientific and archaeological approach to the monument, prioritizing its preservation. In this work, he criticized excavations in the cavea that altered its original internal configuration. For this text, Maffei conducted thorough historical research and monument surveys, including excavations that yielded several finds.

He identified key archaeological issues: the division of the seating tiers into sections and wedges; the crowning of the upper interior with a loggia; the placement and height of the podium, which he calculated at 1.53 meters and later reconstructed; the purpose of underground conduits, which he argued could not have flooded the Arena; and the central well, previously thought to support the velarium, but which he interpreted as a rainwater drainage system.

From September 1728 to July 1729, significant efforts cleared a 120 cm layer of earth covering the arena floor, while from 1731 to 1735, the wing was restored and reinforced. Work resumed in 1761, with tasks including excavation, surveying the ellipse, the euripus, and the podium, as well as creating a model up to the second tier of vomitoria to accurately reposition the steps, initiating a thorough revision of prior, less rigorous efforts. These works halted in 1772 due to funding shortages, resumed in 1780, and stopped again three years later.

==== Jousts ====
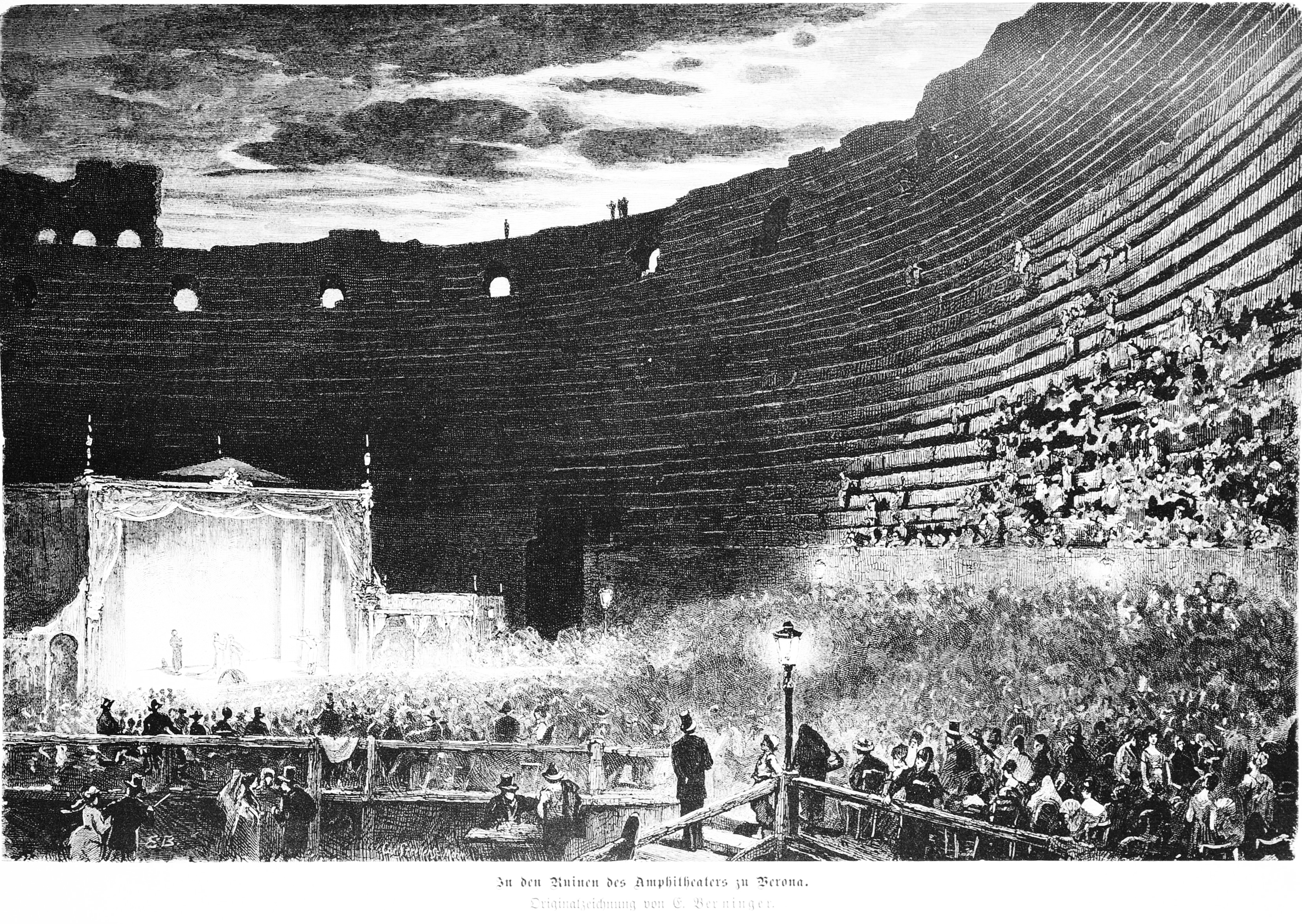
An illustration of a spectacle within the Arena.

On February 26, 1590, the first documented joust took place inside the Arena, despite the ordinance to keep the cavea closed not yet being lifted, though it was gradually falling into disuse. Its use remained exceptional until the 17th century, when the interior, alongside the exterior, began to be leased out. On May 29, 1622, a Giostra della Quintana was held inside, described by chroniclers for its participation of knights not only from Verona but also from abroad, including some from Sweden. Another memorable joust occurred on May 4, 1654.

Daytime spectacles within the amphitheatre became immensely popular in the 18th century, with the last joust held on November 20, 1716, in honor of the Elector of Bavaria, organized by Scipione Maffei, who lamented that Verona’s nobles no longer held such events there. From that year, contracts leasing the monument’s interior shifted from equestrian activities to troupes of actors and dancers, who erected stages within the arena. The first precisely documented performance was Maffei’s Merope, staged in July 1713 by Luigi Riccoboni’s company. Carlo Goldoni attended one such show in July 1733, leaving a description in his Memoirs of the setting and atmosphere, with nobles and the wealthy seated in chairs and the common folk on the tiers.

Among occasional attractions, in January 1751, a rhinoceros stunned spectators, who could scarcely believe such a creature existed. The most favored spectacle, however, was bull hunting, pitting a bull (or sometimes oxen) against dogs trained by butchers. In September 1786, Goethe visited Verona and marveled at the amphitheatre—the first major ancient monument he encountered—noting with surprise that the popular pallone game was not held inside.

=== Contemporary history ===
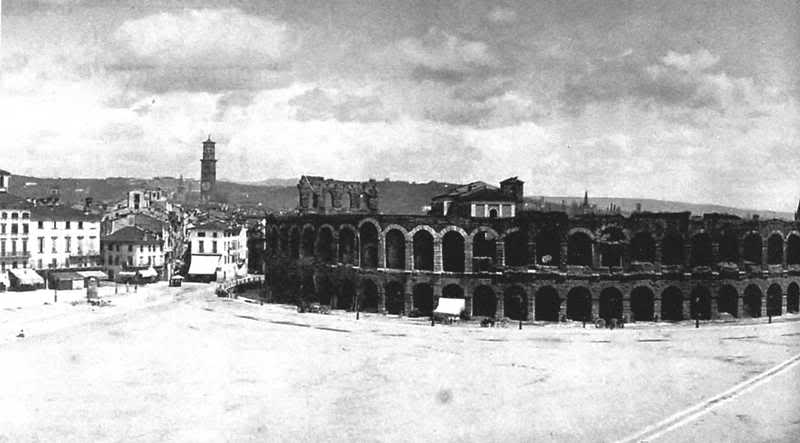
The Arena and the Piazza Bra after the general leveling carried out in 1820.

In 1805, under French rule, Napoleon Bonaparte visited the amphitheatre on June 15, witnessing a bull hunt inside. During this visit, the government allocated funds for its restoration: Luigi Trezza was tasked with planning the work, aiming to replace missing steps, restore the podium, repair the most damaged vaults, refurbish staircases to the first and second tiers of vomitoria, and the larger stairs to the third tier, and seal cracks in the seating tiers. Trezza devised a stucco for the fissures—used until 1825—made of quicklime, crushed bricks, and iron filings.

On January 1, 1807, the Deputation for Public Ornament was established, tasked with preserving the Arena. In 1816, following Verona’s transfer to the Kingdom of Lombardy–Venetia, it was renamed the Commission for Ornament. In 1817, excavations outside the amphitheatre traced the continuation of the channel aligned with its major axis, followed as far as Palazzo Ridolfi, as noted by an inscription there, and uncovered the foundations of the Gallienus walls, which intersected the channel.

In 1820, the municipality ordered the eviction of residents from the Arena, assigning 42 arcades for storage use. Evicting 36 tenants was a crucial step toward the monument’s reclamation and comprehensive restoration. This met fierce resistance from occupants, some of whom claimed centuries-long tenure passed down through generations. That same year, Podestà Da Persico met with Austrian Emperor Francis I to outline the monument’s needs, prompting the municipality to develop a work plan.

The project focused on the exterior, demolishing houses too close to the Arena and excavating around it to expose its base, buried about two meters deep due to sediment from repeated floods until the construction of retaining walls. The average level of the Bra was also lowered by about 70 cm, sloping gently from the Gran Guardia toward the Arena, and the Liston’s elevation was adjusted. This transformed the square before the Arena and the Arena itself: lowering the square restored the monument’s proportions, while demolishing the New Mercy Hospital, fourteen houses toward San Nicolò, and military furnaces abutting the municipal walls, alongside the Gran Guardia’s completion, lent greater space and coherence to the ensemble.

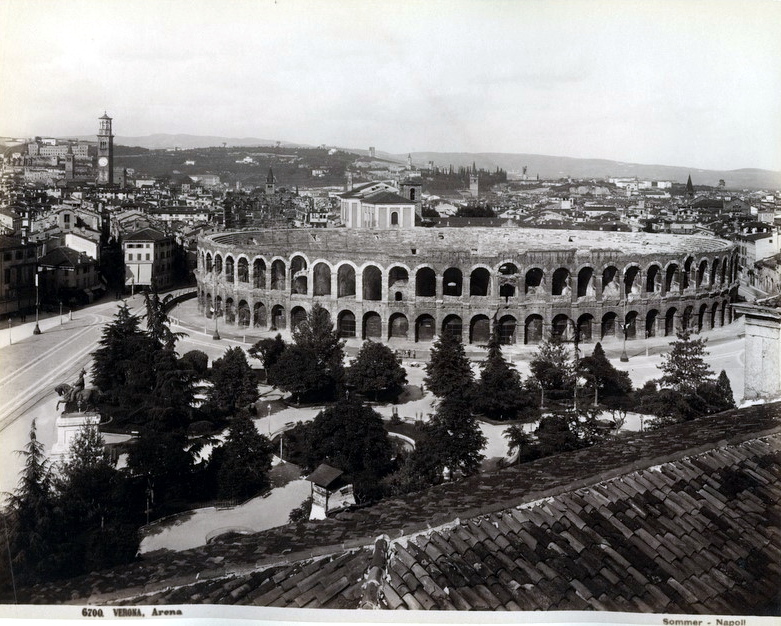
Piazza Bra after the creation of the central gardens in 1873.

In 1866, Veneto joined the Kingdom of Italy, yet the Commission for Ornament persisted, renamed the Commission for Civic Ornament. In 1876, it was replaced by the Advisory Commission for Monument Conservation, established in each province of the kingdom. During this period, Count Antonio Pompei emerged as Verona’s most active figure in addressing restoration challenges, publishing essays between 1872 and 1877 aimed at reconstructing the amphitheatre’s original appearance. He also oversaw the restoration of the third tier of vomitoria, though uncertainties during the work prevented a full overhaul of the cavea.

During World War II, the Superintendency for Monuments, led by architect Piero Gazzola, installed temporary buttresses inside and outside the wing to shield it from bombings. After the war, these were removed, and the wing was statically reinforced according to the design of engineer Riccardo Morandi: a post-tensioning system inserted 5 mm steel cables into holes drilled from above, aligned with the pillars, then filled with pressurized liquid cement. This reinforcement of the wing’s five vertical pillars occurred between 1953 and 1956.

Further interventions from 1954 to 1960 cleared remaining arcades of warehouses and shops, demolishing non-original structures such as partition slabs, wooden stairs, internal tiled roofs, and counter-walls. In 1955, about fifty wooden gates were replaced with the current iron ones. From 1957 to 1959, the lower ramps of four internal staircases were restored, arcade floors were paved with pebbles, central stone walkways were laid in the ambulacra, underground conduits and the central well were cleaned, the entire outer ring was restored, and cracks between the cavea’s steps were sealed. In 1960, the old central pit cover was demolished, a new slab was built, and an iron railing was installed along the top step to prevent spectators from falling, despite some controversy.

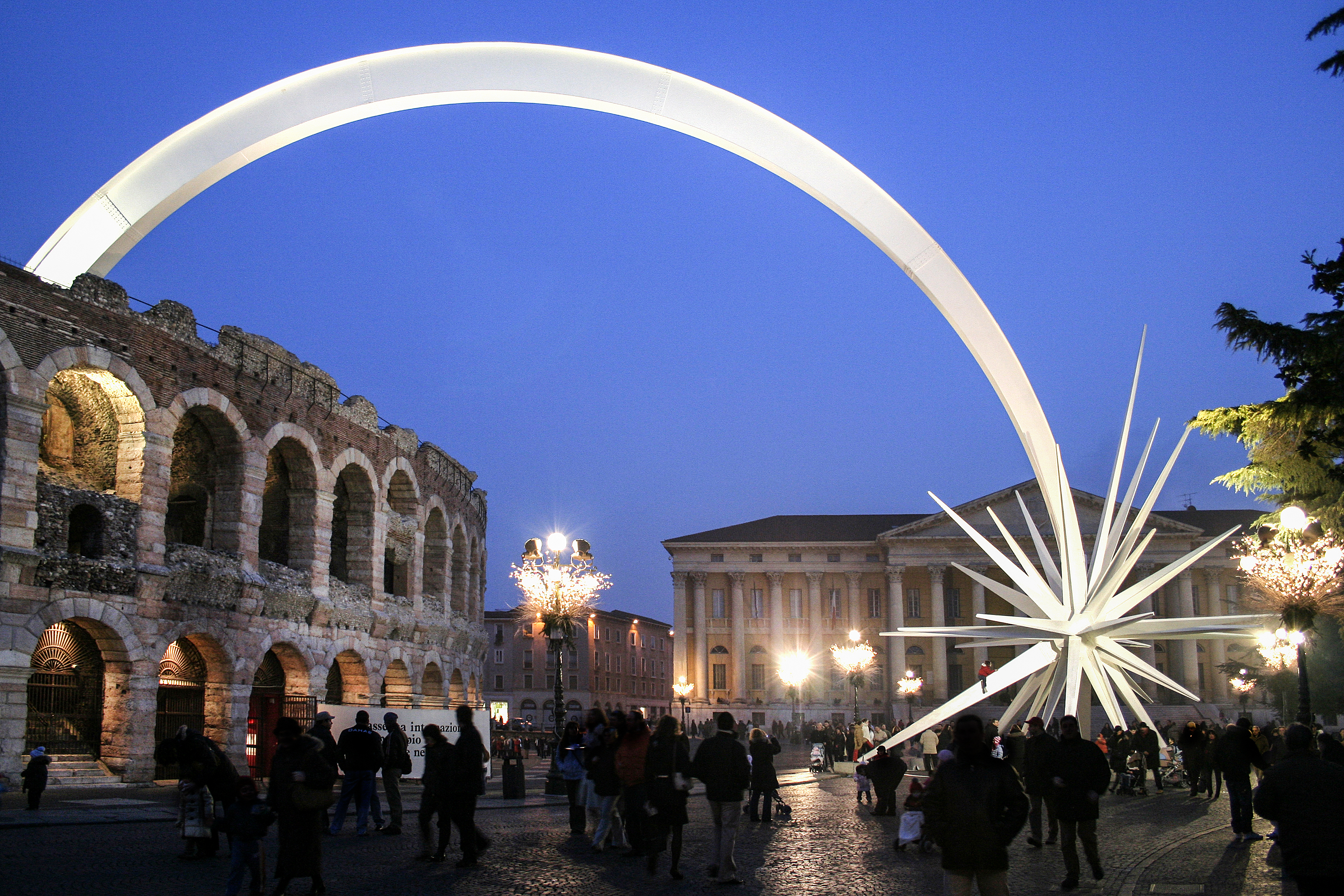
The comet star in January 2007

Since 1984, during the Christmas season, a steel comet star designed by architect Rinaldo Olivieri, 70 meters high and 82 meters long, was placed in Piazza Bra, with its tail resting inside the Arena. However, in January 2023, during routine dismantling, part of the star fell, causing irreparable damage to several steps; consequently, from Christmas 2024, only the star’s “head” has been installed, with its traditional tail replaced by light beams.

==== Performances and opera ====
Bull hunting remained popular into the early 1800s, even earning Napoleon Bonaparte’s approval. Later that year, the Arena served as a detention camp for Austrian prisoners, who dismantled the comedy stage for firewood. In November 1807, Napoleon, revisiting Verona, observed the start of another bull hunt.

In May 1815, marking Verona’s return to the Austrian Empire and a visit by Archduke Heinrich Johann Bellegarde, viceroy of the Kingdom of Lombardy–Venetia, a bull hunt was held, followed by corn distribution to the poor—a common blend of entertainment and charity. In March 1816, to celebrate Emperor Francis I and his wife Maria Ludovika, bull hunting was replaced by a jockey race, preceded by corn distribution via carts sent to parishes.

On November 24, 1822, concluding the Congress of Verona, a grand choreography with a lyrical prelude, The Holy Alliance, was staged. The text was by Gaetano Rossi, with music composed and conducted by Gioachino Rossini: the spectacle opened with Fate summoning four chariots from different directions—those of Minerva (with allegories of arts, abundance, and happiness), Ceres (with nymphs and commerce), Neptune (with maritime spirits), and Mars (with strength, valor, and warriors). Four different dances unfolded as the chariots went around in circles, ensuring that all spectators could see the performance, culminating in a collective display around a statue of Concordia.

In the 1800s, equestrian competitions, cycling races, hot air balloon displays, acrobatic gymnastics, comedies, and tombola games were highly popular. Notable events included the 1838 tombola attended by Emperor Ferdinand I, highlighted by thousands of colorful umbrellas opening during a downpour, and the 1857 event with Emperor Franz Joseph, featuring a widely enjoyed tombola and greasy pole spectacle. Rossini’s music returned to the Arena on July 31, 1842, following the success of his Stabat Mater at the Teatro Filarmonico ten days earlier.

The first opera season occurred in 1856, with performances of Il Casino di Campagna and La fanciulla di Gand by Pietro Lenotti, the first act of Gaetano Donizetti’s L’elisir d’amore, and Rossini’s The Barber of Seville. The Arena also served civic purposes, hosting the November 16, 1866, celebration of Veneto’s annexation to the Kingdom of Italy in the presence of Victor Emmanuel II. After 1866, as Verona remained a military city, the army grew closer to the populace, occasionally staging carousel spectacles inside. The first Sunday of June featured a fireworks display for the Albertine Statute celebration.

From the early 1900s until the 1913 Aida that launched the Arena di Verona Festival, circus performances were the most successful shows. Since 1913, the Verona amphitheatre has become the world’s largest open-air opera venue, preserving its role as a space for popular entertainment while upholding the monument’s dignity. It has also occasionally hosted gladiators, wild beasts, and Christian persecutions for historical film productions.

==== Other events ====
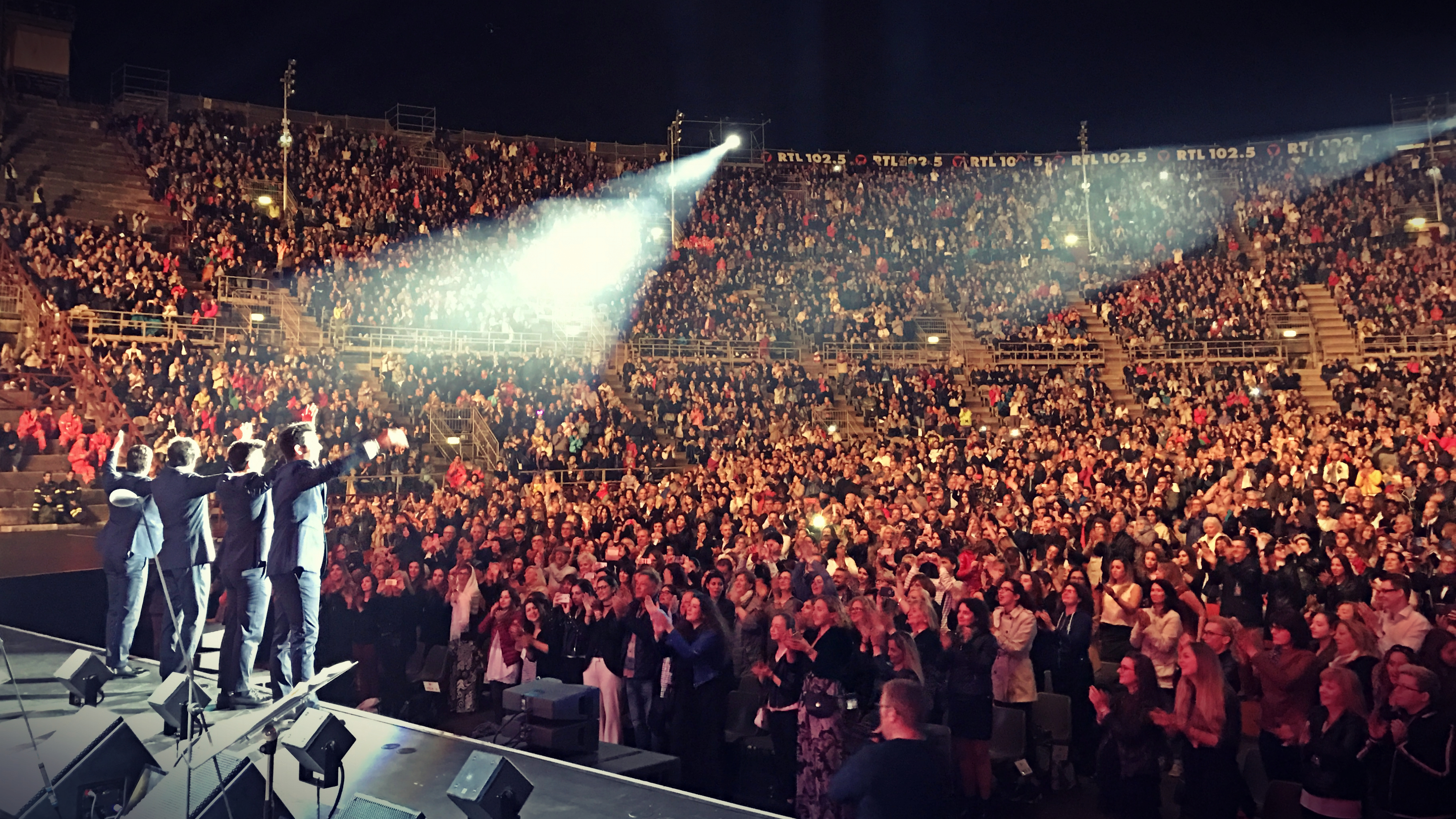
Il Volo performing on the Arena stage in 2017.

In music, the Arena of Verona has historically hosted the finals of the Festivalbar, and since 2017, it has been the venue for the annual Power Hits Estate, an awards event organized by RTL 102.5. It has also welcomed numerous pop concerts, leveraging the prestige of this unique open-air theatre, featuring a wide array of Italian and international artists. Zucchero Fornaciari holds the record for fourteen consecutive performances.

The Verona amphitheatre hosted the final of the 1970 edition of the television program Games Without Borders.

In sports, the Arena has served as the finish line for the final stage of the Giro d'Italia in the 1981, 1984, 2010, 2019, and 2022 editions. In May 1988, at the twilight of the Cold War, it hosted a historic friendly volleyball match between the men's national teams of the United States and the Soviet Union. In August 2023, it welcomed the opening match of the 2023 Women’s European Volleyball Championship between Italy and Romania. In 2026, the Arena hosted the closing ceremony of the Winter Olympics and the opening ceremony of the Winter Paralympics. Preparations for both events included renovations to improve safety and accessibility.

The Verona amphitheatre was constructed approximately 70–80 meters from the Republican city walls, facing the southern corner of the city’s fortifications. This positioning indicates it was not part of the original city plan, much like the Theatrum Veronense. The mid-1st century BC, when the city was refounded within the Adige’s bend, was a time of civil wars, making it impractical to build such a massive structure near the walls, which would have compromised the defensive system.

Thus, it is deduced that the amphitheatre was erected during a period of peace, likely coinciding with the onset of the imperial era. Supporting this, in the 3rd century, amid the crisis, military anarchy, and barbarian invasions, Emperor Gallienus deemed it necessary to build a new wall incorporating the Arena.

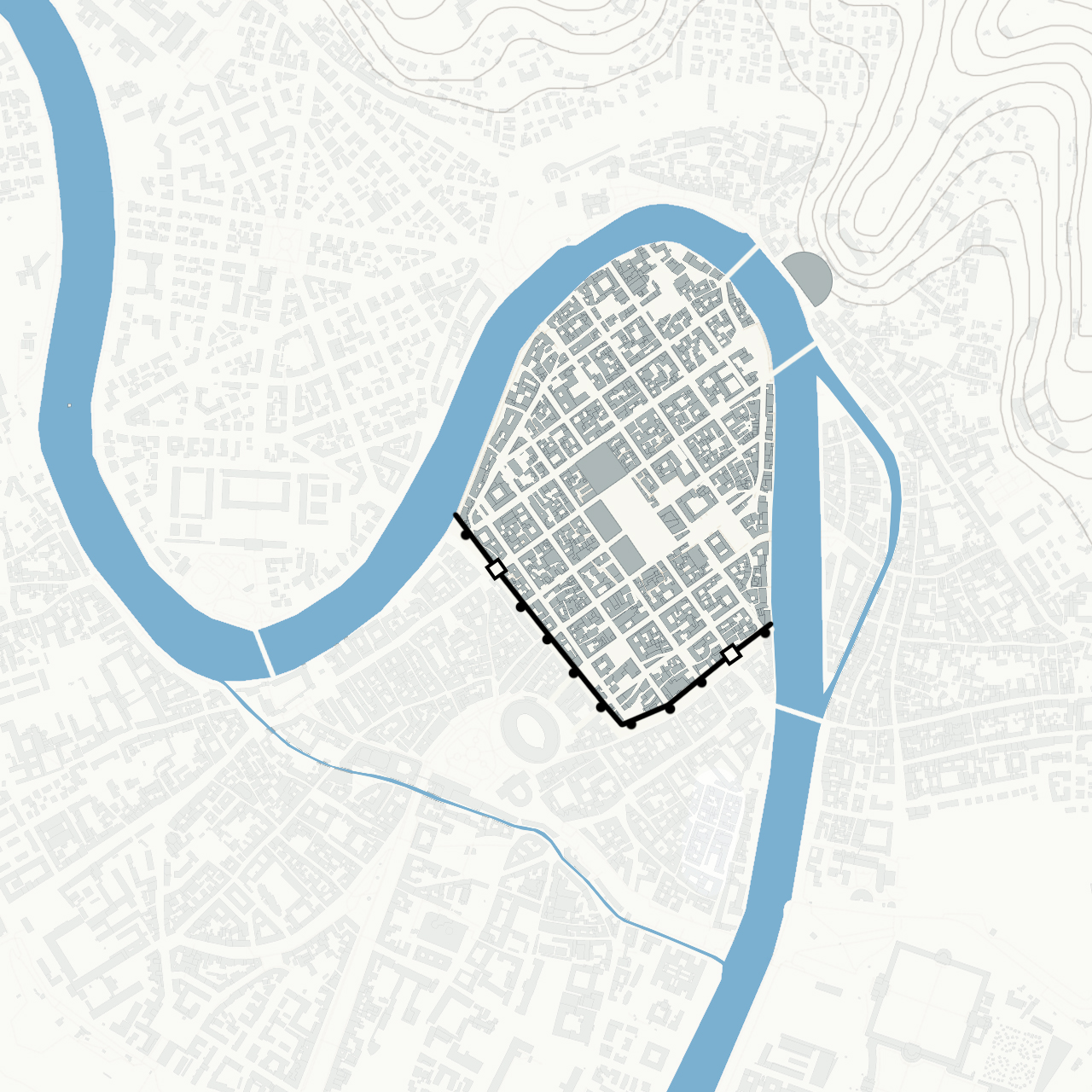
A reconstruction of Verona in the Republican era, before the amphitheatre’s construction outside of the city walls.

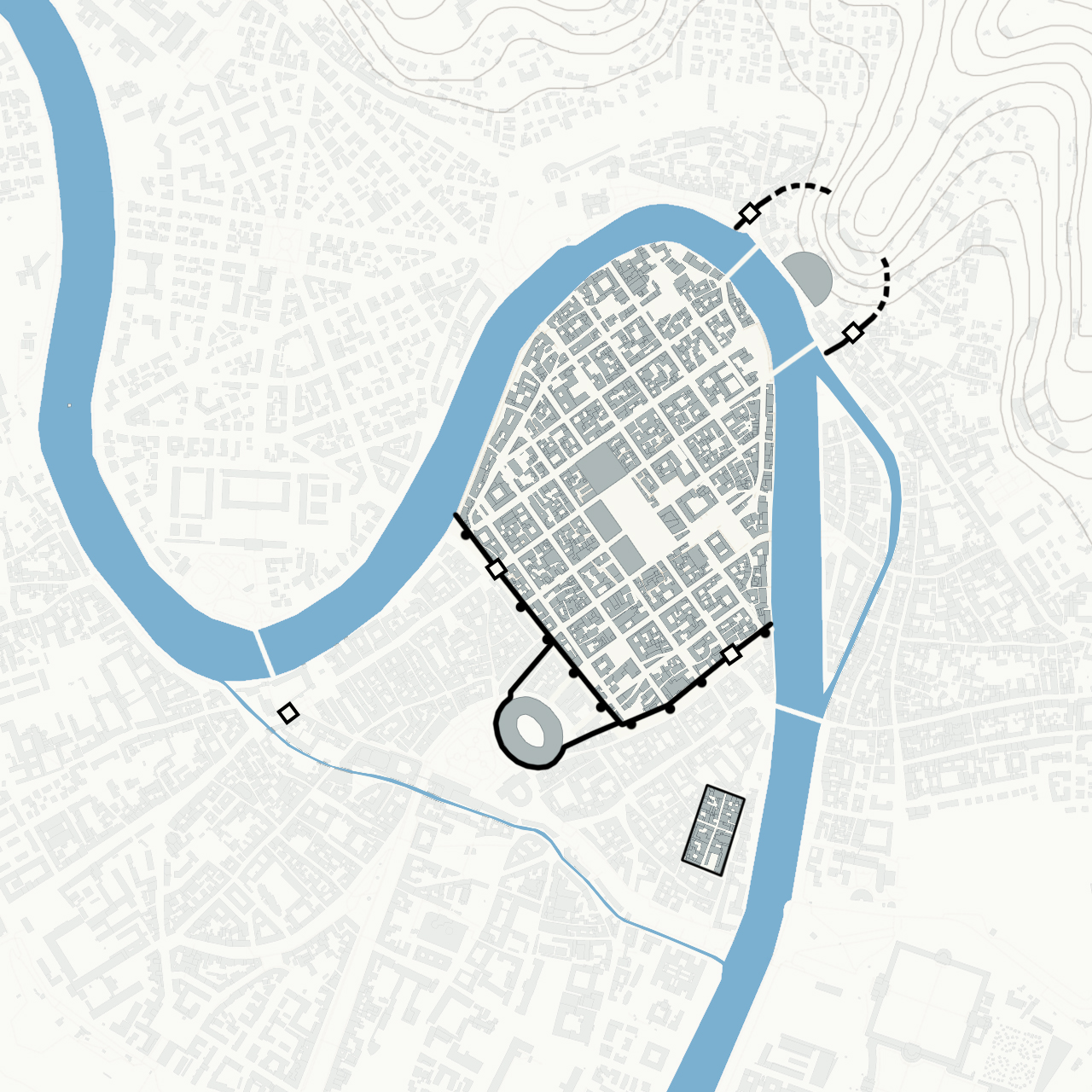
A reconstruction of Verona in the Imperial era, with the amphitheatre enclosed within the city walls.

Verona in Ancient Times

Its location outside the walls suggests that the city’s interior was nearly fully developed. This placement also necessitated a rethinking of road networks, as the amphitheatre drew tens of thousands from the city, countryside, and nearby towns, potentially overwhelming access gates, notably, the Via Postumia, entering at Porta Borsari, was already very busy.

Consequently, Porta Leoni and Porta Borsari were refurbished, and two smaller exits were likely added near the amphitheatre. Its orientation further underscores its connection to the city despite its later construction: the major axis aligns with the urban grid’s cardines, and the minor axis parallels the decumani. This alignment facilitated linking the amphitheatre’s sewers to the city’s system.

Notably, its external position eased access from the countryside and other cities. Spectacles, held infrequently due to their high cost, naturally attracted audiences from beyond Verona.

== Inscriptions ==
Several inscriptions found near the amphitheatre, given its size, undoubtedly pertain to it. One, indecipherable, reads CON, while another appears to be [...] ET DEDIT. A complete inscription states:

Nomine
Q(uinti) Domini Alpini
Licinia mater
signum Dianae et venatoriem et salientes t(estamento) f(ieri) i(ussit)

It records that a wealthy woman, in her son’s name, bequeathed funds to erect a statue of Diana, stage a hunting spectacle (venatio) in the Arena, and install salientes—possibly water conduits or fountains—within the amphitheatre.

Additionally, an original Arena step was found, inscribed with a seat number: I / LOC(US) IIII, LIN(EA) I, meaning wedge one, step four, seat one.

== Description ==
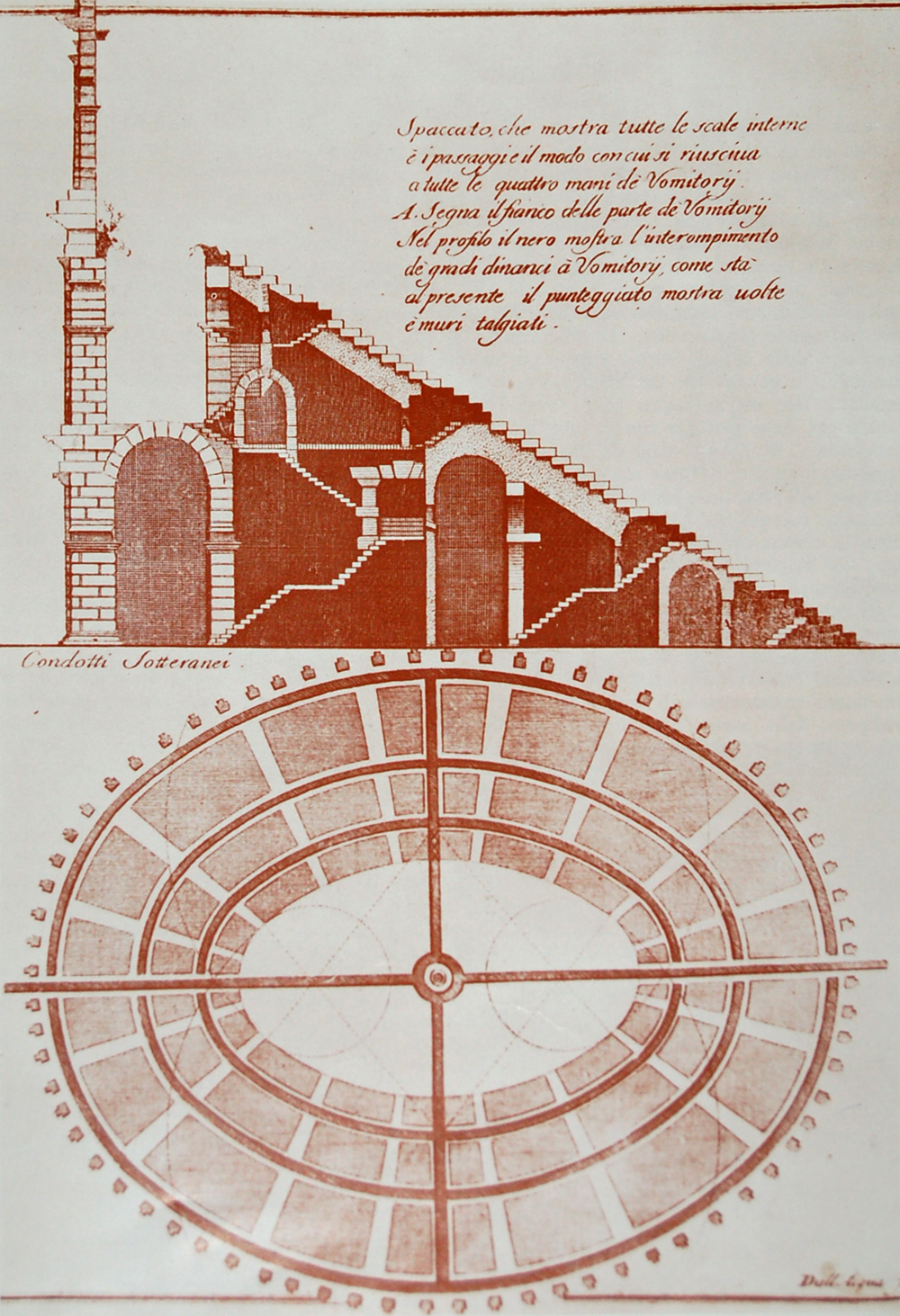
A cross-section from the wing side showing stairs and passages, and a map of the amphitheatre with sewers marked.

The amphitheatre's foundational layout is an ellipse forming the arena (the central performance space), likely traced on the ground at the project's outset. The outer perimeter was derived by drawing a concentric line around this ellipse. This base ellipse was constructed using four circles: two smaller ones (along the major axis) derived by dividing the semi-major axis into five 25-foot segments, with two segments forming the radius at the axis's ends, and a larger curve with a seven-part, 25-foot radius centered at the outer extension's end.

The arena measures 75.68 m × 44.43 m (250 × 150 Roman feet), a round figure reflecting the simplicity of the base module, with a 5:3 ratio between the major and minor axes. The cavea spans 39.40 m (125 feet), while the amphitheatre's maximum dimensions (major × minor axis) are 152.43 m × 123.23 m (520 × 420 Roman feet). These dimensions rank the Arena eighth among Roman amphitheatres and fourth in Italy, following the Colosseum, the Campanian Amphitheatre, and the Amphitheatre of Milan.

The amphitheatre was built on a slight artificial elevation (now below street level), with foundations of an opus caementicium plate. A 1.60 m height difference exists between the outermost ring and the podium base. Rainwater drainage, critical for such a large structure, was managed by three annular sewers beneath the floors of concentric galleries supporting the first level. Two additional sewers along the major and minor axes channeled runoff to the Adige, one explored for about 100 meters. This sewer system was highly efficient, with a consistent two-meter height. Constructed with sections of pebble masonry bound by mortar, interspersed with three horizontal brick rows, they were capped with large stone slabs—a technique mirrored in Verona's civic sewer system.

=== External structure ===
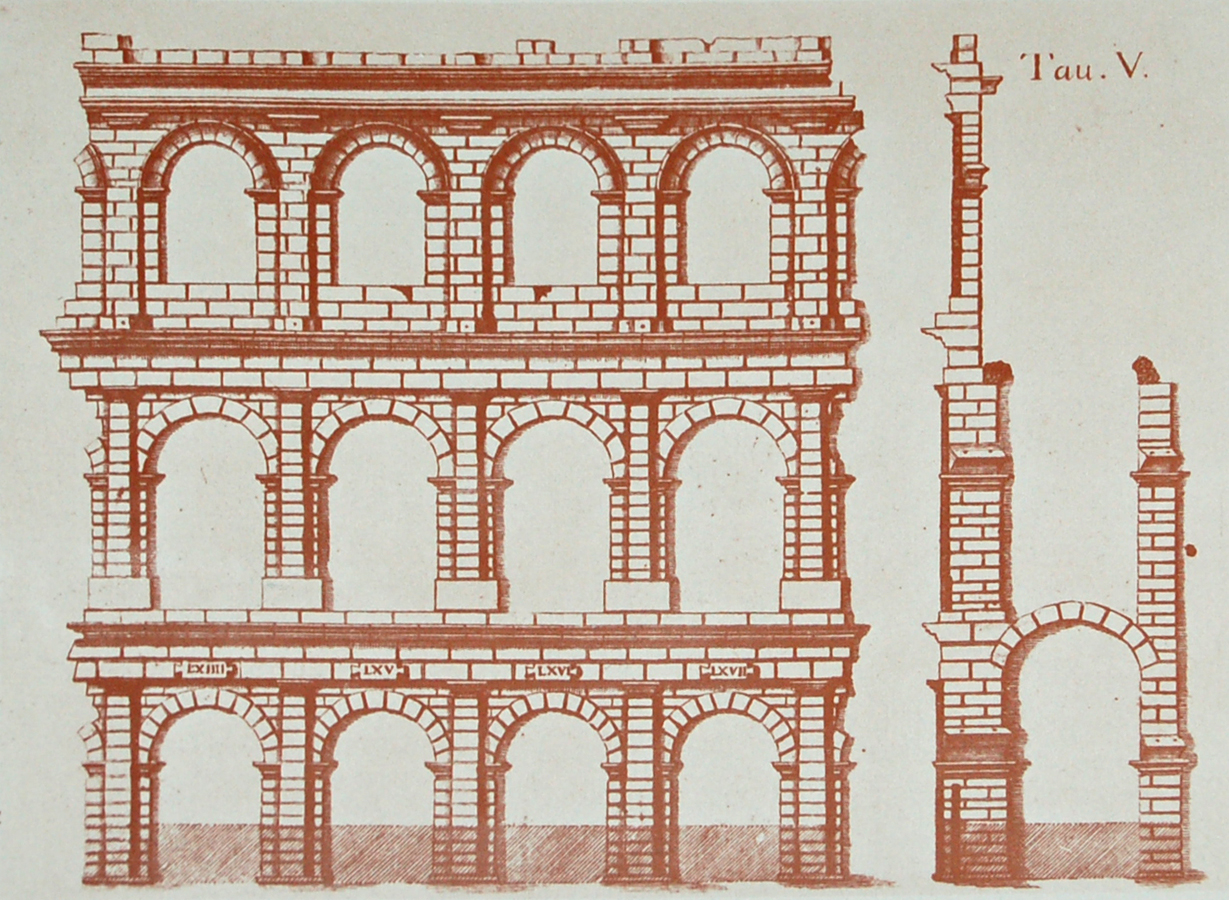
The wing of the Arena: this is how the original monumental façade appeared throughout the building.

The monument's current appearance differs significantly from its original form, particularly due to the loss of the outer ring, which served as the true monumental facade—a role now filled by the inner front. The only surviving segment of this outer ring is the Ala (wing), comprising four arches. This ring had no major structural purpose but acted as a grand facade: its arches mirrored the hollow spaces beneath the cavea, while massive pillars completed the internal lines of force. The three-tiered arcades externally expressed the presence of two galleries and an upper portico, with architraves capping the internal vaults. This design aesthetically and spatially articulated the complex internal volumes.

Connections between the facade and the underlying structure are limited to shared foundations and the barrel vaults of the third gallery and the one above. The facade features three stacked tiers of arches, built entirely from well-squared blocks of red ammonitic limestone, a stone prevalent in the province of Verona. The first-tier arches stand 7.10 m high, the second 6.30 m, and the third 4.50 m, enhancing the vertical thrust when viewed from below. The first-tier pillars measure 2.30 m wide by 2.15 m deep (nearly square), topped by a pilaster ending in a Tuscan capital at the cornice level.

Arches rest on two semi-capitals, terminating on the pilaster just above its midpoint. Above the Tuscan capitals, a band of blocks bears the entrance numbers (LXIV to LXVII survive on the Ala, with others scattered around), followed by another identical band supporting the upper cornice. With 72 arches and entrances, the numbering—starting with I at the western entrance—suggests that sector’s prominence, proceeding counterclockwise.

The second tier mirrors the first, save for its reduced height. The third tier varies slightly: Tuscan capitals persist without pilasters, and the cornice comprises a entablature with a frieze and additional cornice. Inside, brackets once supported portico beams, not the velarium, as some scholars speculated (its weight would have required external brackets).

Using the same order across all tiers is typical of amphitheatres like those in Nîmes or Pula.

=== Internal structure ===
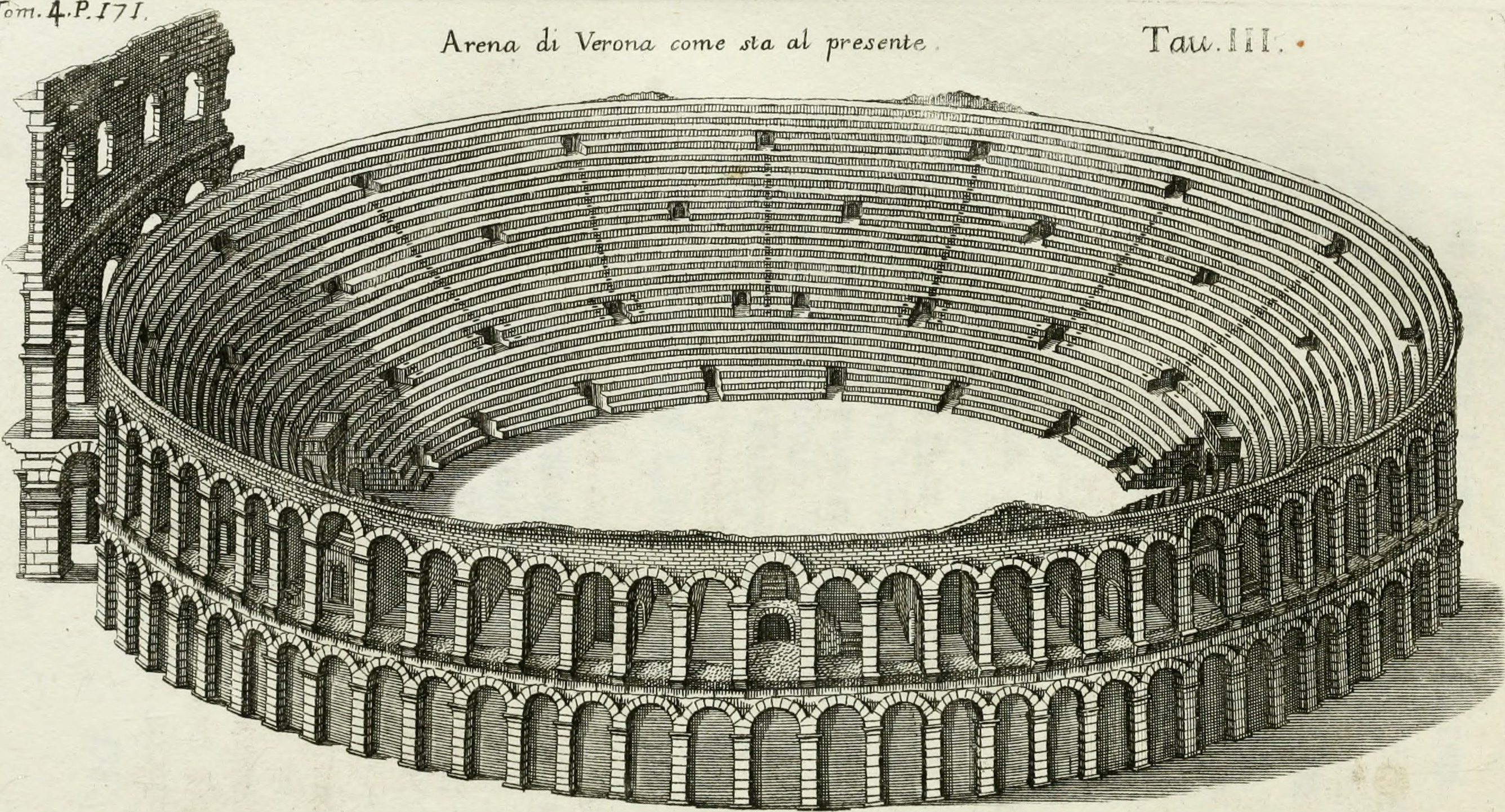
A bird’s-eye view from Verona illustrata by Scipione Maffei.

From the amphitheatre's interior, along the gallery axis, lies an opus caementicium mass 6.80 m from the cavea's outer edge, followed by the first gallery (3 m wide, 3.60 m high), then the second (3.30 m wide, 9.10 m high) 11.18 m beyond, and the third (4.30 m wide, 8.15 m high) 14.45 m from the second. Above the outermost gallery stood another of equal size, supporting the cavea's portico.

These three concentric galleries divided the structure into four zones. From the arena to the first gallery lies the first tier of seating, the maenianum. The first annular corridor, the praecinctio, rested on the first gallery's vault, separating the second seating tier between the first and second galleries. Above the second gallery's vault was the second annular corridor, dividing the second and third tiers. Here, the 64 vomitoria staircases become more intricate and begin intersecting. A third annular corridor separated the third and fourth tiers, followed by a portico aligned with the outermost gallery, its roof supported by a colonnade facing the cavea and brackets (still visible on the Ala) on the outer side.

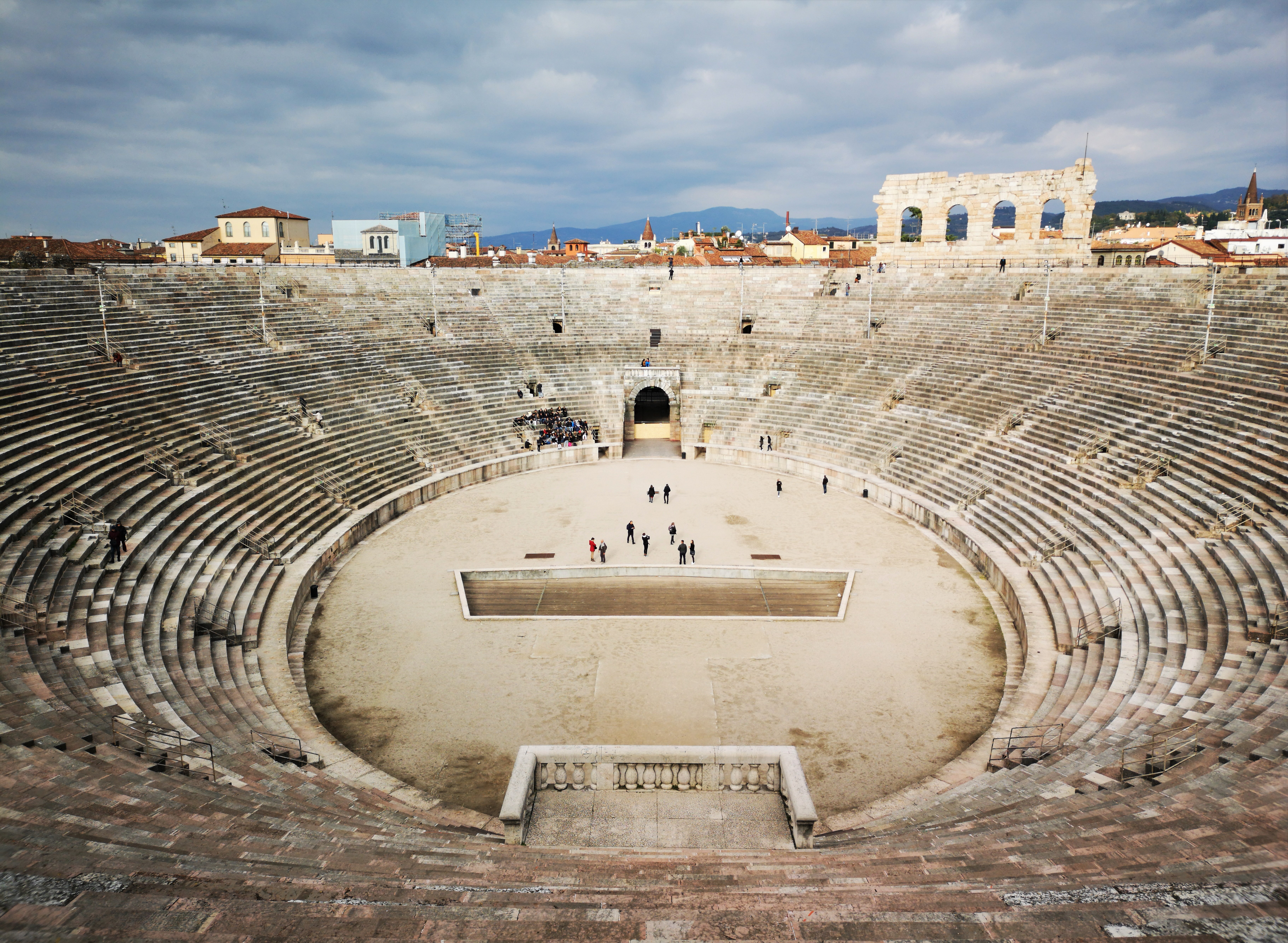
The cavea of the Arena.

The grandest entrance, to the west toward Porta Borsari and the Via Postumia, features a central vault twice the height of others, reaching beneath the cavea’s tiers. The western sector was likely the most significant, as evidenced by the differing staircase layouts: the western sector's symmetrical spaces feature straight corridors leading directly to lower tiers, while the eastern sector’s irregular corridors channeled most spectators to upper tiers. The western entrance likely welcomed the procession inaugurating the games.

=== Construction techniques and materials ===
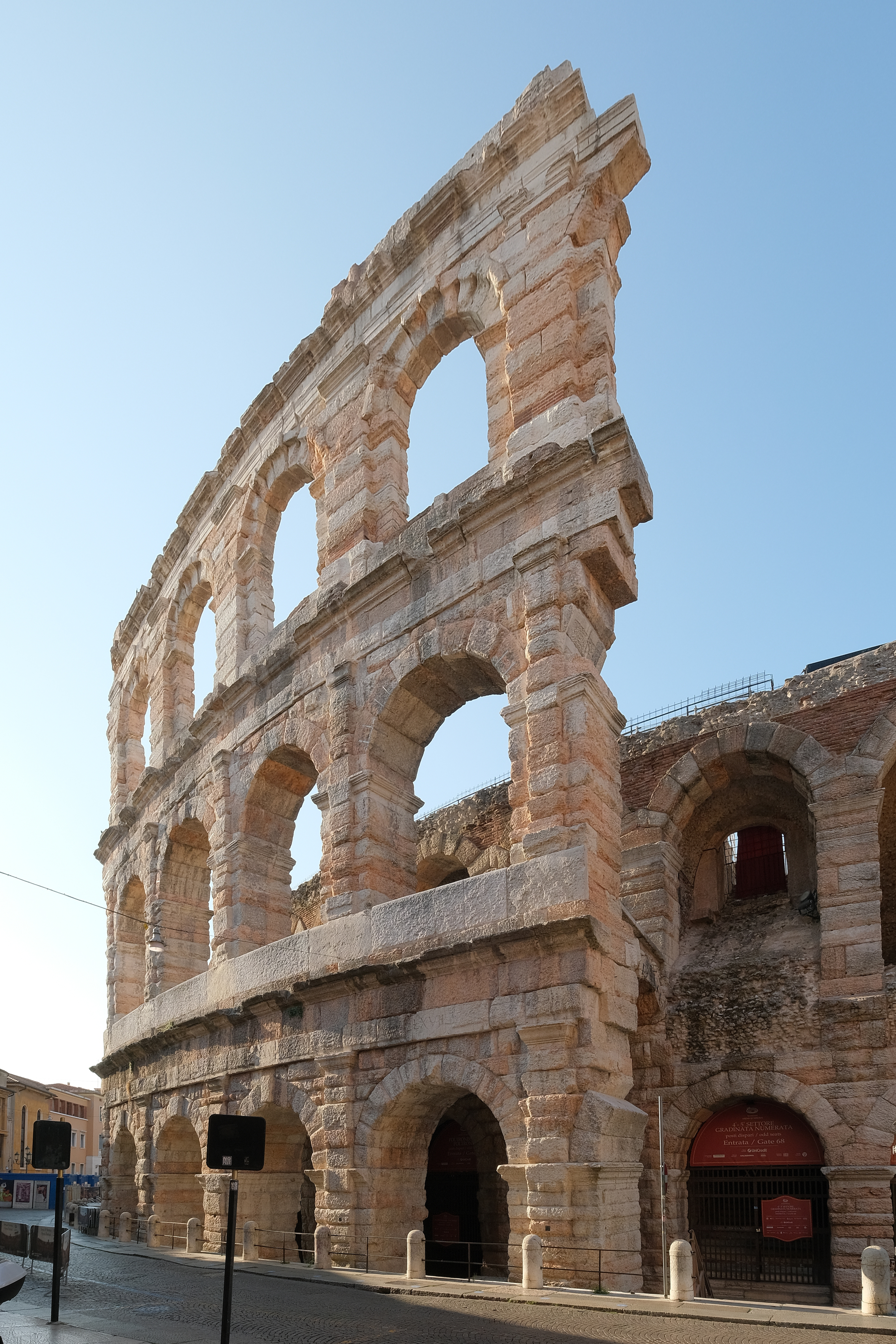
The Ala of the amphitheatre, built with cut stone from Valpolicella

The construction technique is standardized throughout, with materials undecorated beyond the architectural order on the exterior facade, though statues—some unearthed during excavations—are preserved at the Archaeological Museum at the Roman Theatre. The materials are consistent across the structure, reflecting its durability and limited renovations. The seating tiers, however, underwent repeated repairs due to constant wear and medieval quarrying; the Renaissance restoration further altered the original cavea layout, erasing corridors between sectors and complicating reconstruction of the 64 access staircases' exact positions, though all remain extant.

The outer facade and pillars were crafted from cut red ammonitic limestone from Valpolicella, a common Veronese calcareous stone, used in both pink and white variants creating a widespread dichromatism. Marble blocks were shaped to stack without mortar, with visible faces left unpolished for a rustication effect, speeding construction.

Rubble masonry was used for the interior walls, with a mixed facing of bricks and pebbles: alternating courses of large pebbles and three rows of dark red bricks (one or one-and-a-half feet, about 8 cm thick), with mortar joints of 1–2 cm. This technique dominates near entrances, while most of the structure comprises cementitious material poured into wooden formworks. The vaults are also opus caementicium of mortar and pebbles over wooden formworks, with board imprints still visible.

The sewers were constructed in mixed masonry, with pebble sections bound by mortar alternating with three brick rows, covered by large stone slabs. Beneath the arena lies a subterranean chamber (8.77 m wide, 36.16 m long) of unknown purpose.

=== Capacity ===
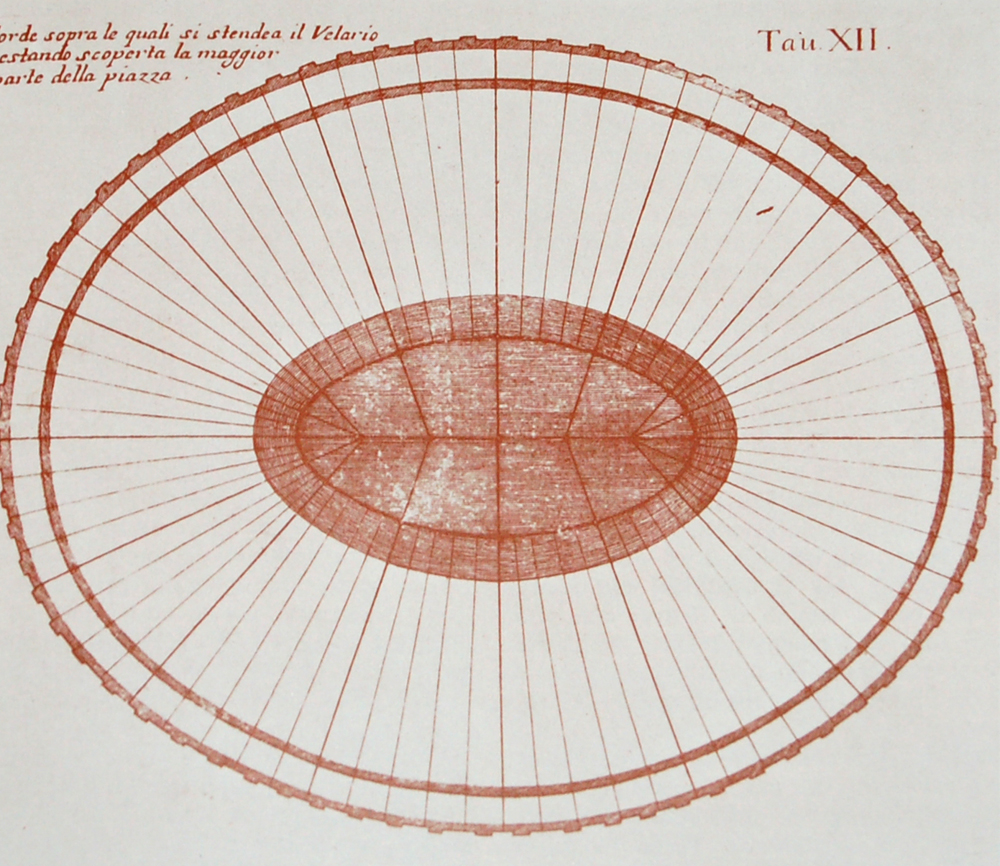
A zenithal depiction of how the velarium of the Verona amphitheatre might have been structured.

In the early 1st century, Verona was a major city, comparable to Mediolanum, strategically positioned at the plains' edge of the Via Claudia Augusta, following the Adige to the Brenner Pass and Raetia. These factors influenced the amphitheatre's size, accounting for Verona's substantial population, its countryside, and likely nearby centers such as Vicetia and Brixia, which lacked amphitheatres. Future demographic growth was also considered, as building such a costly structure required avoiding the need for a second venue (as in Pozzuoli) or expansion (as in Pula) due to miscalculation.

Recent estimates for summer performances put the arena's capacity at 22,000, though the stage occupies about a third of the seats, and the upper portico is gone. Thus, in Roman times, it likely held around 30,000 spectators.

== Legends ==
Over time, legends have emerged about the Arena’s origins. In the Middle Ages, one story claims that a Veronese nobleman, condemned to death for a heinous crime, promised the city’s leaders he would build a vast edifice overnight to house all citizens and host spectacles, bargaining his soul with the devil to complete it between the evening and morning Hail Marys.

That night, all the devils of Hell converged on Verona, but the nobleman repented, praying to the Holy Virgin, who granted a miracle: the sun came up two hours earlier. In the morning, at the first note of the Hail Mary, the demons all sank back into the ground, leaving the building, though well underway, incomplete: this is said to be the origin of the Ala.

Other medieval legends attributed its construction to the Devil because of its immense size, considered impossible to build using human hands. Additional tales credited King Theodoric, likely because he restored it and held numerous spectacles there.

== See also ==
- Arena di Verona Festival

== Filmography ==
- Verona Romana - Oltre il tempo, directed by Marcello Peres and Nicola Tagliabue (2015)

== Bibliography ==
- Buchi, Ezio; Cavalieri Manasse, Giuliana (1987). Il Veneto nell'età romana: Note di urbanistica e di archeologia del territorio [The Veneto in the Roman Age: Notes on Urban Planning and Territorial Archaeology] (in Italian). Vol. II. Verona: Banca Popolare di Verona.
- Carrara, Mario (1966). Gli Scaligeri [The Scaligeri] (in Italian). Milan: Dall'Oglio.
- Castiglioni, Giovanni; Cofani, Marco (2017). "L'Anfiteatro Arena: una questione da architetti" [The Arena Amphitheater: A Matter for Architects]. ArchitettiVerona (in Italian). 02 (109). Verona: Ordine degli Architetti Pianificatori Paesaggisti e Conservatori della provincia di Verona: 20–25.
- Cavalieri Manasse, Giuliana; Hudson, Peter John (1999). "Nuovi dati sulle fortificazioni di Verona (III-XI secolo)" [New Data on the Fortifications of Verona (3rd-11th Century)] (PDF). Le Fortificazioni del Garda e I Sistemi di Difesa dell'Italia Settentrionale Tra Tardo Antico e Alto Medioevo (in Italian). Mantua: S.A.P.: 71–91. Archived from the original (PDF) on 30 June 2020.
- Coarelli, Filippo; Franzoni, Lanfranco (1972). Arena di Verona: venti secoli di storia [Arena of Verona: Twenty Centuries of History] (in Italian). Verona: Ente autonomo Arena di Verona.
- Corbetta, Silvia, ed. (2013). 1913-2013: Arena di Verona [1913-2013: Arena of Verona] (in Italian). Verona: Cariverona.
- Ederle, Guglielmo (1965). Dizionario cronologico bio-bibliografico dei vescovi di Verona: cenni sulla chiesa veronese [Chronological Bio-Bibliographical Dictionary of the Bishops of Verona: Notes on the Veronese Church] (in Italian). Verona: Edizioni di Vita veronese.
- Lenotti, Tullio (1954a). La Bra [The Bra] (in Italian). Verona: Edizioni di Vita Veronese.

Preceded by Beijing National Stadium; Beijing	Winter Olympics; Closing Ceremony; 2026	Succeeded by TBC; French Alps
