= Arena di Verona Festival =

Italian opera festival

Inside of Verona Arena with scenery for an opera performance, summer 1994

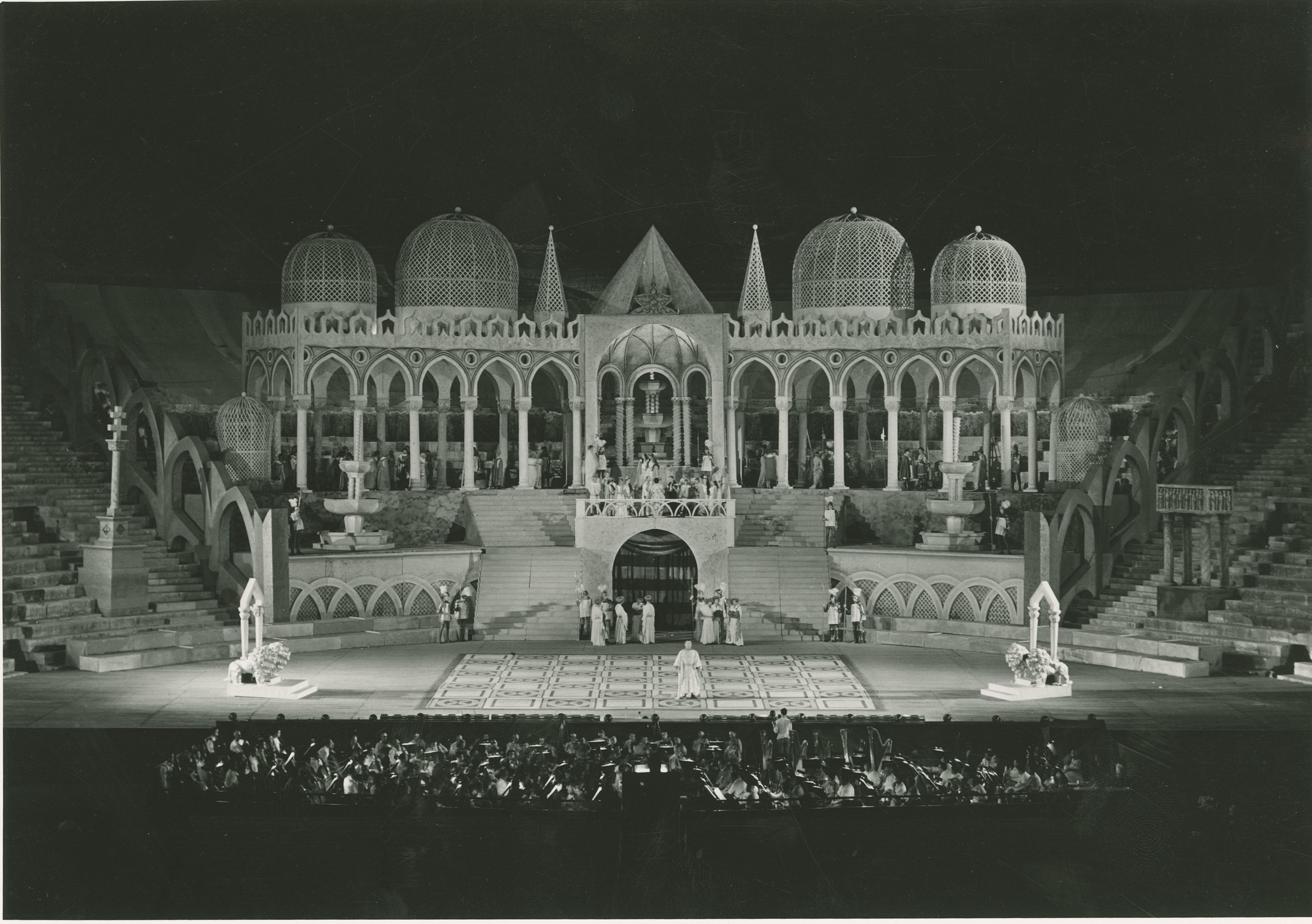
La Favorita performance in 1958

Arena di Verona Festival (Verona Arena Festival) is a summer festival of opera, located in the city of Verona, Italy. Since 1936, it has been organized under the auspices of an official body, first the Ente Autonomo Spettacoli Lirici Arena di Verona, (Autonomous organization for lyrical productions of the Arena di Verona), and then, following legislation in 1996 and 1998, the Ente Lirico Arena di Verona was transformed into a private foundation, the present-day Arena di Verona Foundation.

Opera performances are given in Arena di Verona, an ancient Roman amphitheatre, which was capable of holding 30,000 spectators. Performances traditionally begin at dusk and spectators on the stone seats of the arena bring small candles (the "moccoletto"), which are lit as darkness falls and the performances begin.

== First opera productions ==
The first operas were performed in 1913 in celebration of the centenary of the birth of Giuseppe Verdi and were produced by the tenor Giovanni Zenatello and the theatre impresario Ottone Rovato. Their staging of Aida in the biggest open-air lyrical theatre in the world began a long tradition. In the following year Zenatello and others returned and, in the years before 1936, a variety of organizations took over the presentations. These included the Lyrica Italica Ars from 1919 to 1920, the Casa Musicale Sonzogno of Milan from 1921 to 1922, and the impresario Gino Bertolaso from 1923 to 1926, while, in 1934 another organization, the Ente Comunale degli Spettacoli (the municipal performance association) took over the summer festival. Finally, in 1936, a permanent organization was created.

== Significant artistic achievements ==
Many singers made their names and careers by performing at Verona. In 1929 Beniamino Gigli thrilled audiences with his appearances in Flotow's Martha. Between 1947 and 1954 Maria Callas was a regular after creating a sensation in Ponchielli's La Gioconda.

In addition to singers, directors and designers added distinguishing elements to productions such as the 1953 water pool created for Aida by silent cinema director Georg Wilhelm Pabst. His aim was to conjure up the image of the Nile on which little Egyptian boats could sail, and the idea was adapted by Pier Luigi Pizzi again in Aida in 1999. Also, it was Pabst who was responsible for the introduction of a great number of animals on stage, including elephants, horses and dromedaries, and this form of spectacle has become a prominent feature of many opera productions in Verona.

Dance and classic concert performances have also been given in the Arena. Classical ballets and traditional dances from all over the world have been seen. In 1976, Maurice Béjart brought the Ballet du XXe Siècle from La Monnaie in Brussels and choreographed Beethoven's Ninth Symphony. This première was interrupted by rain, but the performance continued to a cassette tape of the music and without the orchestra.

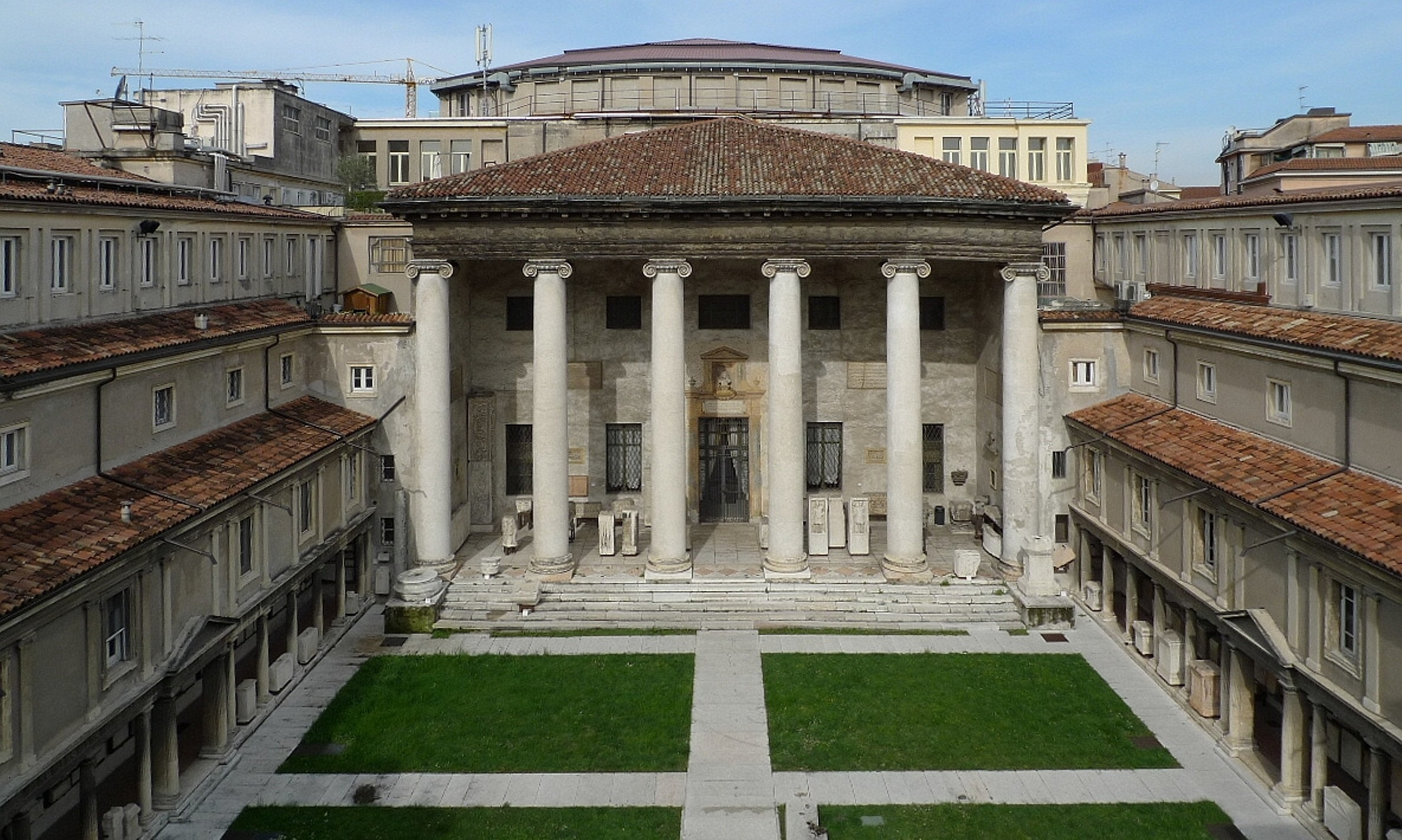
Exterior of Teatro Filarmonico

== Teatro Filarmonico ==
Since 1976, the organization has expanded its artistic activities from October of one year to May of the following year in the rebuilt Teatro Filarmonico, a theatre which had been destroyed in World War II. With this new addition, the organization could accumulate a permanent collection of artists (the orchestra, the choir and the corps de ballet) and technicians who represent the productions that are staged in Verona and transported nationally and internationally.

== See also ==
- List of opera festivals
