= Giovanni Battista Amigazzi =

Italian painter

Giovanni Battista Amigazzi (mid-17th century) was an Italian painter, born and died in Verona. He was a pupil of Carlo Ridolfi. He is mainly known as a copyist and portraitist. He also had a painting in San Procolo, Verona.

He frescoed some lunettes in the Chapel of the Madonna of the church of San Francesco di Paola, Verona, and some lunettes in the choir in the Church of the Misericordia.
