= San Procolo, Verona =

Church building in Verona, Italy

Coordinates: 45.442°N 10.979°E

San Procolo is a Paleo-Christian, Roman Catholic small temple standing adjacent to the Basilica di San Zeno in central Verona, region of Veneto, Italy.

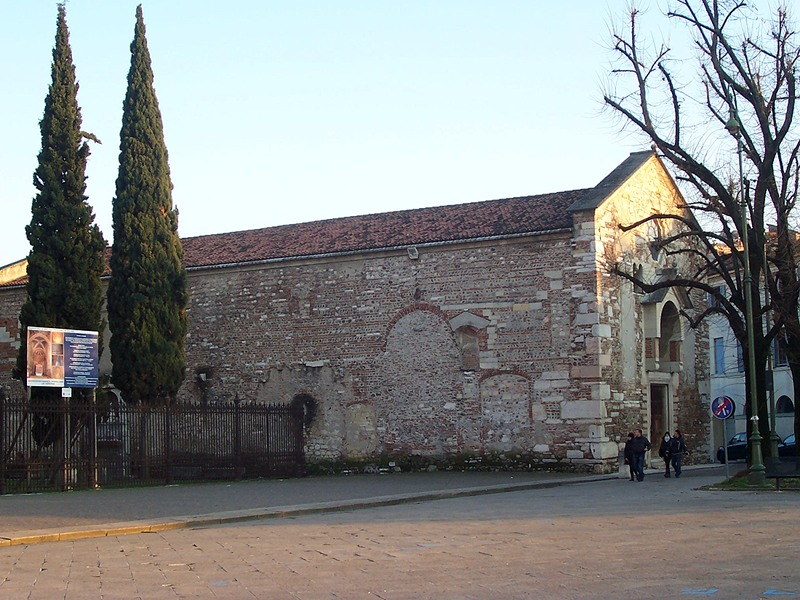
Church of San Procolo

== History ==
A chapel or temple at this site was built at the site of an Ancient Roman cemetery from the 5th or 6th century, putatively above the tomb of Saint Proculus (Italian: San Procolo) (310-330), the fourth bishop of Verona. There are documents citing the church from the 9th century, and authors that note the church was burnt during a Hungarian invasion in 924. It soon came under the jurisdiction of the abbot of the adjacent Monastery of San Zeno. It is noted in ancient sources that the bodies of Saints Euprepio (1st bishop), Cricino (2nd bishop), and Agabio or Agapito (3rd bishop of Verona) were also buried in the crypt. Perhaps even the martyrs Cosmo and Damiano were believed to have been buried here.

The structures we see today are the result of exterior reconstructions in the 12th century after the 1117 Verona earthquake, and interior reconstructions in the 16th century. Inside the church a staircase leads to the ancient crypt.

The interior has housed paintings a frescoes from various centuries, among those noted in an inventory from 1750: atop the organ in the main chapel was a painting of St Proculus with Angel by Giovanni Antonio Galli (Lo Spadarino). He also painted frescoes for the Chapel of the Virgin, which also held a Nativity by Bernardo Muttoni and a Resurrection by Giacomo Locatelli and a God the Father by Giovanni Battista Amigazzi. A Second chapel had a canvas of Saints Sebstian and Roch by Giovanni Battista Canziani, and an Annunciation by Pietro Paolo Carpi. Over the main door was a Last Supper by Giovanni Battista Lanzani. In the Oratory are depictions of the Apostles Phillip and Jacob by Giambettino Cignaroli.

The interior contains a Last Supper and St. Blaise healing the Sick by Giorgio Anselmi, and a work by Antonio Badile.
