= Proculus of Verona =

Bishop of Verona

Saint Proculus
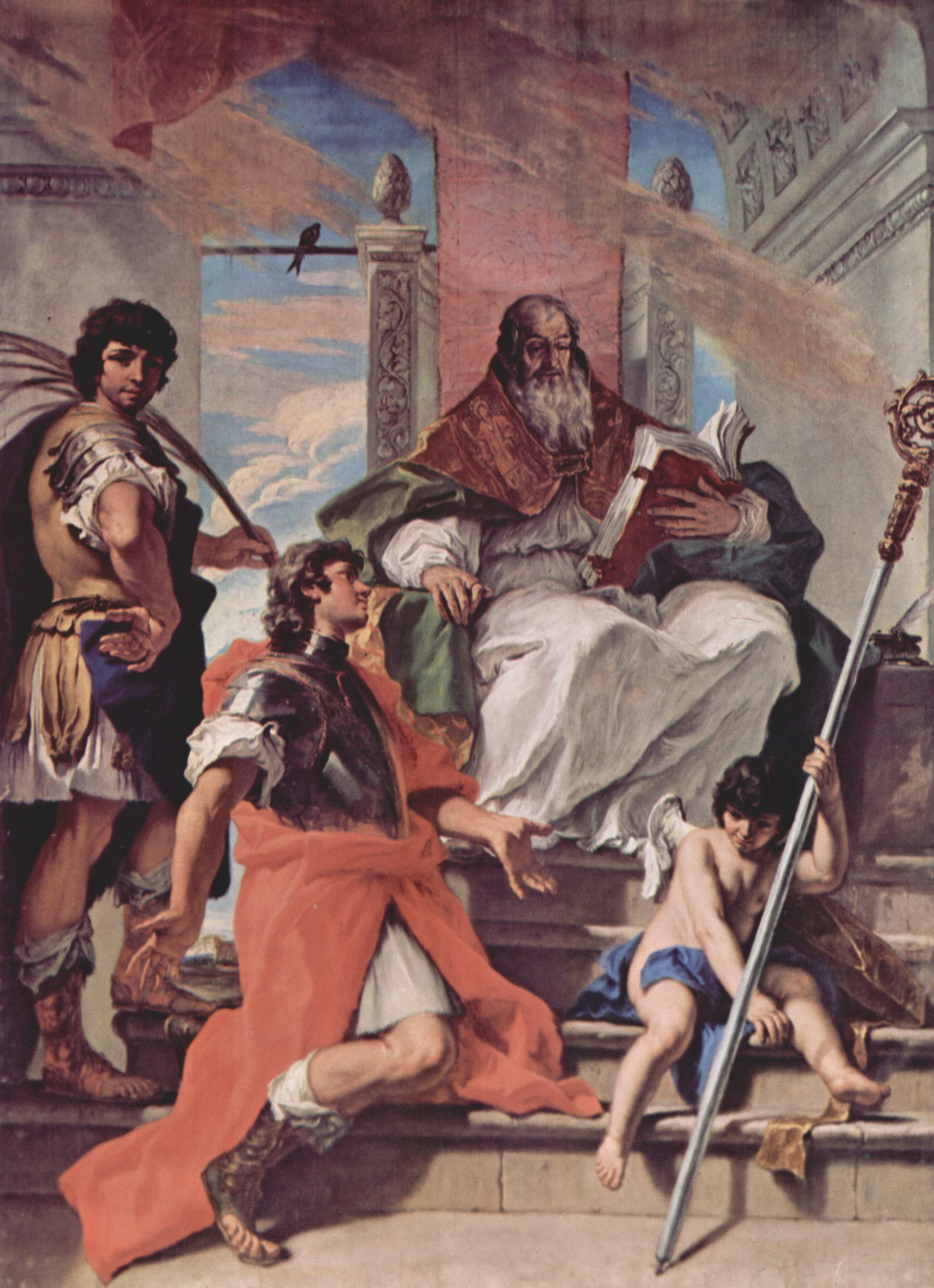
- Saints Firmus and Rusticus of Verona with an angel, by Sebastiano Ricci. Saint Proculus is seated.

Bishop
- Died: ~320 AD
- Venerated in: Roman Catholic Church; Eastern Orthodox Church
- Major shrine: Chapel of San Procolo, Basilica di San Zeno
- Feast: December 9

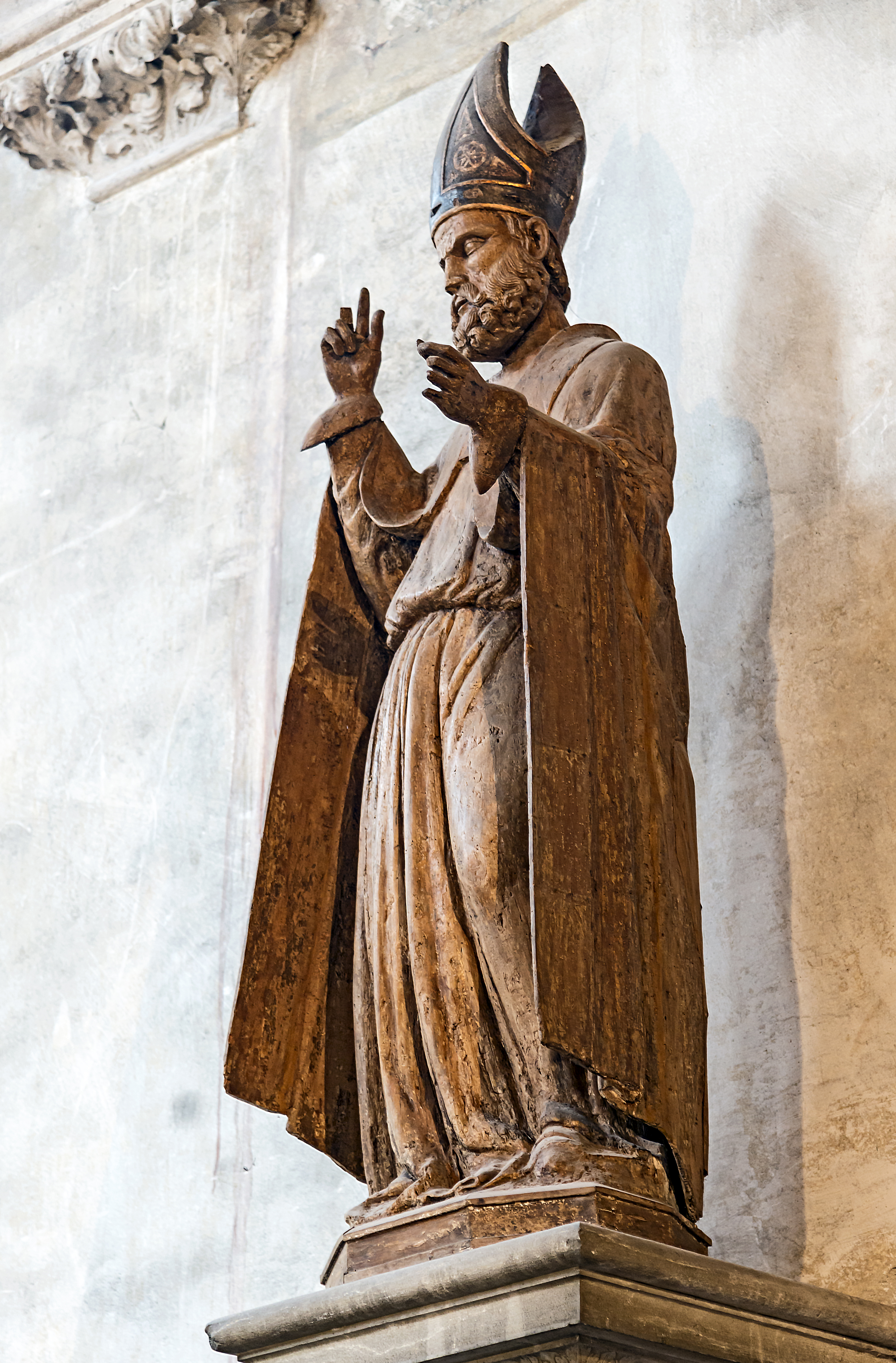
Saint Proculus in San Zaccaria, 1451

Saint Proculus (Italian: San Procolo) (died c. 320 AD) was a bishop of Verona who survived the persecutions of Diocletian. He died of natural causes at Verona. He is commemorated on December 9.

== Traditional narrative ==
During the Diocleian persecution, Proculus, bishop of Verona went to the prison to encourage Firmus and Rusticus. He was bound and brought with them before Anulinus, the consul. However, as Proculus was elderly, Anulinus did not consider him worth his interest, and had him released, beaten, and banished from the city. He lived to survive the persecutions.

He is said to have afterwards visited Jerusalem; to have been taken prisoner and sold as a slave on his return; but to have regained his liberty and returned to Verona.

== Veneration ==
Attached to the Basilica di San Zeno in Verona is the Church of San Procolo housing the relics of Saint Proculus. It dates from the 6th or 7th century, being erected in the Christian necropolis across the Via Gallica. It is first mentioned, however, only in 845. His relics were discovered in 1492 during renovations of the church.

In San Zaccaria in Venice is a life-size wooden statue "Proculus of Verona" (1451). His head is venerated in Bergamo. In 1704, Sebastiano Ricci executed in Venice a canvas of "San Procolo" for Bergamo Cathedral.

== See also ==
- Diocese of Verona
