= Firmus and Rusticus =

Martyrs of Verona

Saints Firmus and Rusticus
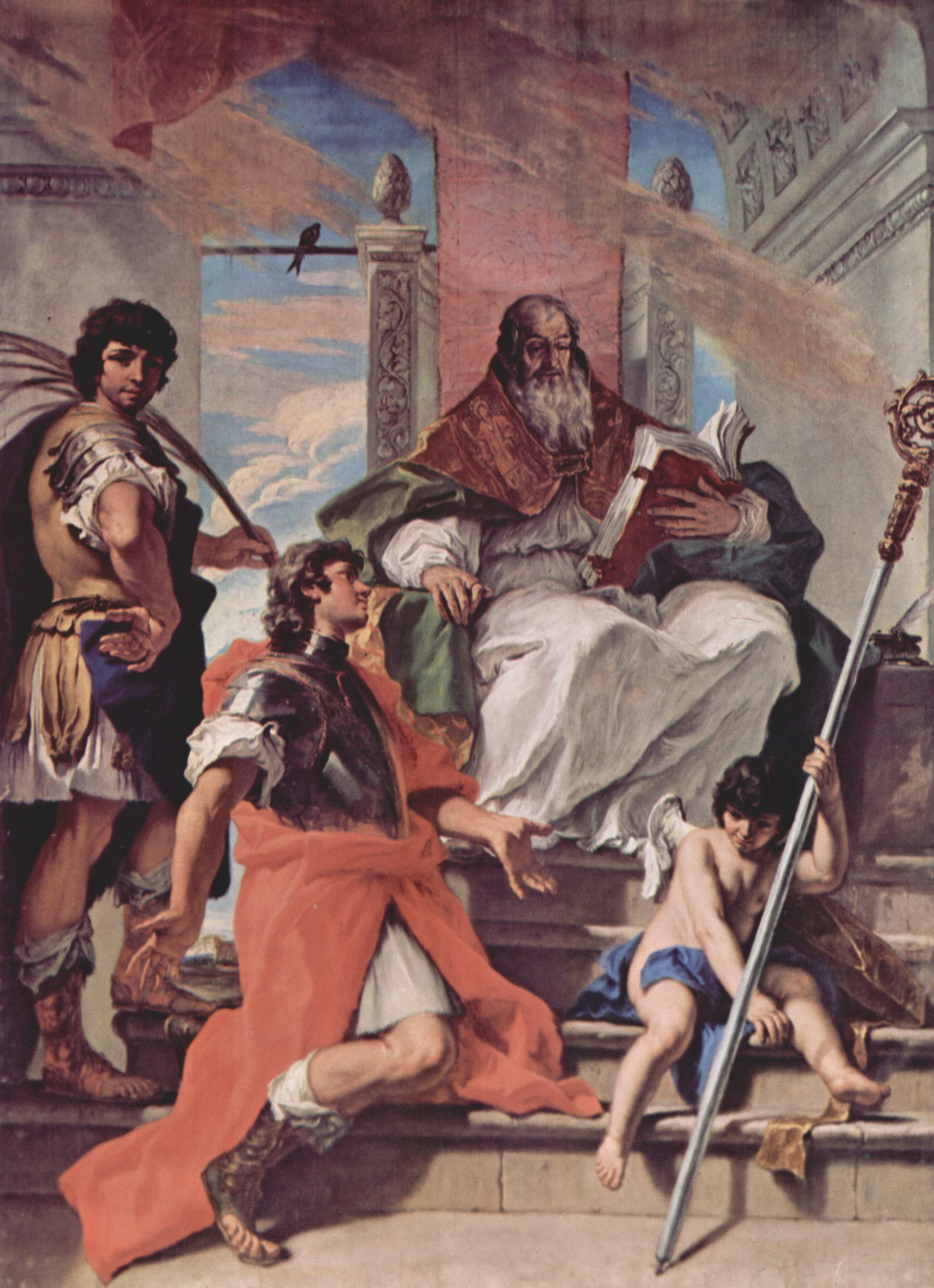
- Saints Firmus and Rusticus of Verona with an angel, by Sebastiano Ricci. Saint Proculus is seated.

Martyrs
- Born: Bergamo, Italy
- Died: c. 290; Verona, Italy
- Venerated in: Roman Catholic Church; Eastern Orthodox Church
- Feast: 9 August

Saints Firmus and Rusticus (Italian: San Fermo e San Rustico) (died c. 290 AD) are venerated as two martyrs of Verona.

== Legend ==
Their unreliable Acts state that Firmus and Rusticus, kinsmen, were prominent citizens of Bergamo. According to tradition, the soldier Firmus was captured for the sake of his faith and brought to Milan. On the way, his relative Rusticus, who greeted him, was also taken and led to Milan. They were martyred at Verona under the Emperor Maximian after refusing to sacrifice to pagan idols. Under the judge Anolinus, they were tortured, beaten with clubs, and beheaded.

== Veneration ==
The veneration of Firmus and Rusticus is documented around 800 near the Classe in Ravenna. They are mentioned in the Versus de Verona.

The Church of San Fermo Maggiore, Verona has 24 tiles by the Italian artist Luciano Minguzzi depicting the torture and killing of Saint Fermo and Saint Rustico - notably the killing of Saint Rustico with a herringbone. The presbytery hosts relics of the saints.

It has been postulated that Firmus and Rusticus were actually two martyrs of Africa whose relics were translated to Verona. Their Acts were written to make them heroes of Verona instead. Baring-Gould notes that Anolinus was consul in 295 and pro-consul in Africa in 303. In 765, the relics of the martyrs were brought to Verona from Trieste by the sister of Bishop Anno. There is nothing linking Firmus and Rusticus with Verona before the second half of the eighth century. A tenth century account says that the relics of Firmus and Rusticus had first been taken to Africa, then to Capodistria and finally to Trieste, before bishop Anno had them re-buried them in a lead coffer within the high altar.

Their cult was approved in 1734; their feast day is August 9.

== Gallery ==
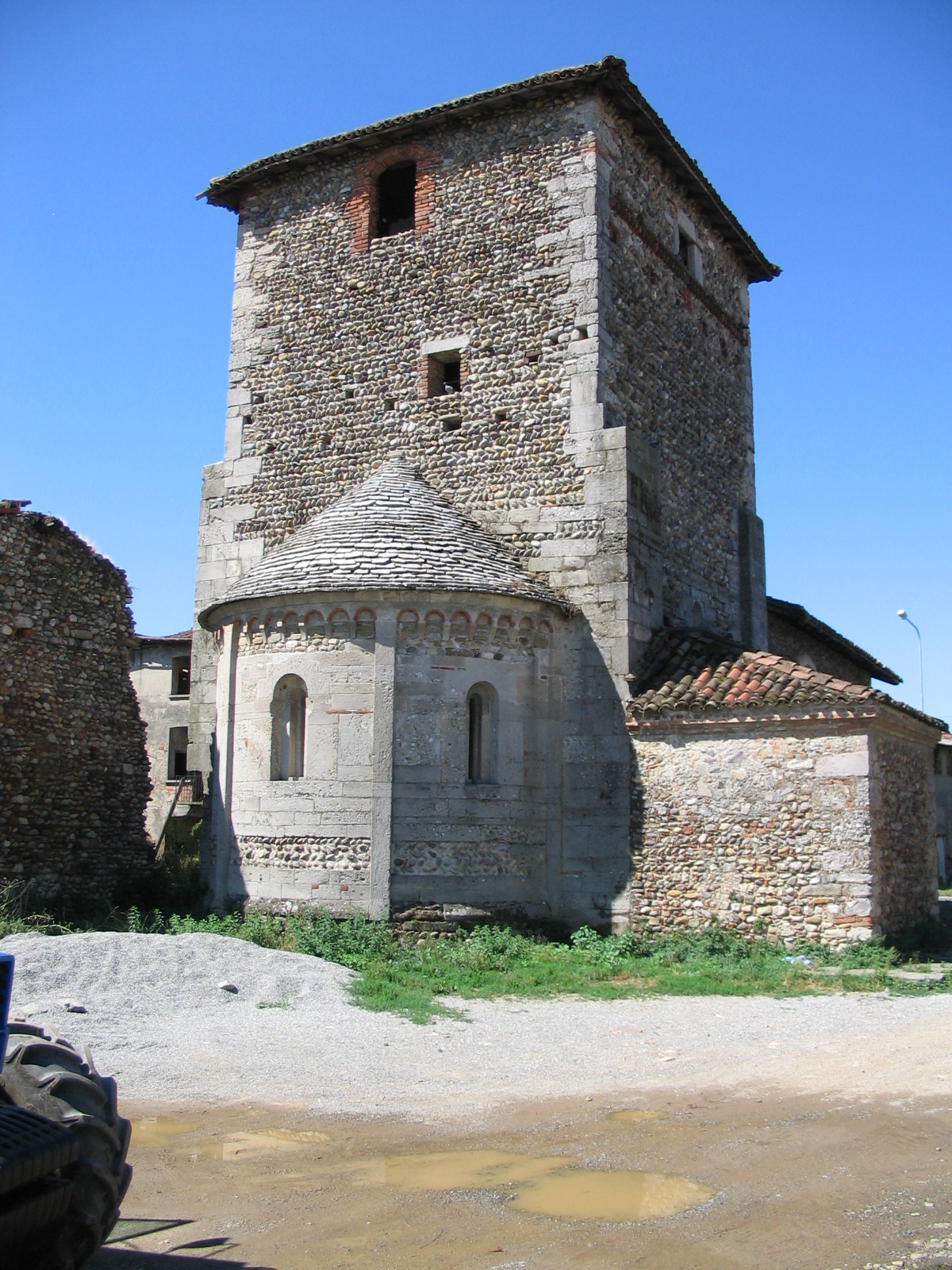
Church of San Fermo e Rustico, Brignano Gera d'Adda. 12th century

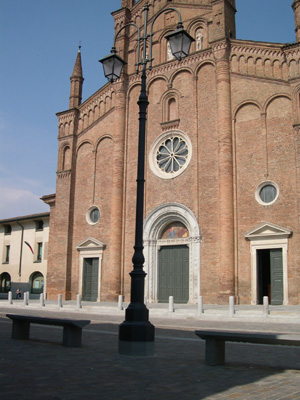
Parish church of Caravaggio, Lombardy, dedicated to Firmus and Rusticus

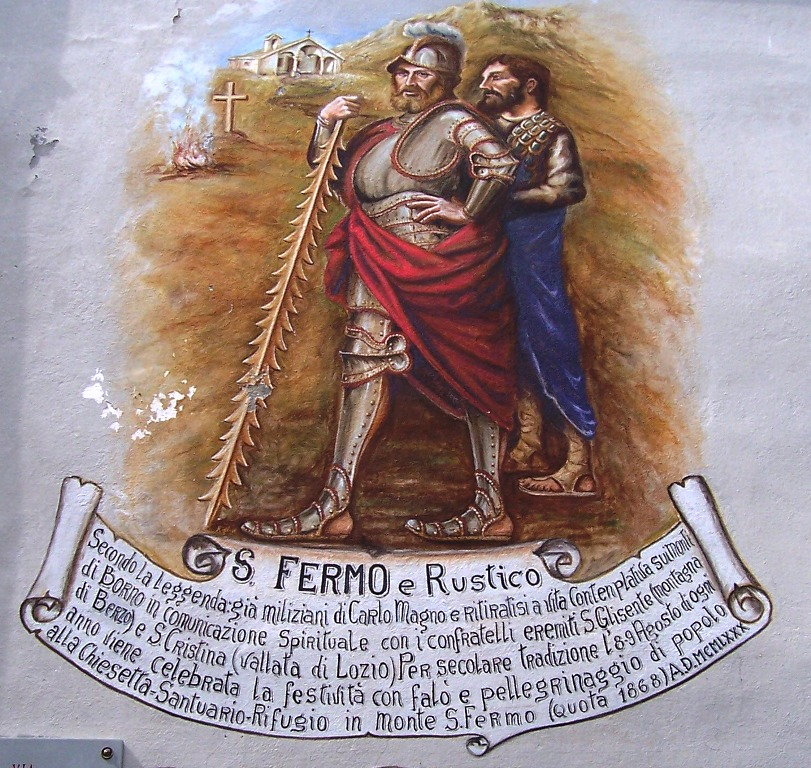
Fresco about Saints Firmus and Rusticus in Val Camonica
