= 1725 in art =

Events from the year 1725 in art.

== Events ==
- January 20 – The Academy of Fine Arts Vienna is refounded by Charles VI, Holy Roman Emperor, as the k.k. Hofakademie der Maler, Bildhauer und Baukunst, under the direction of the French-born court painter Jacob van Schuppen.
- A number of artists including Juan Vicente Ribera are appointed by the Council of Castile to develop a tax structure for artworks

== Paintings ==
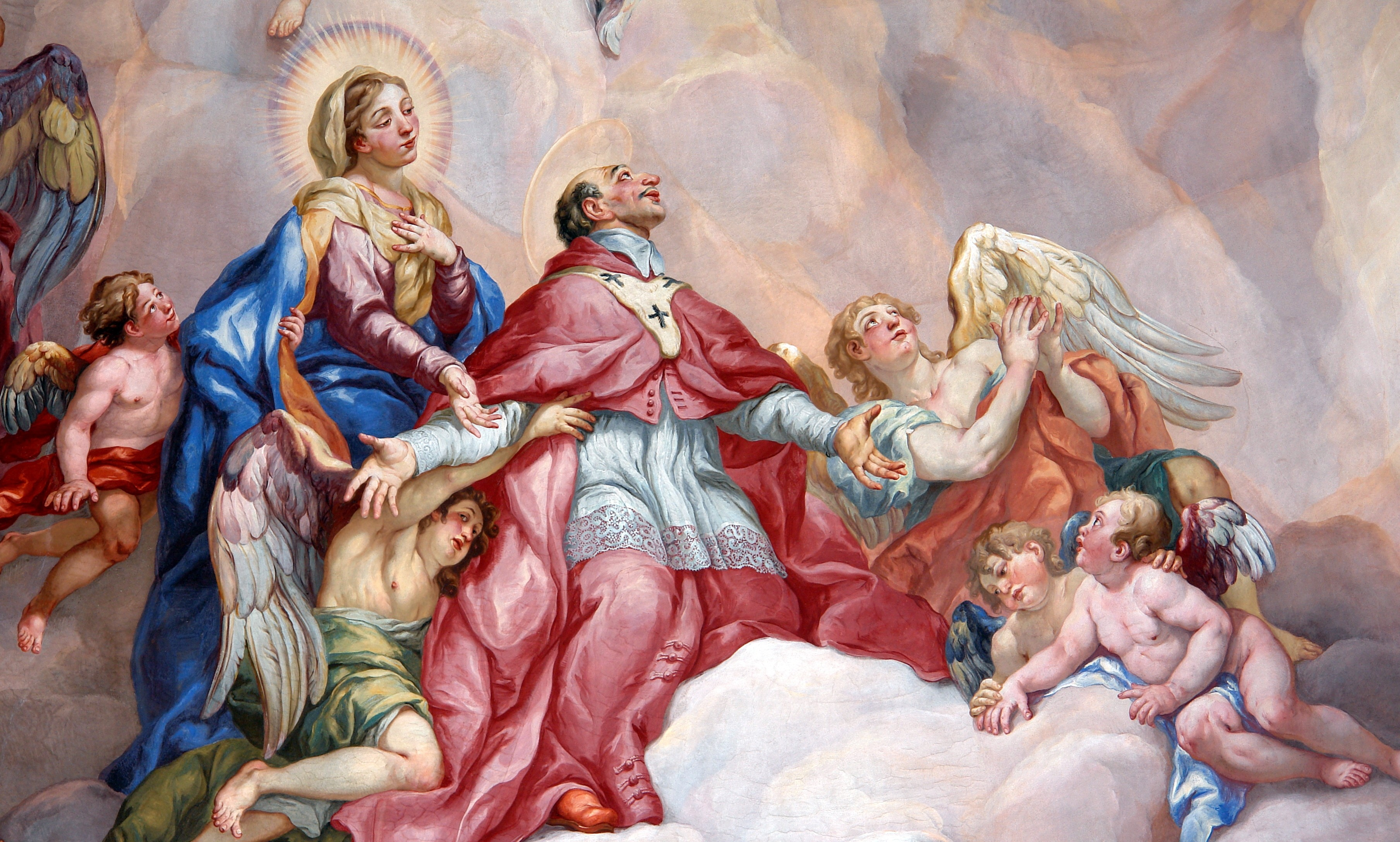
Rottmayr – Intercession of Charles Borromeo supported by the Virgin Mary

- Canaletto
  - Doge's Palace
  - Entrance to the Grand Canal: Looking East
  - The Grand Canal from Rialto toward the North
  - The Grand Canal near the Ponte di Rialto
  - The Grand Canal with the Rialto Bridge in the Background
  - Rio dei Mendicanti: Looking South
  - Santi Giovanni e Paolo and the Scuola di San Marco
- Jean-Baptiste-Siméon Chardin – The Skate
- Philippe Mercier – The Schutz Family and Their Friends on a Terrace
- Sebastiano Ricci – Apotheosis of Saint Sebastian (approximate date)
- Jacob de Wit – Hercules on Mount Olympus (ceiling painting now at Waddesdon Manor, England)
- Johann Michael Rottmayr – Dome fresco, Karlskirche, Vienna
- Francesco Solimena - The Expulsion of Heliodorus from the Temple (circa)

== Births ==
- January 16 – Johann Anton de Peters, German painter and etcher (died 1795)
- February 17 – Joseph Ignatz Sadler, Czech fresco painter (died 1767)
- May 16 – Peder Als, Danish historical and portrait painter (died 1775)
- June 3 – Christoph Friedrich Reinhold Lisiewski, German portrait painter (died 1794)
- July 1 – Rhoda Delaval, English portrait painter (died 1757)
- August 21 – Jean-Baptiste Greuze, French painter (died 1805)
- September 7 – William Duesbury, English enameller and entrepreneur (died 1786)
- September 25 – Francesco Bartolozzi, Italian engraver (died 1815)
- October 7 (bapt.) – Francis Swaine, English marine painter (died 1782)
- November 22 – Ignaz Günther, German sculptor and woodcarver within the Bavarian rococo tradition (died 1775)
- date unknown
  - Guillaume Philippe Benoist, French line engraver (died 1770)
  - Giuseppe Canale, Italian painter and engraver (died 1802)
  - Domenico Cunego, Italian printmaker (died 1803)
  - James Gabriel Huquier, French portrait painter and engraver (died 1805)
  - Therese Maron, German painter active in Rome (died 1806)
  - Nicola Peccheneda, Italian painter (died 1804)
  - Antonio Ponz, Spanish painter (died 1792)
  - Juan Ramírez de Arellano, Spanish Baroque painter (died 1782)

== Deaths ==
- February 5 – Christoph Weigel the Elder, German engraver and art dealer (born 1654)
- March 2 – José Benito de Churriguera, Spanish architect and sculptor (born 1665)
- April 18 – Antonio Calza, Italian painter of historical and battle-scenes (born 1658)
- May 6 – Bernardo Schiaffino, Italian sculptor (born 1678)
- May 23 – Anna Maria Schmilau, Swedish tapestry artist
- September 2 – Charles-François Poerson, French painter (born 1653)
- September 11 – Giuseppe Gambarini, Italian painter of frescoes (born 1680)
- October – José de Mora, Spanish sculptor (born 1642)
- date unknown
  - Gioseffo Maria Bartolini, Italian painter (born 1657)
  - Giovanni Girolamo Bonesi, Italian painter (born 1653)
  - Bernard Lens II, English engraver, pioneer of mezzotint technique and publisher (born 1659)
- probable – Jan Soukens, Dutch Golden Age painter (born c.1650)
