= Cavazza =

Cavazza or Cavassa may refer to:

- Casa Cavassa, a Renaissance-style palazzo in Saluzzo, Piedmont, Italy, and the site of the city's museum, the Museo Civico Casa Cavassa

== Persons ==
- Claudio Cavazza (1934–2011), Italian entrepreneur
- Elisabeth Cavazza (1849–1926), American author, journalist, music critic
- Giovanni Battista Cavazza, Italian painter and engraver
- Maria de Francesca-Cavazza, German operatic soprano
- Pier Francesco Cavazza (1675–1755), Italian painter and art collector
- Sandro Cavazza (born 1992), Swedish singer and songwriter
- Sebastian Cavazza (born 1973), Slovenian actor

== See also ==
- Giorgio Cavazzano (born 1947), Italian cartoonist
- Cassava, a woody shrub native to South America of the spurge family, Euphorbiaceae
