= Santa Maria di Chiavica, Verona =

Church in Verona, Italy

Coordinates: 45°26′39.2″N 10°59′59.1″E

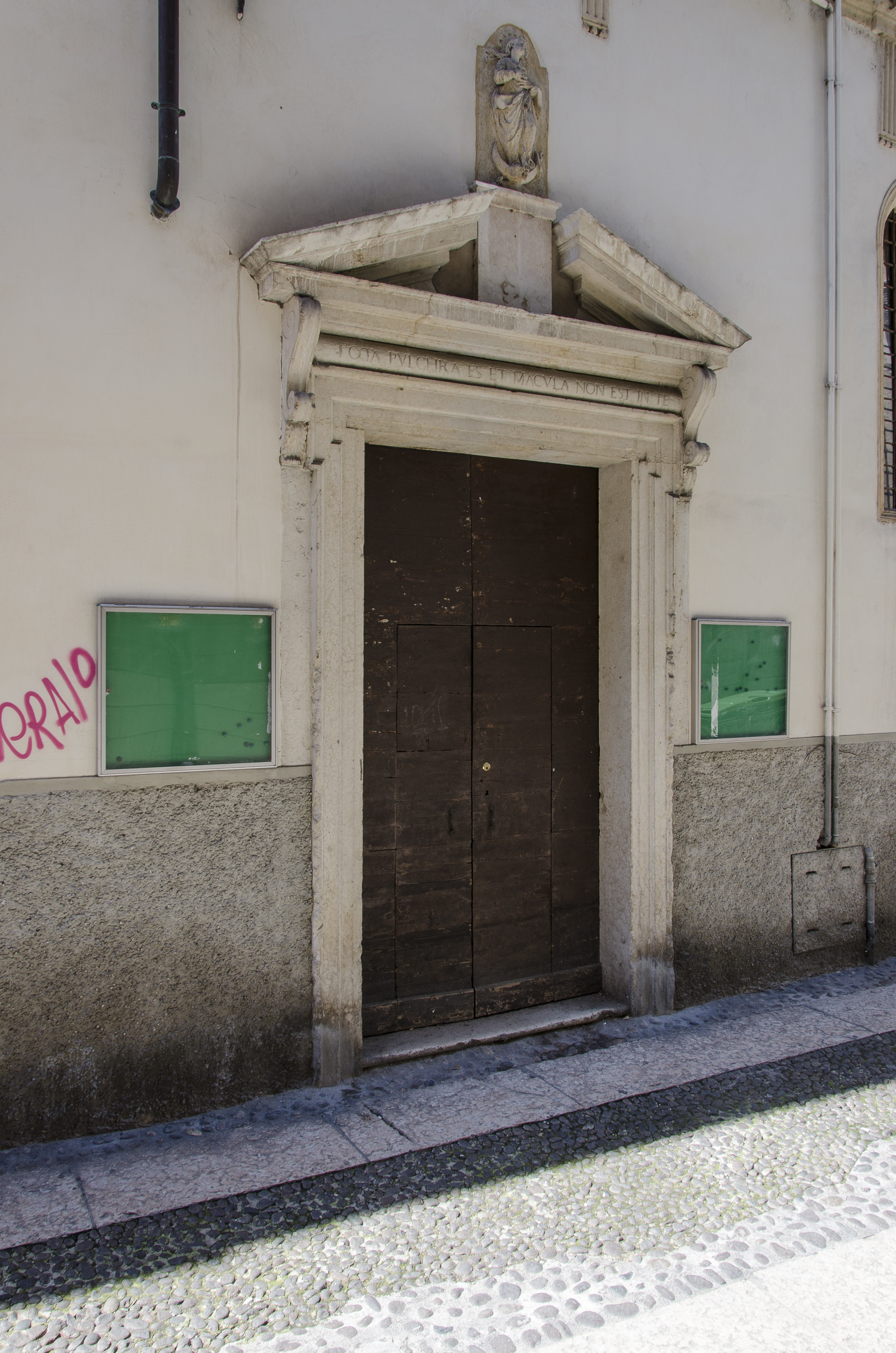
Entrance portal of the church of Santa Maria in Chiavica

Santa Maria in Chiavica is a former Roman Catholic church, now deconsecrated, in the Renaissance style, located on Via S. Maria in Chiavica number 7 in central Verona, region of Veneto, Italy. The building retains portions of its original Romanesque structure and original fresco and altar decoration, but is now used for theatrical and musical performances.

== History ==
An oratory at the site is said to have been founded in 813 by the Archdeacon Pacifico; but the earliest documents date to the 12th century. By the 16th century, it was affiliated with the church of Sant'Anastasia.

Among the remaining artwork are a Birth of the Virgin and a Nativity of Jesus by Giovanni Battista Lanceni. In the second chapel is a St Francis de Sales and St John Nepomuk by Michelangiola Lanzeni. The frescoes are by Girolamo Costantini. There are also altarpieces by Eduardo Perini, Paolo Farinati, Pasquale Ottino, Giovanni Francesco Caroto, Michelangelo Aliprandi, and Francesco Turchi.
