= Nicola Peccheneda =

Italian painter

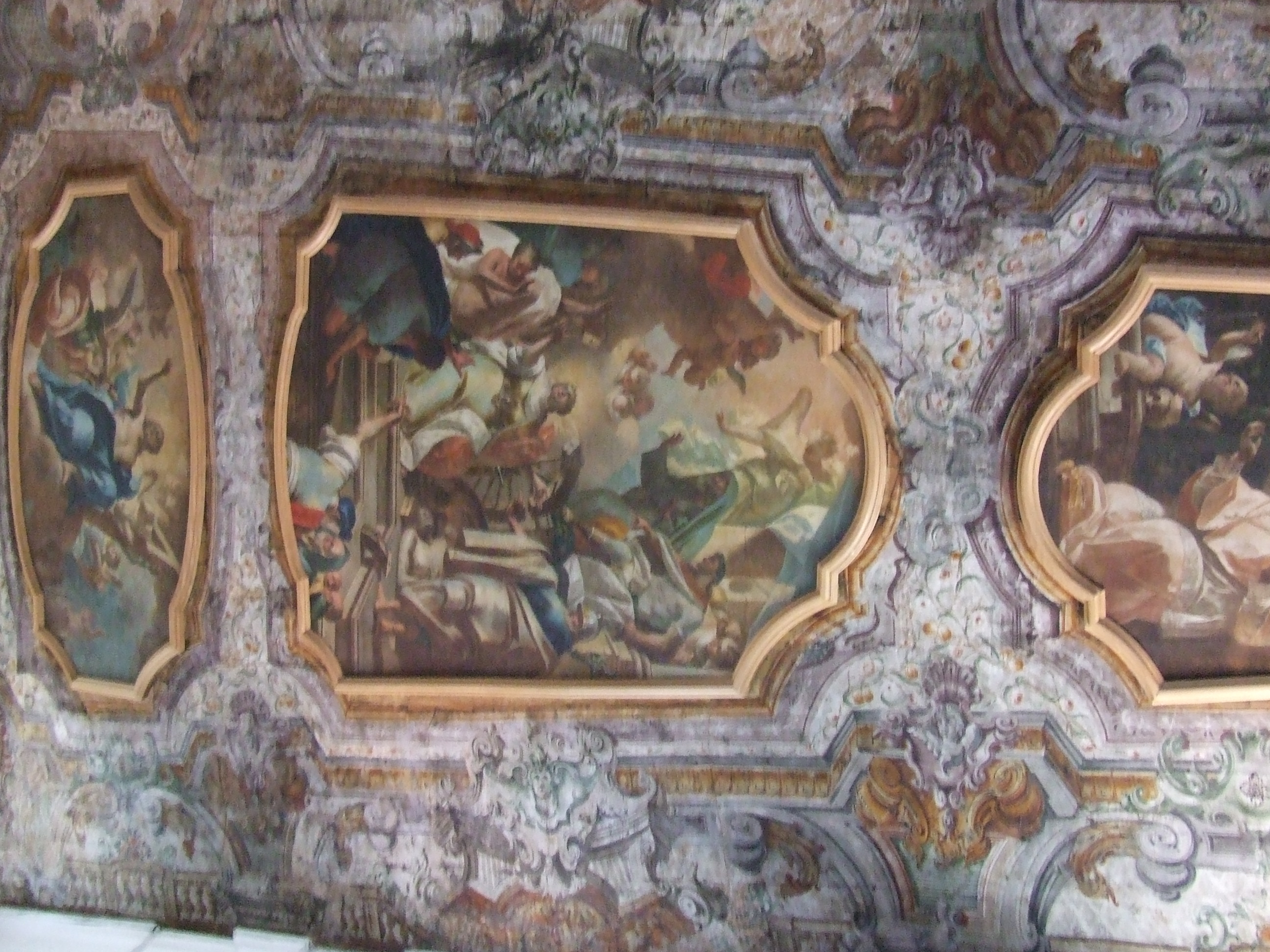
Paintings from the Church of Santa Caterina di Caggiano

Nicola Peccheneda (1725 – 4 November 1804) was an Italian painter of Campania and Basilicata in the second half of the 18th century. He was born in Polla, and initially trained in Naples, probably in the studio of Francesco de Mura. He adopted the reigning style of Francesco Solimena. While he came from a family including professionals (his brother was a lawyer and judge in Naples), he moved back to his native Polla and made his career there.

== Works ==
A work from 1756 depicting San Donato da Ripacandida was destined to the convent of San Francisco of Auletta. He decorated of the churches of Santa Maria of the Greeks and Santa Caterina in Caggiano, and the church of Santa Maria Maggiore in Sant' Arsenio, the Cathedral of Melfi, the church of the Annunziata in Marcianise. He was prolific and his paintings can be found in Altavilla Silentina, Atena Lucana, Buccino, Giffoni Valle Piana, Padula, Petina, Polla, Romagnano al Monte, Sassano, Teggiano and Vibonati in Campania, as well as Brienza, Brindisi Montagna, Cirigliano, Maratea, and Marsico Nuovo in Basilicata. He was elected mayor of Polla.
