= Canziani =

Canziani is an Italian surname. Notable people with the surname include:

- Estella Canziani (1887–1964), British painter, interior decorator, writer and folklorist
- Giovanni Battista Canziani (1664–1730), Italian Baroque painter
- Héctor Canziani, Argentine poet, screenwriter and film director
