= Polla, Campania =

Polla
- Comune
- Comune di Polla
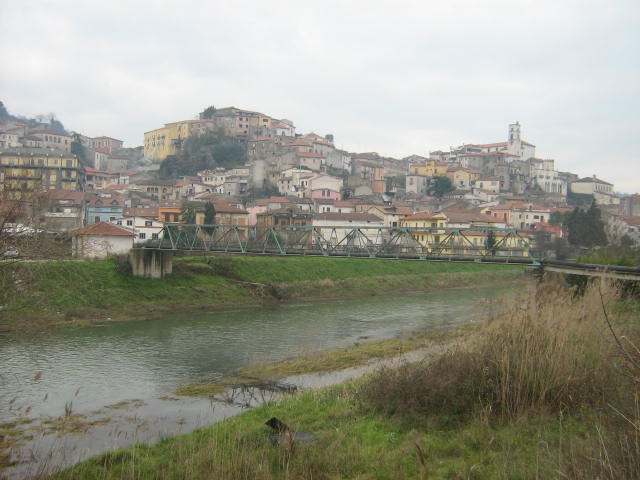
- View of Polla from Tanagro river shore

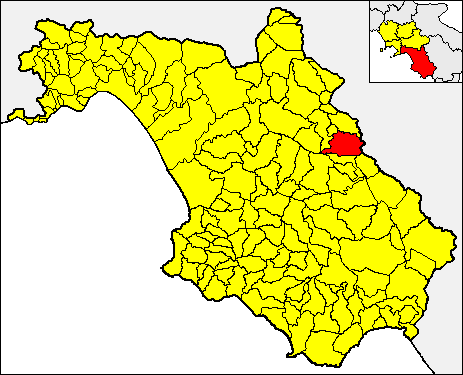
- Polla within the province of Salerno and Campania

- Location within Italy Location within Campania
- Coordinates: 40°31′N 15°30′E
- Country: Italy
- Region: Campania
- Province: Salerno (SA)

Government
  - Mayor: Massimo Loviso

Area
  - Total: 47 km^{2} (18 sq mi)
- Elevation: 468 m (1,535 ft)

Population (31 December 2011)
  - Total: 5,327
  - Density: 110/km^{2} (290/sq mi)
- Demonym: Pollesi
- Time zone: UTC+1 (CET)
  - Summer (DST): UTC+2 (CEST)
- Postal code: 84035
- Dialing code: 0975
- Patron saint: St. Nicholas
- Saint day: 6 December
- Website: Official website

Polla is a town and comune of the province of Salerno in the Campania region of south-west Italy. In 2011 its population was 5,327.

== History ==
The area where the town is located has been settled since prehistoric times, as evidenced by finds of bones and ceramic in a nearby cave. During the Ancient Roman era, a forum was built in what is now the quarter of San Pietro.

== Geography ==
Polla is in the north of the Vallo di Diano, close to the Alburni mountain range and is crossed by the Tanagro river. It borders with the municipalities of Atena Lucana, Auletta, Brienza (PZ), Caggiano, Corleto Monforte, Pertosa, Sant'Angelo Le Fratte (PZ) and Sant'Arsenio.

== Famous residents ==
- Costantino Catena (b. 1969), pianist
- Edoardo Monteforte (b. 1849), painter
- Nicola Peccheneda (1725-1804), Rococo painter

== Twin towns ==
- Steinenbronn (Germany)

== See also ==
- Vallo di Diano
- Cilento
- Pertosa Caves
- Cilentan dialect
