= Sant'Angelo Le Fratte =

- Comune
- Comune di Sant'Angelo Le Fratte
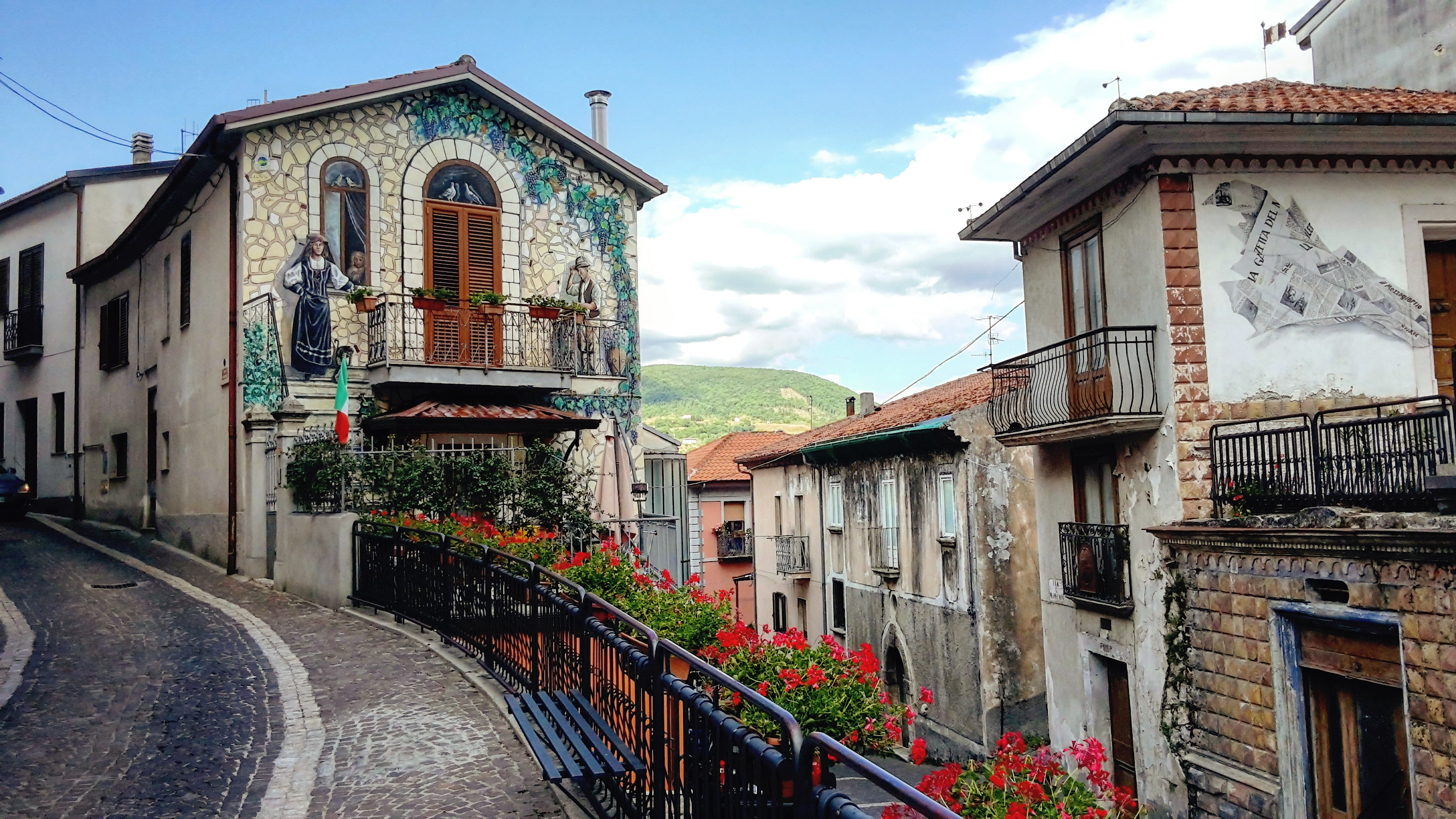
- View of Sant'Angelo Le Fratte

- Sant'Angelo Le Fratte within the Province of Potenza

- Location within Italy Location within Basilicata
- Coordinates: 40°32′49″N 15°33′27″E
- Country: Italy
- Region: Basilicata
- Province: Potenza (PZ)
- Frazioni: Farisi, Isca, Santa Maria Fellana, San Vito

Area
  - Total: 23 km^{2} (8.9 sq mi)
- Elevation: 560 m (1,840 ft)

Population (2011)
  - Total: 1,457
  - Density: 63/km^{2} (160/sq mi)
- Demonym: Santangiolesi
- Time zone: UTC+1 (CET)
  - Summer (DST): UTC+2 (CEST)
- Postal code: 85050
- Dialing code: 0975
- ISTAT code: 076079
- Patron saint: San Michele Arcangelo
- Saint day: 29 September
- Website: Official website

Sant'Angelo Le Fratte is a town and comune in the province of Potenza, in the Southern Italian region of Basilicata. As of 2011 its population was 1,457.

== Geography ==
Located near the border of Campania, Sant'Angelo is bounded by the comuni of Brienza, Caggiano (SA), Polla (SA), Satriano di Lucania, Savoia di Lucania, and Tito. It counts the hamlets (frazioni) of Farisi, Isca, Santa Maria Fellana, and San Vito.
