= Domenico Rossetti =

Italian painter

Domenico Rossetti (c. 1650–1736) was an Italian painter and engraver active mainly in Verona, Republic of Venice. He was known for his wood engravings and etchings.

== Biography ==
He was born in Venice and worked for years as Maestro della Stampe of the Zecca of Venice. He was patronized by Bishop Giovanni Francesco Barbarigo, who brought him to Verona, from where he traveled to Munich in Bavaria, and then to Düsseldorf, to work for over a decade as an engraver. Among his engravings is Il Pugilato, based on a painting by Pietro Liberi.

He designed the decorations for a room in the bishopric of Verona in which Saint Charles Borromeo had stayed. He designed an altar in the Oratorio della Concezione in Verona, next to the church of Santa Maria di Chiavica. He made a series of engravings of the works of Tintoretto.
