= Vietri di Potenza =

- Comune
- Comune di Vietri di Potenza
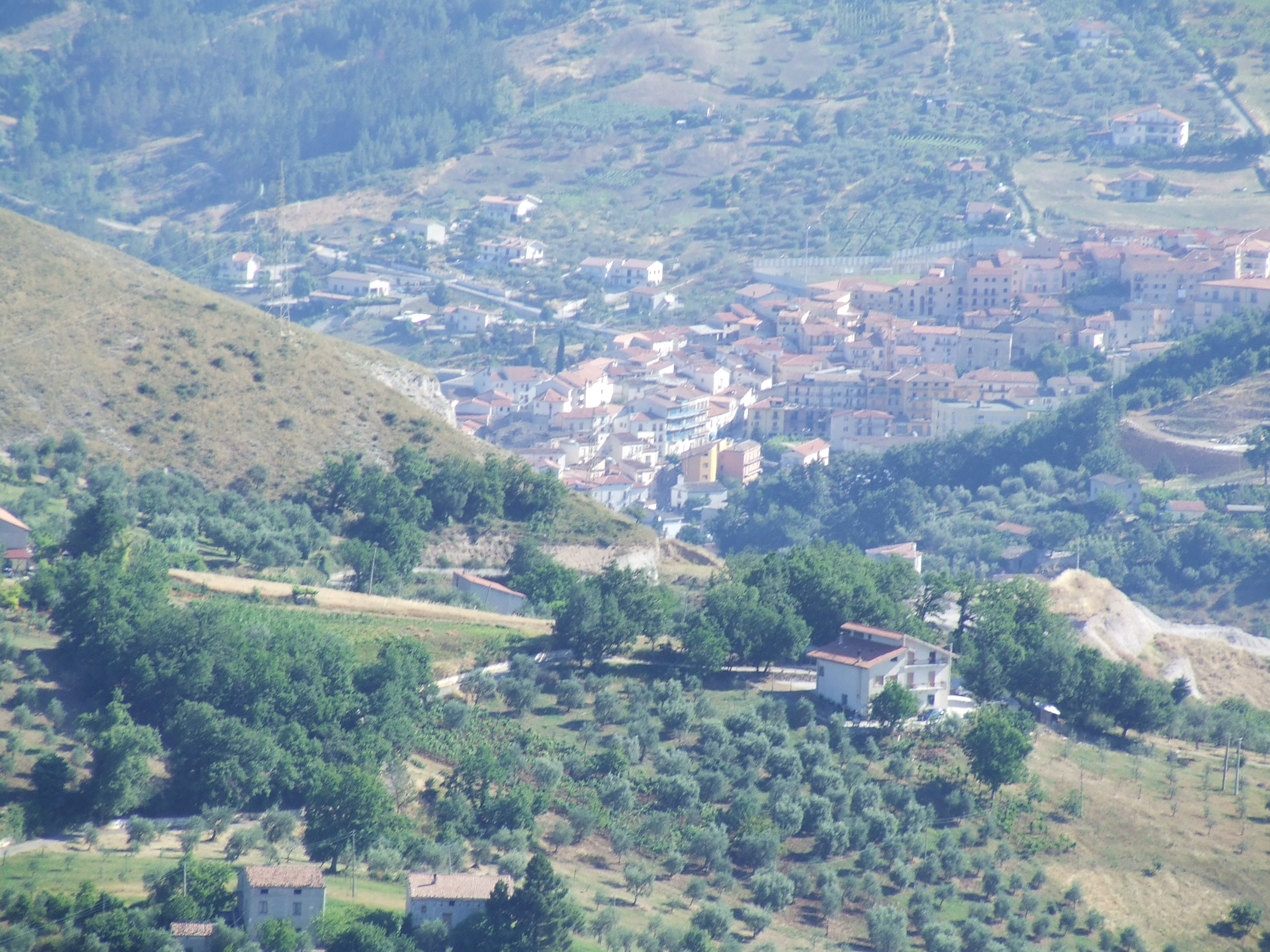
- View of Vietri di Potenza

- Location within Italy Location within Basilicata
- Coordinates: 40°36′N 15°30′E
- Country: Italy
- Region: Basilicata
- Province: Potenza (PZ)

Government
  - Mayor: Christian Giordano

Area
  - Total: 52 km^{2} (20 sq mi)
- Elevation: 405 m (1,329 ft)

Population (31 January 2013)
  - Total: 2,905
  - Density: 56/km^{2} (140/sq mi)
- Demonym: Vietresi
- Time zone: UTC+1 (CET)
  - Summer (DST): UTC+2 (CEST)
- Postal code: 85058
- Dialing code: 0971
- ISTAT code: 076096
- Patron saint: Sant'Anselmo
- Website: Official website

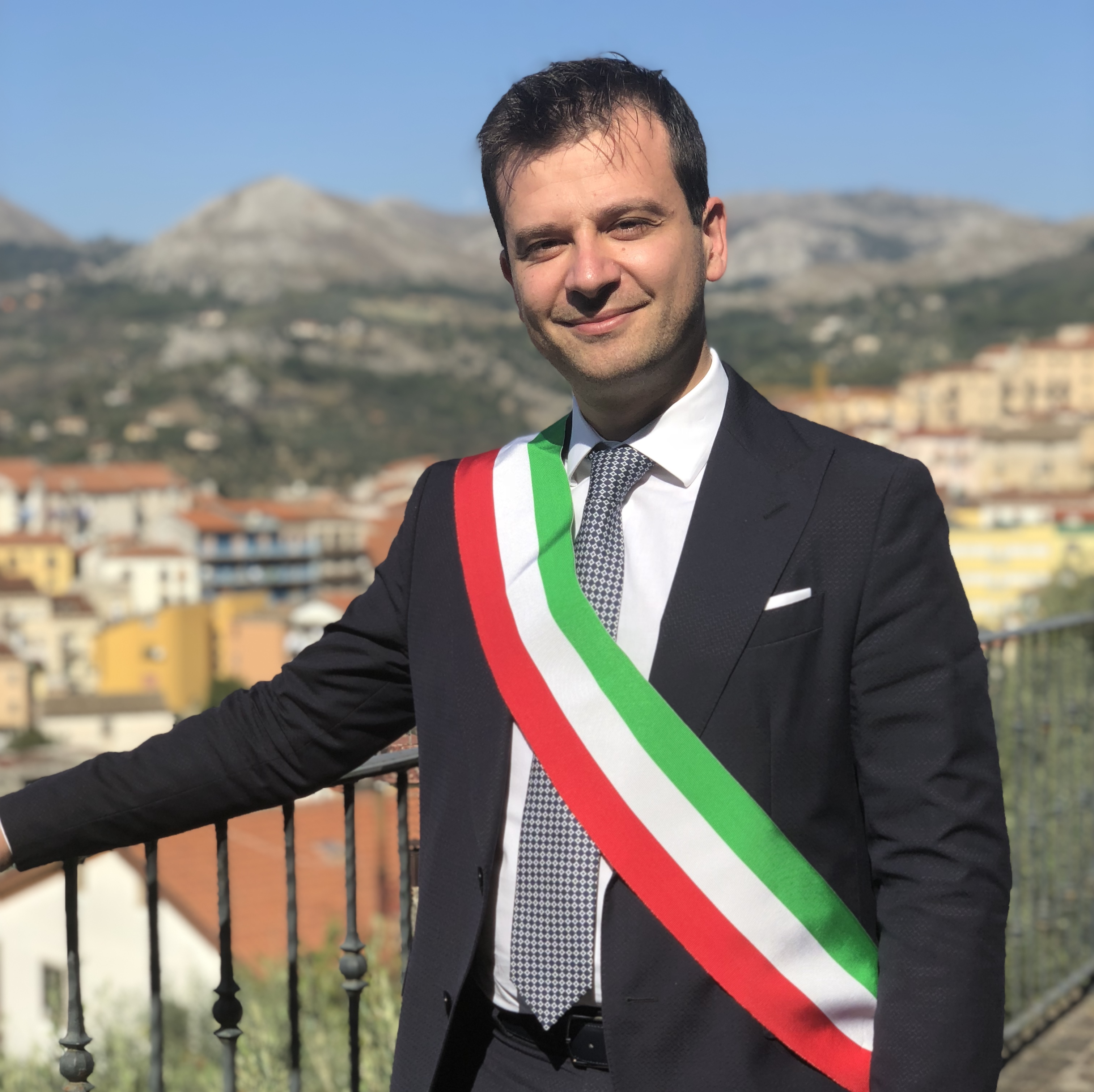
Christian Giordano

Vietri di Potenza is a town and comune in the province of Potenza, in the Basilicata region of southern Italy.

== Geography ==
The town is bordered by Balvano, Caggiano, Picerno, Romagnano al Monte, Salvitelle and Savoia di Lucania.
