= Giovanni Battista Belloti =

Italian painter

Giovanni Battista Belloti (1667 – January 23, 1730) was a Republic of Venice painter of the Baroque style, active mainly in Verona.

== Biography ==
He studied for three years with Andrea Voltolini in Verona, then moved to Venice to work in the studio of Antonio Bellucci. He painted numerous altarpieces in Verona for the churches of San Gregorio, San Francesco di Paolo, San Niccolò, and for the San Francesco chapel of San Fermo Maggiore. In the Collegio de' Nodari he frescoed a lunette with an Adoration of the Magi, as well as ovals with stories of the Old and New Testament, and miracles of San Zeno Bishop. He was buried in Santa Maria della Scala. Among his pupils is Giovanni Battista Zannoni. It is unclear if he is related to Bernardo Bellotto of Venice.
