= Francesco Mario Pagano =

Italian jurist (1748–1799)

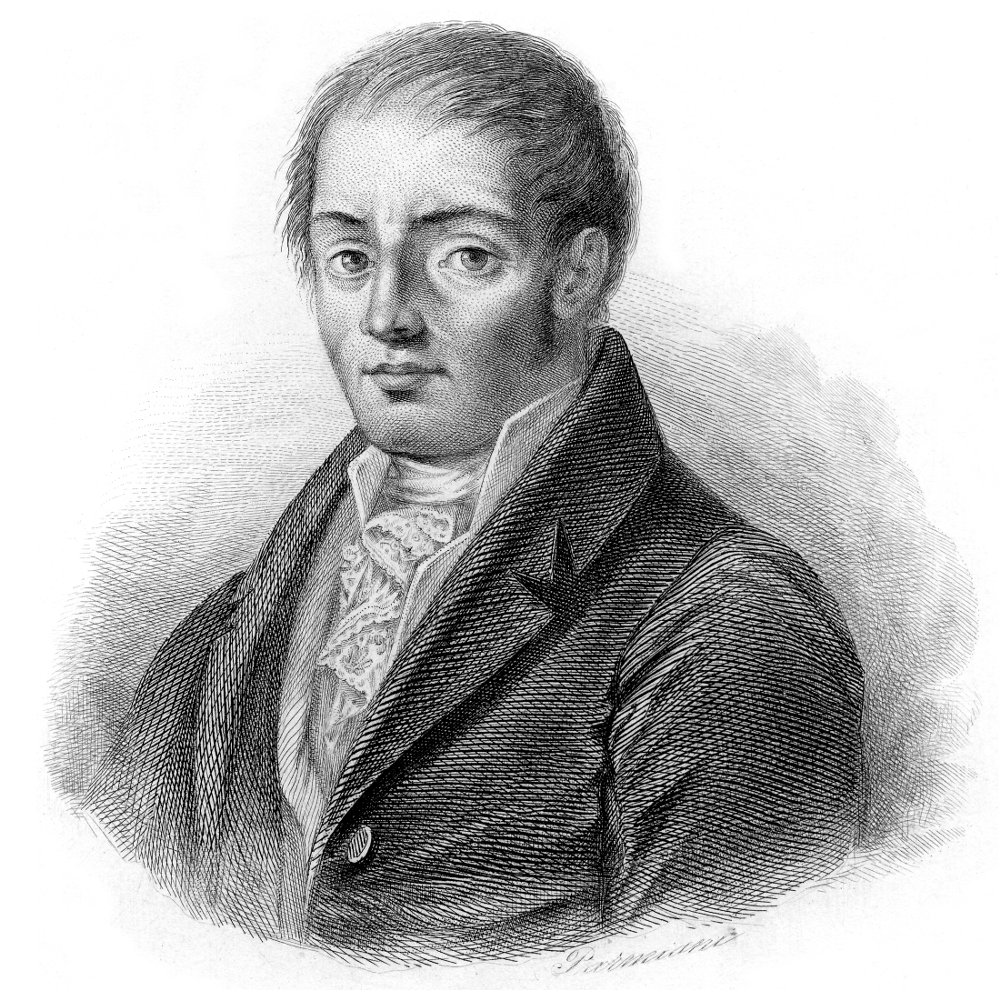
- Francesco Mario Pagano
- Born: 8 December 1748; Brienza, Province of Potenza, Kingdom of Naples
- Died: 29 October 1799 (aged 50); Naples, Kingdom of Naples
- Other name: Mario Pagano
- Education: University of Naples Federico II
- Occupations: Jurist; Author
- Years active: 1768–1799
- Notable work: Saggi politici (1783–85); Progetto di Costituzione della Repubblica napoletana; Sul processo criminale; Esame politico dell'intera legislazione romana; Discorso sull’origine e natura della poesia; Gerbino; Agamennone; Corradino; Gli esuli tebani; Prometeo; Teodosio; Emilia

Francesco Mario Pagano (8 December 1748 – 29 October 1799) was an Italian jurist, author, thinker, and the founder of the Neapolitan school of law. He is regarded as one of the most influential Enlightenment thinkers. A moderate reformist, he is seen as a forerunner of the Italian unification.

== Biography ==
He was born in Brienza in the southern Province of Potenza. He studied at the University of Naples Federico II under Antonio Genovesi. At the age of twenty, he became special lecturer in moral philosophy there, at the same time practising law. He was friend of Gaetano Filangieri, entering the masonry with him, and was elected venerable master of the Neapolitan lodge "La philantropia". Pagano was one of the men who powerfully helped Italy in her social and scientific advancement and in the 1790s, he had striven more than any other intellectual to give a political form to the 18th century reform tradition in southern Italy.

In 1794, he defended Vincenzo Galiani, Vincenzo Vitaliani and Emanuele De Deo – three alleged conspirators against Ferdinand IV; after they were sentenced to death, Pagano was deprived of his professorship, arrested, imprisoned and expelled from the kingdom. After fleeing Naples in 1796, he returned in 1799 and drafted the constitution of the short-lived Neapolitan Republic. The document bore similarities to the French Constitution of 1793 but presented original traits such as the institution of the "body of ephors", an authority who would have overseen the maintenance of the law. It is considered the precursor of the modern constitutional court.

After the fall of the republic, Pagano was arrested and imprisoned in the Castel Nuovo. He was executed by hanging at the "Piazza del Mercato" in Naples, along with other revolutionaries: Domenico Cirillo, Giorgio Pigliacelli and Ignazio Ciaia.

== Works ==
Pagano's Saggi politici (1783–85) provided a philosophical history of the Kingdom of Naples, arguing against torture and capital punishment and advocating more benign penal codes. Considerazioni sul processo criminale (Considerations on the criminal trial, 1787), gave him international popularity and was much praised by Le Moniteur Universel, the main newspaper of revolutionary France.

Pagano's other juridical or philosophical works included:

- Progetto di Costituzione della Repubblica napoletana
- Sul processo criminale
- Esame politico dell'intera legislazione romana
- Discorso sull’origine e natura della poesia

He also translated works from Greek and Latin, and wrote six tragedies (Gerbino, Agamennone, Corradino, Gli esuli tebani, Prometeo, and Teodosio) and one comedy (Emilia).
