= Guglielmo Capodoro =

Italian painter

Guglielmo Capodoro (born c. 1670) was an Italian painter of the Baroque period. He was born in Modena. He trained under Antonio Calza and mainly painted battle paintings in the style of Jacques Courtois
