= Giovanni Passannante =

Italian anarchist who attempted to assassinate king Umberto I

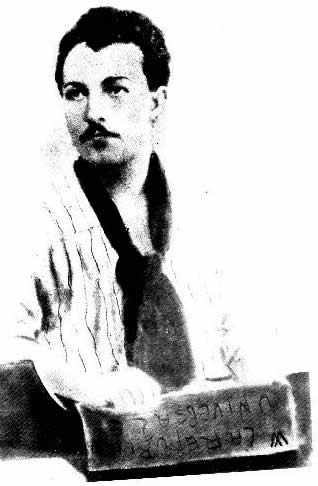
- Born: 19 February 1849; Salvia di Lucania, Basilicata
- Died: 14 February 1910 (aged 60); Montelupo Fiorentino, Tuscany
- Occupation: Cook
- Status: Dead
- Conviction: Attempted murder of Umberto I of Italy
- Penalty: Life imprisonment

Giovanni Passannante (Italian pronunciation: [dʒoˈvanni passanˈnante]; 19 February 1849 – 14 February 1910) was an Italian anarchist who attempted to assassinate king Umberto I of Italy, the first attempt against Savoy monarchy since its origins. Originally condemned to death, his sentence was later commuted to life imprisonment. The conditions of his imprisonment drove him insane and have been denounced as inhumane.

== Biography ==
=== Attempted murder ===
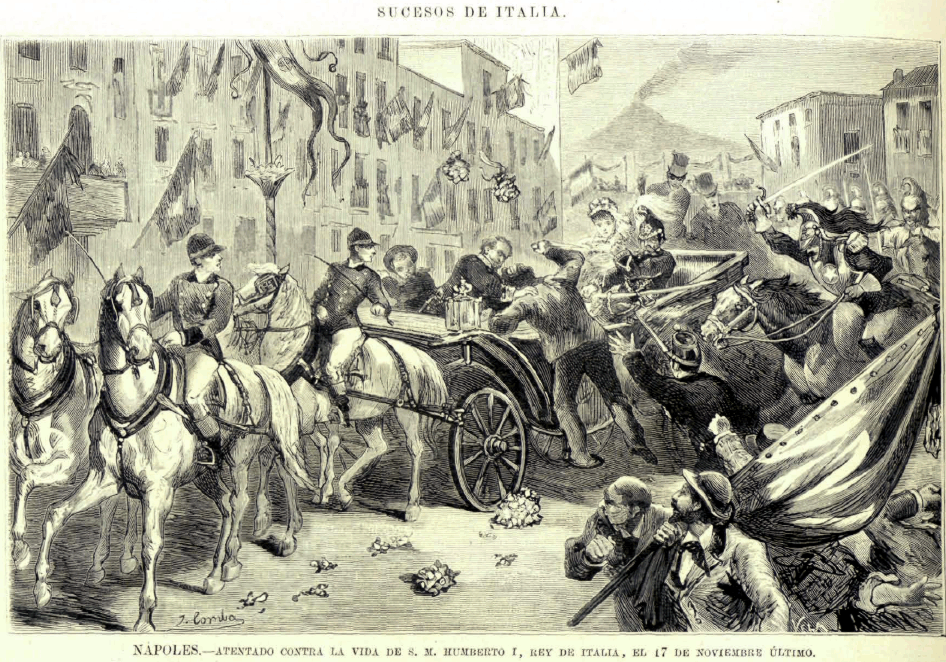
Passannante attacking the king

After the death of his father Victor Emmanuel II, Umberto I prepared a tour of the major cities of Italy to present himself as the new sovereign. He was accompanied by his wife Margherita and the prime minister Benedetto Cairoli. The royal entourage planned to visit Naples, although there was a heated argument in the city council about the high cost that would be incurred on its reception.

On 17 November 1878, Umberto I and his court were parading in Naples. Passannante was among the crowd, waiting for the right moment to act. While the king was on Largo della Carriera Grande, he approached his carriage, faking a supplication; suddenly, he pulled out a knife and attacked him yelling, "Long live Orsini! Long live the Universal Republic!"

Umberto I managed to deflect the weapon, receiving a slight wound on his arm. Queen Margherita threw a bouquet of flowers in his face and shouted: «Cairoli, save the king!». Cairoli grabbed him by his hair, but the prime minister was wounded in his leg. The captain of the cuirassiers, Stefano De Giovannini, was able to hit Passannante on the head with a sabre, and he was arrested. Passannante had tried to kill the king with a knife with a blade of 12 cm (4.7 in) for which he traded his jacket. The weapon was wrapped in a red rag on which was written, "Death to the King! Long live the Universal Republic! Long live Orsini!"

=== Consequences ===
The attempted regicide shocked the entire nation, and the government feared an anarchist conspiracy. Passannante's action brought disorder in many cities, with a total of several dead, wounded, and arrested. On 18 November of the same year, in Florence, a group of anarchists threw a bomb into a crowd that was celebrating the king's survival. Two men and one girl were killed, and over ten people were injured. Another bomb exploded in Pisa with no casualties, and in Pesaro a barrack was assaulted.

Some republicans such as Alberto Mario condemned his action. The poet Giovanni Pascoli, during a socialist reunion in Bologna, gave a public reading of his Ode to Passannante of which there is no trace anymore because Pascoli destroyed it immediately after his reading. Only the last verse is known, of which this paraphrase has been handed down: "Con la berretta d'un cuoco faremo una bandiera" (With the cook's cap, we'll make a flag). After the arrest of some anarchists who protested against Passannante's detention, Pascoli and a group of internationalists protested against the verdict, and the poet shouted, "If these are evil-doers, then long life to evil-doers!" Pascoli and the internationalists were arrested.

Some newspapers directed baseless charges against Passannante: Verona's L'Arena and Milan's Corriere della Sera portrayed him as a brigand who had killed a woman in the past, while in a lithograph published in Turin, it was reported that his father was a camorrista. A few days after the attempted murder, Cairoli's government was strongly accused of inability to maintain public order, and, after a rejected motion of confidence presented by the minister Guido Baccelli, Cairoli resigned.

Passannante's family was jailed; only his brother was able to escape. Giovanni Parrella, mayor of Salvia di Lucania, went to Naples to apologize and ask for a pardon from Umberto I. In a sign of forgiveness, on the order of the monarch's counsellors, Passannante's hometown was forced to change its name to Savoia di Lucania, by a royal decree on 3 July 1879.

=== Sentence and death ===
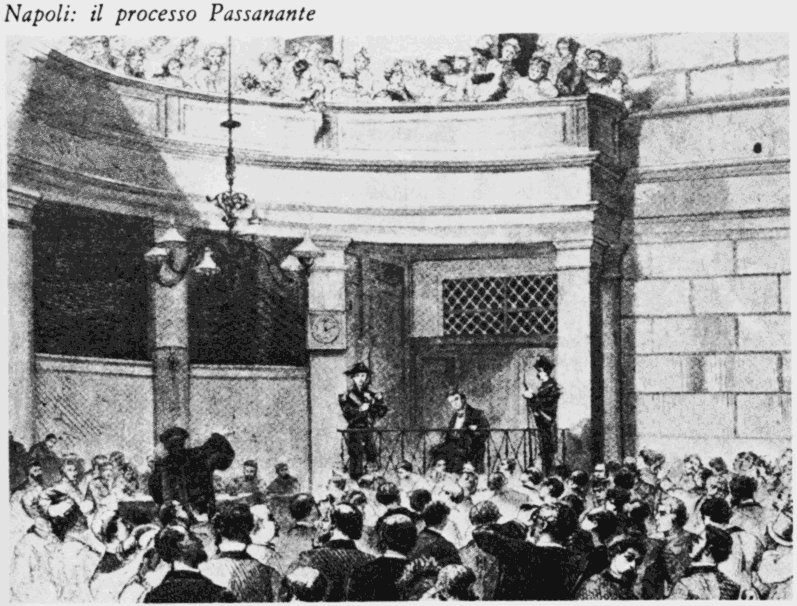
Trial of Passannante

During the trial, held on 6 and 7 March 1879, Passannante stated that he had acted alone. He claimed that the ideas of Risorgimento had been betrayed and that the government was indifferent to the impact on already poor people of increases in the flour tax. Passannante was sentenced to death on 29 March 1879, although capital punishment was expected only in instances of actual regicide. His sentence was commuted to life imprisonment.

He was imprisoned in Portoferraio on the island of Elba, off the Tuscan coast, in a small and dark cell below sea level, with no toilet facilities and in complete isolation. His mental condition deteriorated in these harsh conditions of solitary confinement and reportedly he was brutally tortured. He fell ill with scurvy, became infested with taenia solium and lost body hair. His skin became discoloured and his eyes were affected by the lack of light. According to later testimony, he came to eat his own faeces. Seamen sailing near his prison heard Passannante's screams.

In 1899, the parliamentarian Agostino Bertani and the journalist Anna Maria Mozzoni reported Passannante's maltreatment, causing a scandal. After an examination of the prisoner by Professors Serafino Biffi and Augusto Tamburini, who found him in very poor condition, the anarchist was transferred to the asylum of Montelupo Fiorentino. The physicians there were unable to reverse his mental and physical deterioration. Passannante died in Montelupo Fiorentino, at the age of 60, five days before his 61st birthday.

=== Post mortem ===
After his death, his corpse was beheaded, and his head and brain became the subject of the study of criminologists, under the theories of anthropologist Cesare Lombroso. In 1935, his brain and skull, preserved in formaldehyde, were sent to the Criminal Museum in Rome, where they were displayed for over 70 years.

The permanence of the remains at the Museum ranked as one of Italy's more macabre showcases, causing protests and parliamentary questions. In 1998, the then Italian Minister of Justice, Oliviero Diliberto, authored a decree allowing for the displacement of his remains to Savoia di Lucania, but it was not acted on until 2007. Passannante's skull and brain remained in the museum, in a neon-lit display case.

On the night of 10 May 2007, the remains of Passannante were taken to Savoia di Lucania and buried secretly, with the presence only of Rosina Ricciardi, mayor of the town; an undersecretary of Vito De Filippo, governor of Basilicata; and a journalist of La Nuova Del Sud. Some say it was required by monarchists because they did not want him to receive any publicity. On 2 June 2007, there was a mass in memory of the deceased in the mother church of the town.

== Filmography ==
- Passannante (2011), directed by Sergio Colabona, starring Fabio Troiano, Ulderico Pesce, Andrea Satta and Luca Lionello.
