= Giovanni Maria Viani =

Italian painter and engraver (1636–1700)

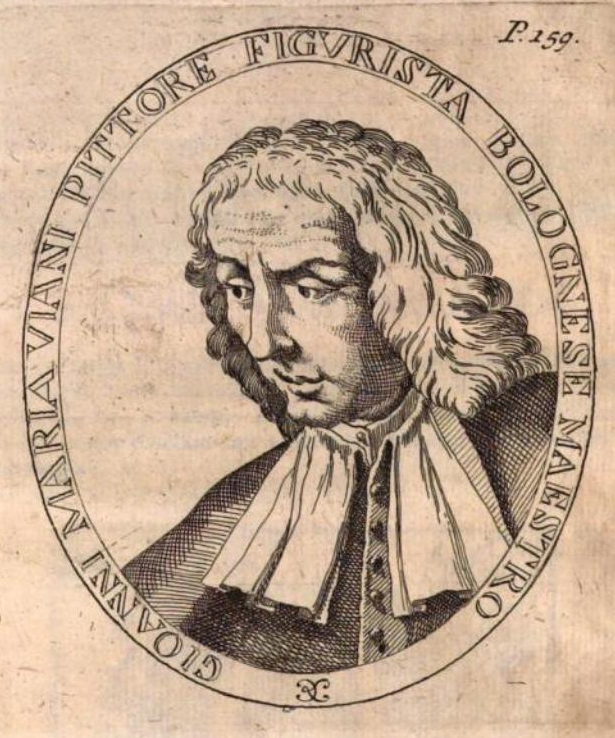
Giovanni Maria Viani

Giovanni Maria Viani (1636–1700) was an Italian painter of the Baroque period active in Bologna.

== Biography ==
Along with Lorenzo Pasinelli, he trained under Flaminio Torre. Among Giovanni's pupils was his son, Domenico (1668–1711), Giovanni Girolamo Bonesi, and Odoardo Perini. Another pupil was Pier Francesco Cavazza. He directed a school at Bologna rivaling that of Carlo Cignani. He painted many pictures for the public buildings of Bologna, among them an Annunciation in San Giuseppe (Sposo); and at the Basilica of the Servi, he painted a Glory of St Filippo Benizi and the Coronation of the Virgin.

Among his etchings are:

- Christ crowned with Thorns & St Francis with Infant Jesus in his arms after Annibale Carracci
- Dido and War after Ludovico Carracci.
