= Odoardo Perini =

Italian painter

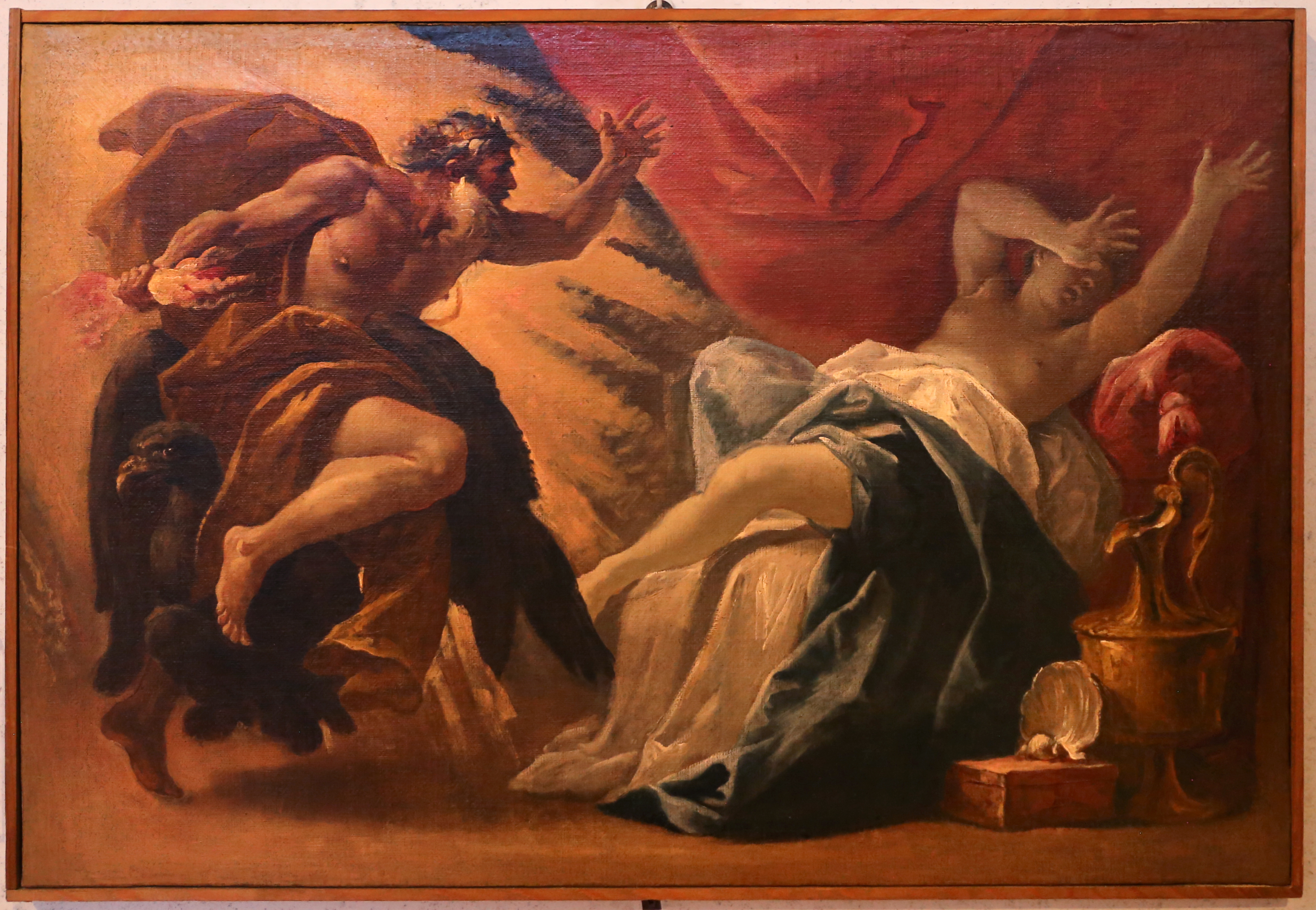
Jupiter and Semele, Verona, Castelvecchio

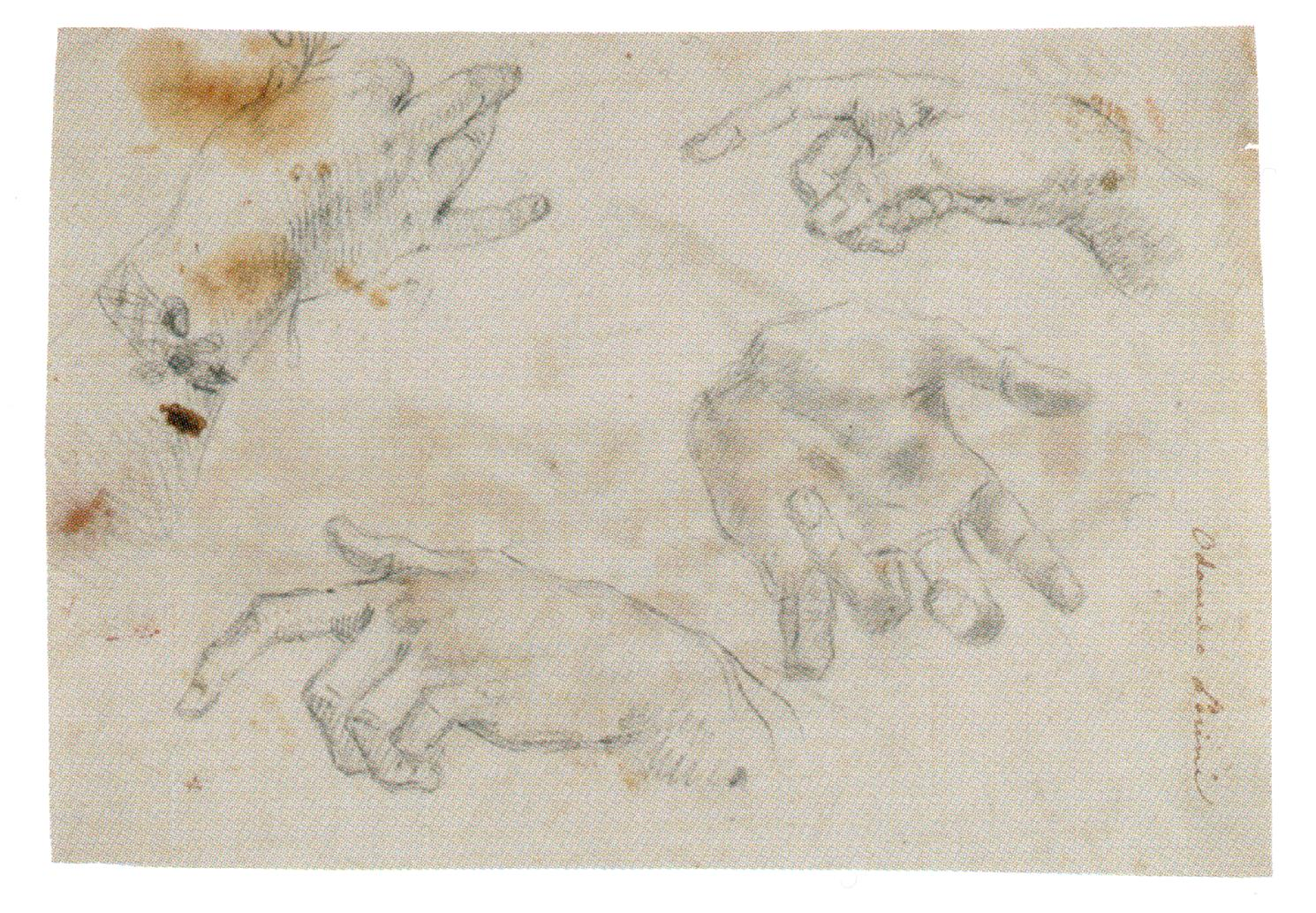
Odoardo Perini: Study of Hand

Odoardo Perini (5 April 1671 – 29 December 1757) was an Italian painter of the late-Baroque period, active in Verona.

== Biography ==
He first apprenticed with Andrea Voltolino. He then trained in Bologna under Giovanni Maria Viani. He painted a series of canvases of classical stories for the Count Ercole Giusti. He painted some religious canvases for the Colombini in Bologna. He was described by Carlo Ridolfi as having a ‘’very strange brain’’ with his paintings equally strange.

The Fondazione Cariverona has a Perini canvas depicting Tancredo al campo crociato piange la morte di Clorinda (Tancred in the Crusader camp mourns the death of Clorinda), a work once part of series of depictions of Gerusalemma Liberata owned by Count Ercole Giusti in his Veronese palace. The series included a work each by Perini, Carl Loth, Antonio Bellucci, Antonio Fumiani, Gregorio Lazzarini, and Simone Brentana. Also on display in the same hall were two mythological subjects by also by Loth, and five landscapes by Giovanni Ruggieri.
