= Antonio Calza =

Italian painter (1658–1725)

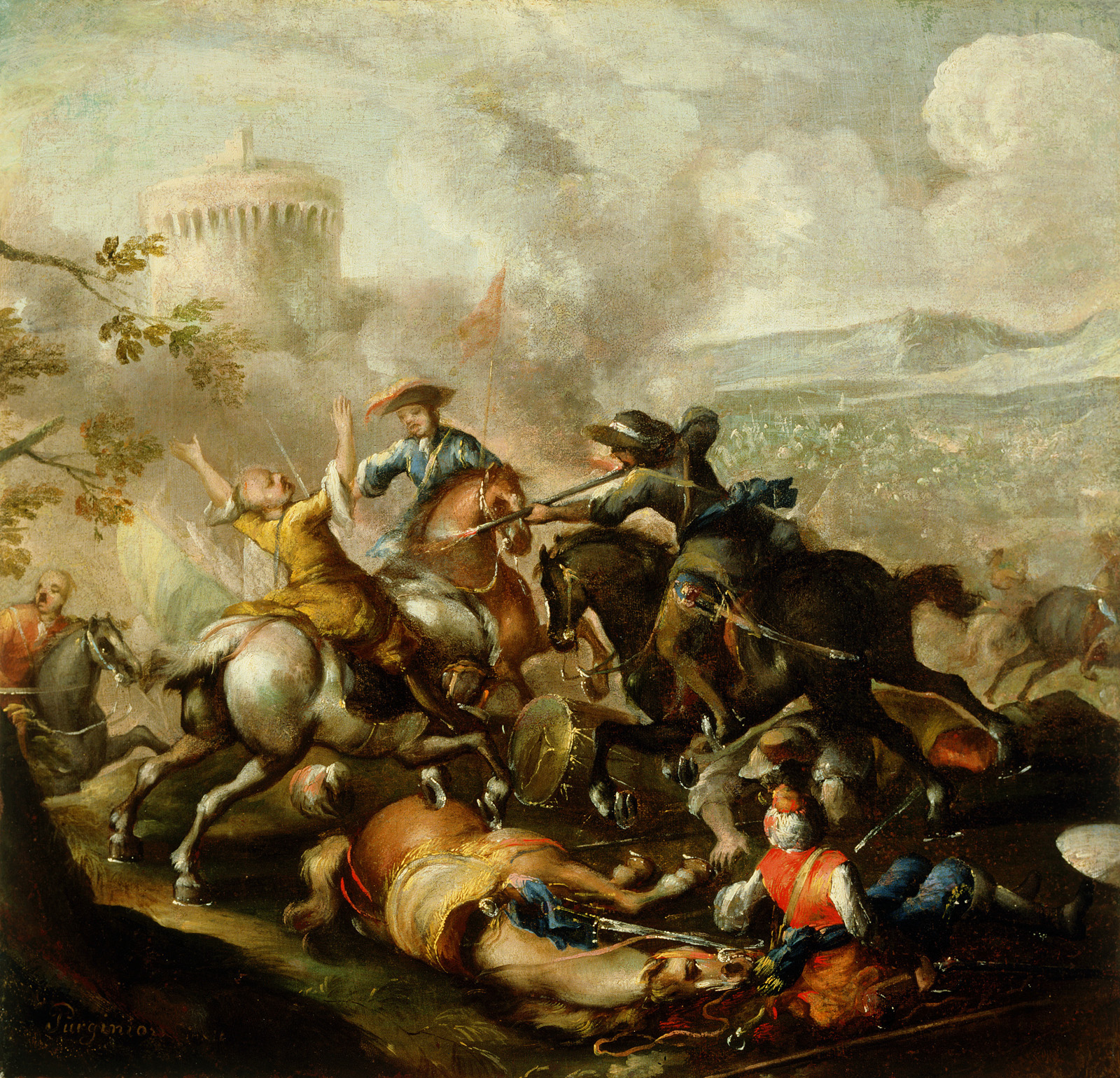
Battle with Turks, oil on canvas, National Gallery of Slovenia, Ljubljana

Antonio Calza (1658 – 18 April 1725) was an Italian painter of the Baroque period, known for his historical and battle paintings.

== Biography ==
Antonio Calza was born in Verona to a jeweler. He was the pupil of the Bolognese painter Carlo Cignani, then moved to Rome to work under Jacques Courtois. Guglielmo Capodoro (Paganini) and Giovanni Battista Canziani were his pupils. Calza, who worked mostly in Bologna, is known for painting historical and battle paintings.

In 1675, he reconciled with his father, and married an 88-year-old widow. He was to marry three times, the last in 1710 to a painter of flower still lifes. He painted in Milan for General Martini, and in Vienna for Prince Eugenie, including portraits of the Prince and the Emperor. He died in Verona on April 18, 1725.

Paintings by Antonio Calza

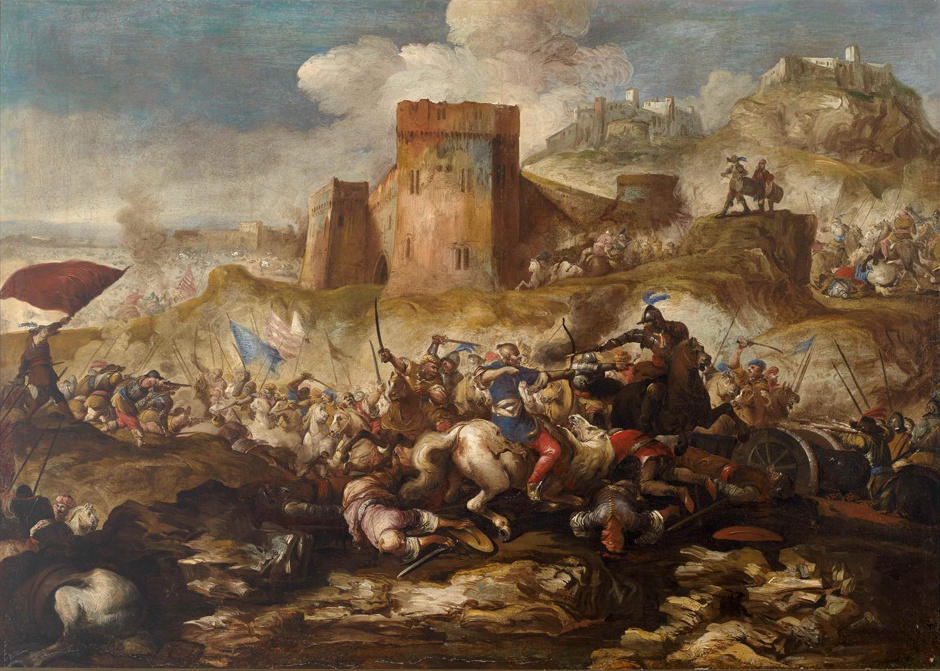
Antonio Calza - Battle in front of the walls af a fortified town, oil on canvas, National Gallery of Slovenia, Ljubljana

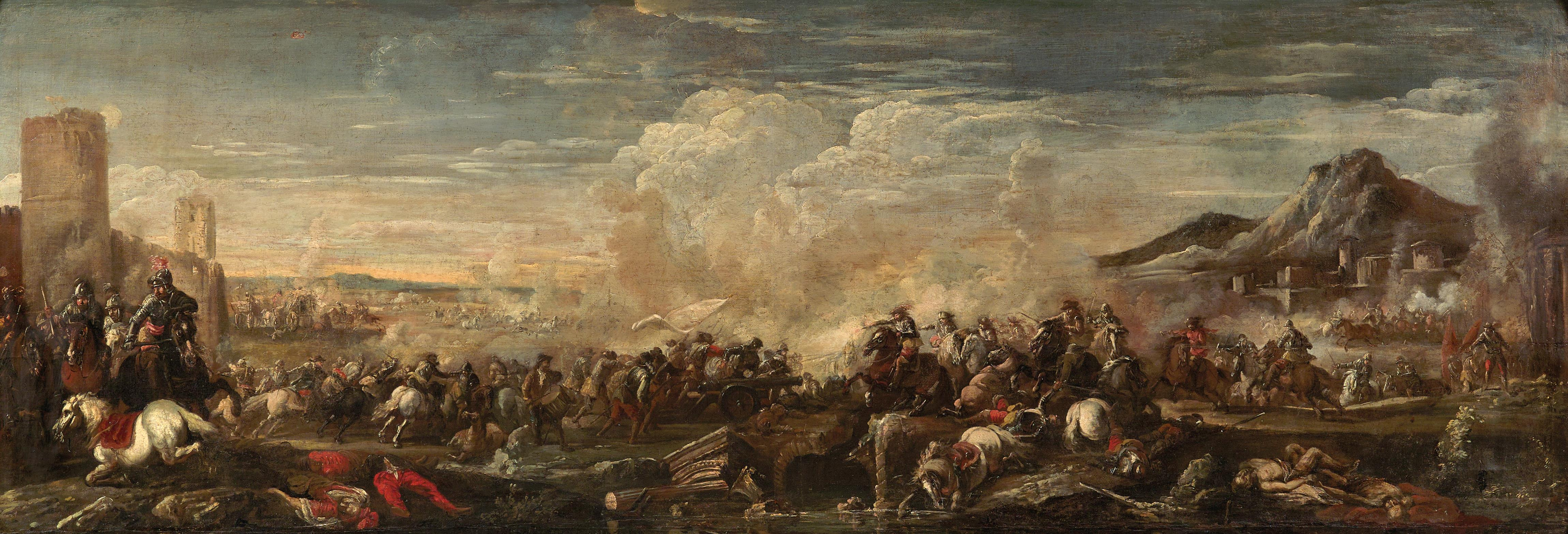
Battle Scene, priv. col.

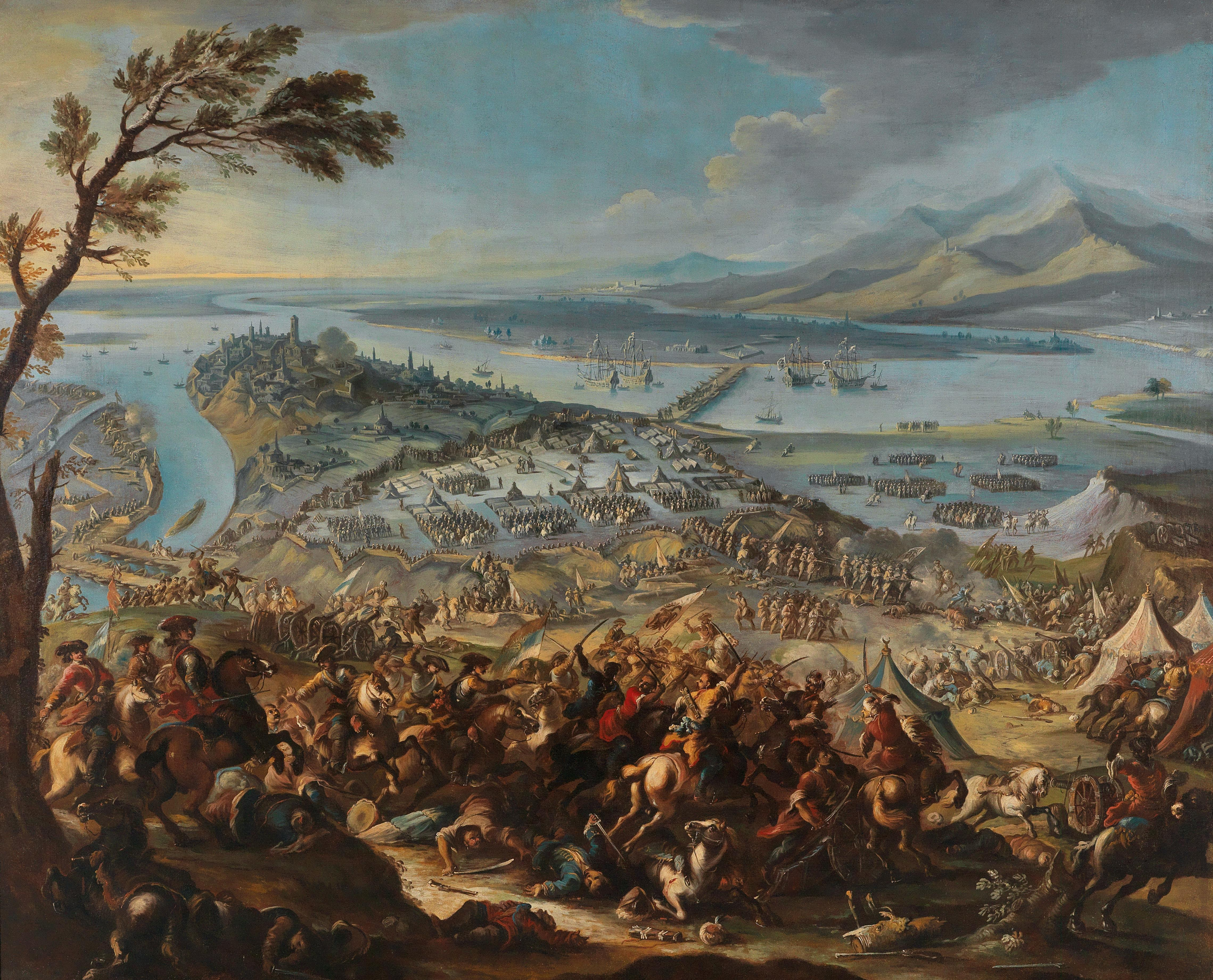
An Episode from the Battle of Belgrade, priv. col.

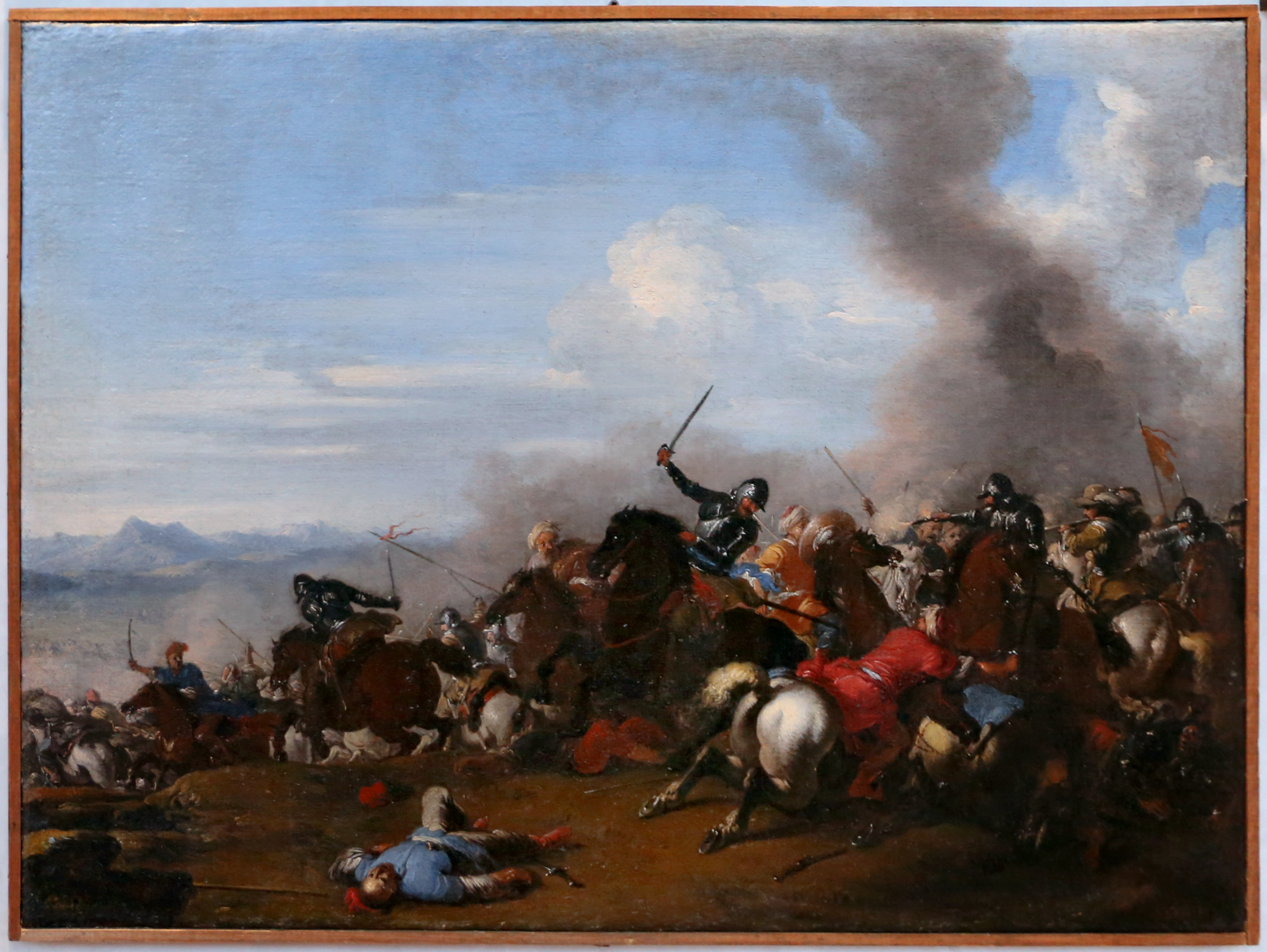
Battle Scene, Castelvecchio Museum, Verona

== Commons ==
- Ivanoff, Nicola (1974). "CALZA, Antonio". Dizionario Biografico degli Italiani (in Italian). Vol. 17: Calvart–Canefri. Rome: Istituto dell'Enciclopedia Italiana. ISBN 978-88-12-00032-6.
