= Antonio Voltolini =

Italian painter

Antonio Voltolino or Voltolini (1643–1718) was an Italian painter of the Baroque style.

== Biography ==
He studied with Biagio Falcieri in Verona. He painted in the Sacristy of San Bernardino, Verona. His pupils included Giovanni Battista Belloti (1667-1730), Giovanni Battista Canziani (died 1730), Antonio Corte, Giovanni Battista Lanceni (1659-1735), and Odoardo Perini (1671-1757).
