= Pertosa =

- Comune
- Comune di Pertosa
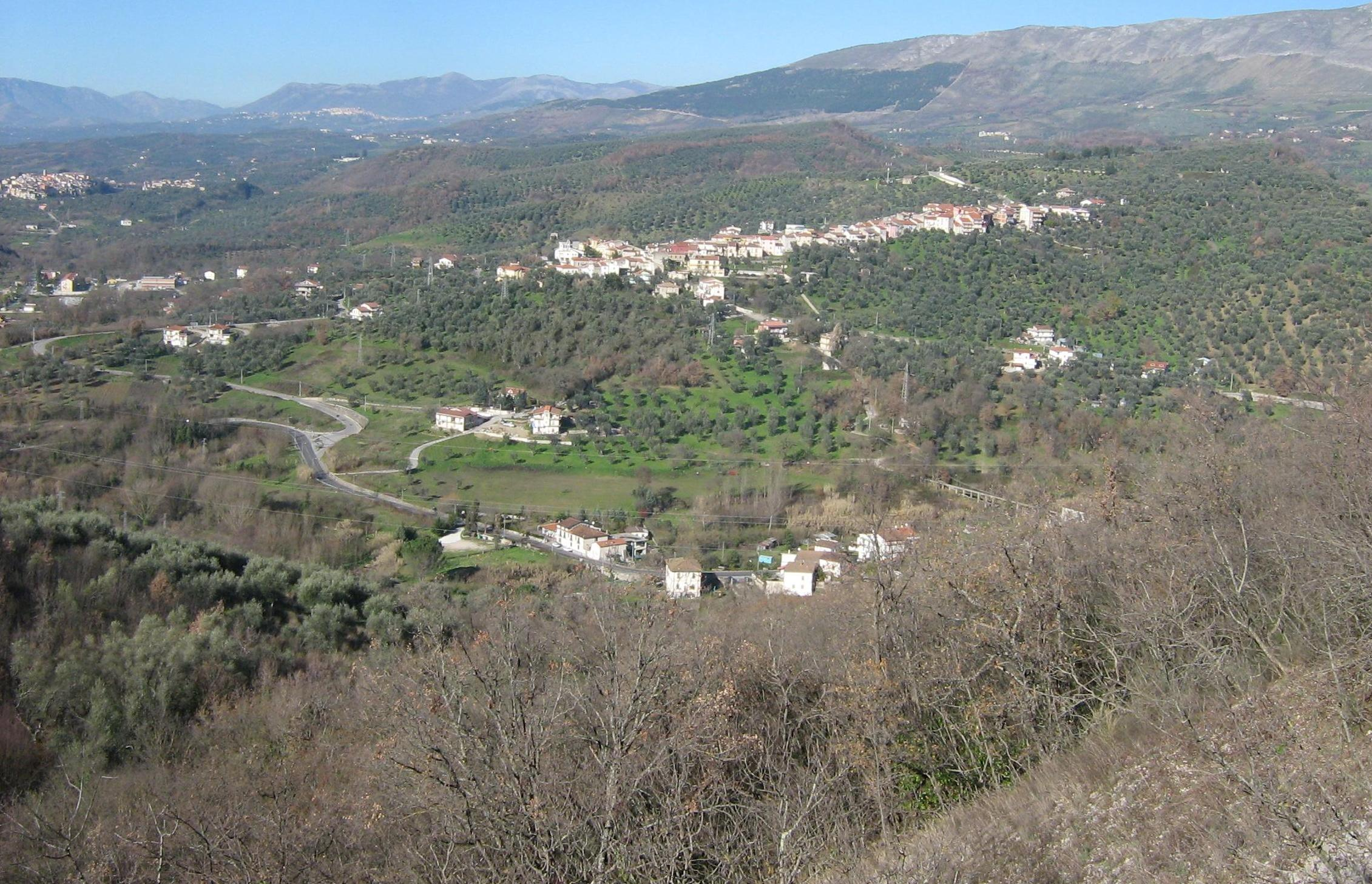
- Panorama

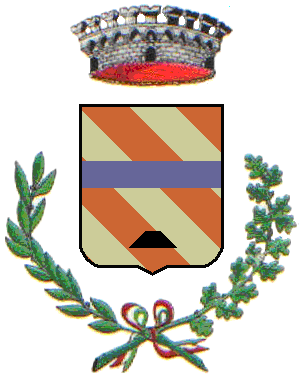
- Coat of arms

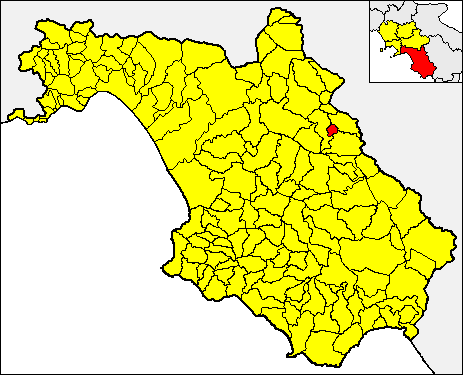
- Pertosa within the Province of Salerno

- Location within Italy Location within Campania
- Coordinates: 40°33′N 15°27′E
- Country: Italy
- Region: Campania
- Province: Salerno (SA)
- Frazioni: Muraglione

Area
  - Total: 6 km^{2} (2.3 sq mi)
- Elevation: 310 m (1,020 ft)

Population (31-12-2010)
  - Total: 714
  - Density: 120/km^{2} (310/sq mi)
- Demonym: Pertosani
- Time zone: UTC+1 (CET)
  - Summer (DST): UTC+2 (CEST)
- Postal code: 84030
- Dialing code: 0975
- Website: Official website

Pertosa is a village and comune of the province of Salerno in the Campania region of south-west Italy. In 2010 its population was 714.

== Geography ==
The village is situated in the eastern side of the province of Salerno, close to the municipalities of Auletta, Polla and Caggiano and to Alburni mountains. Its only hamlet (frazione) is the little village of Muraglione, in which are located the show caves.

== Demographics ==
At the census in 2001 the town had a population of 727, a drop from the 897 at the previous census in 1991.

== Main sights ==
Pertosa is a receptive tourist place principally for its karst show cave system, the Pertosa Caves (Grotte di Pertosa). The caves are located in the valley below the town, by the river Tanagro.

== Gallery ==
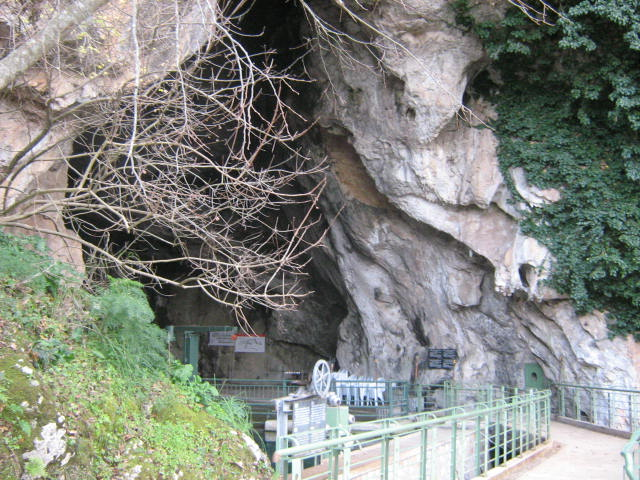
Entrance of the touristic caves

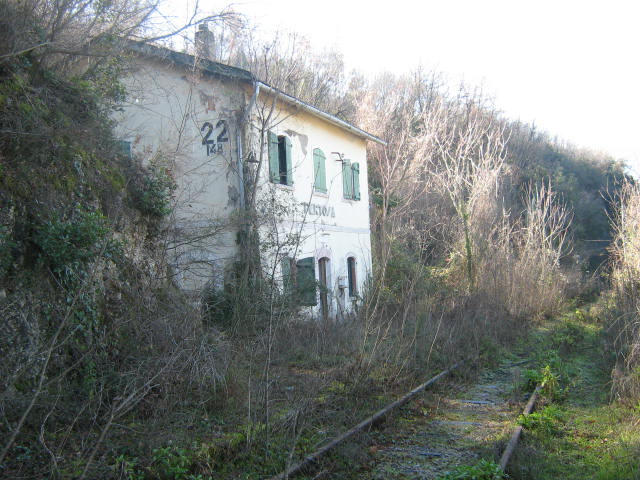
Railway station

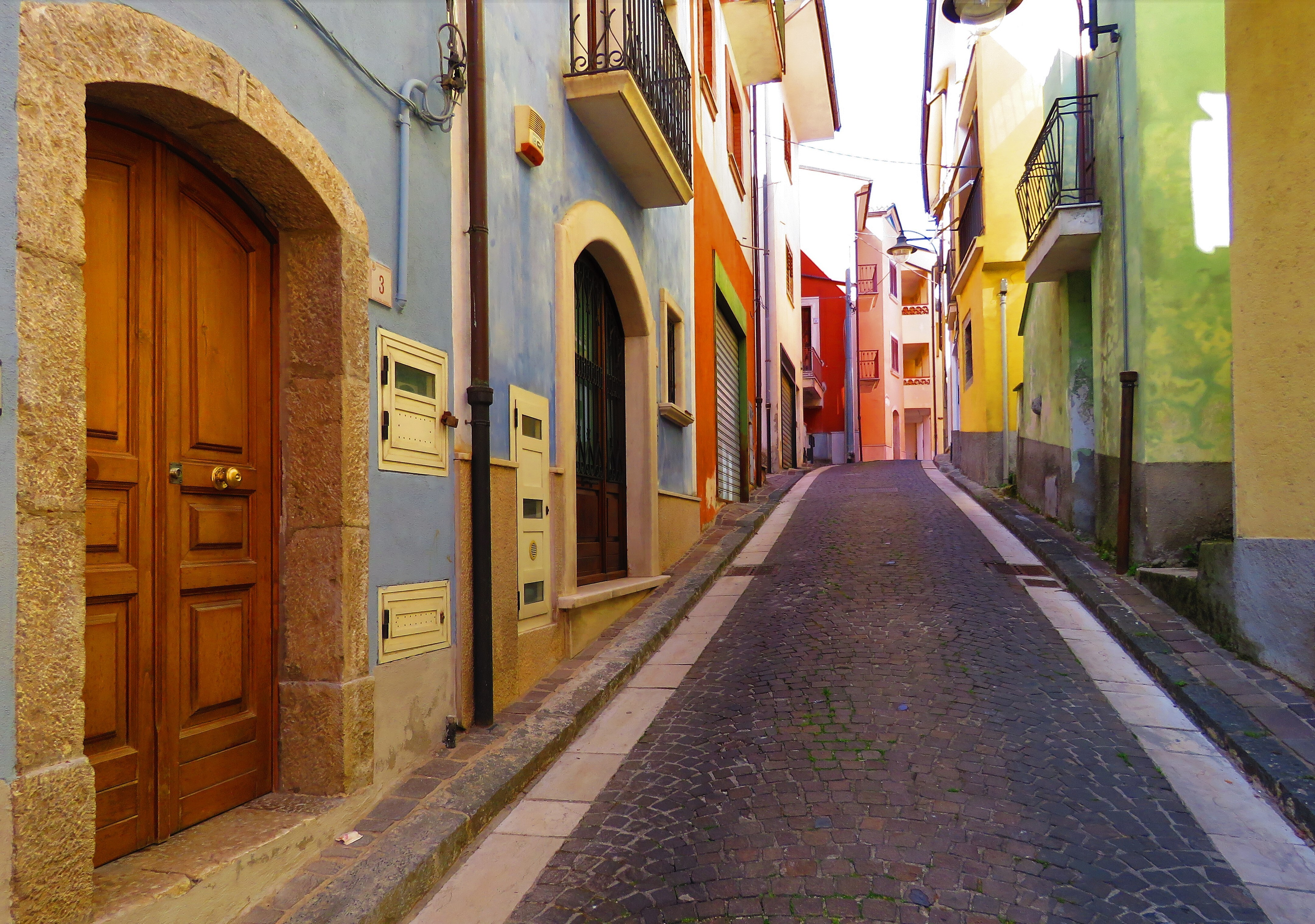
Street in Pertosa

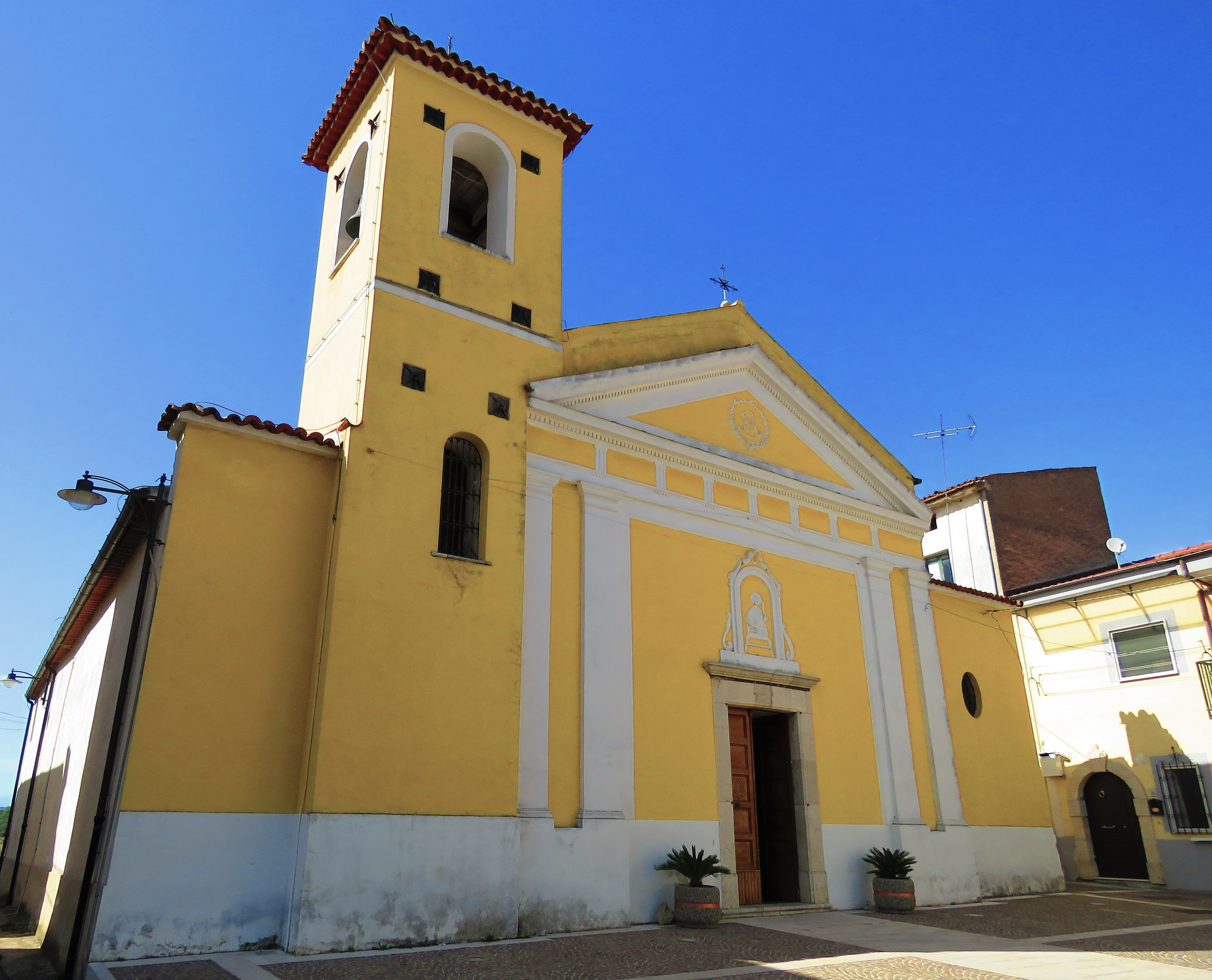
Santa Maria delle Grazie

== See also ==
- Cilento
- Vallo di Diano
