= Domenico Maria Viani =

Italian painter (1668–1711)

Domenico Maria Viani (1668–1711) was an Italian painter of the Baroque period.

== Biography ==
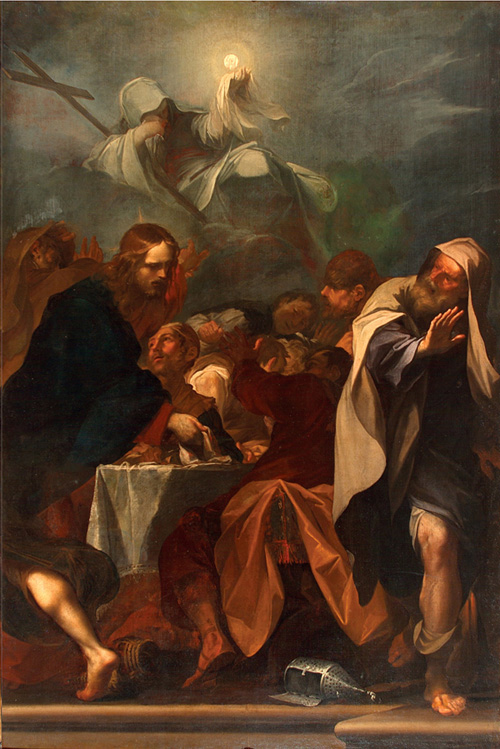
Christ rejects those contesting the Eucharist, on display at Museu Nacional de Belas Artes Rio de Janeiro

He was born in Bologna, the son of Giovanni Maria Viani, and was educated there under his father, who kept a rival academy to that of Carlo Cignani. For the church of La Natività at Bologna, there is a series of Prophets and Evangelists by him; for the church of Santo Spirito, Bergamo, he painted a Miracle of St Antony of Padua. He disappeared in Pistoia where he is also thought to have died.
