= Savoia di Lucania =

- Comune
- Comune di Savoia di Lucania
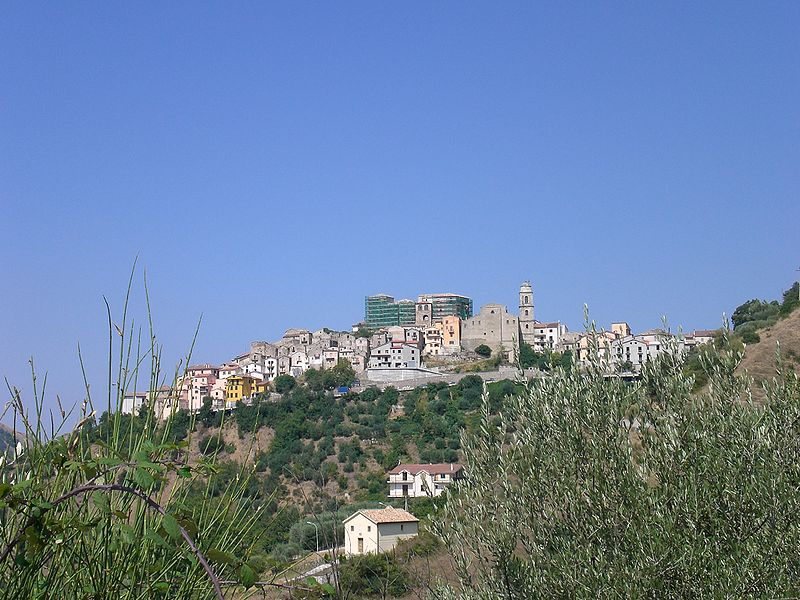
- View of Savoia di Lucania

- Coat of arms

- Savoia di Lucania within the Province of Potenza

- Location within Italy Location within Basilicata
- Coordinates: 40°34′N 15°33′E
- Country: Italy
- Region: Basilicata
- Province: Potenza (PZ)
- Frazioni: Castellaro, Fossati, Perolla

Government
  - Mayor: Rosina Ricciardi

Area
  - Total: 32 km^{2} (12 sq mi)
- Elevation: 750 m (2,460 ft)

Population (31 March 2013)
  - Total: 1,143
  - Density: 36/km^{2} (93/sq mi)
- Demonym: Salviani
- Time zone: UTC+1 (CET)
  - Summer (DST): UTC+2 (CEST)
- Postal code: 85050
- Dialing code: 0971
- ISTAT code: 076084
- Patron saint: Saint Roch
- Saint day: 16 August
- Website: Official website

Savoia di Lucania (Lucano: Savòie) is a town and comune in the province of Potenza, in the Southern Italian region of Basilicata. As of 2011 its population was 1,148.

== History ==
The original name of the village was Salvia di Lucania (also simply Salvia), referring to the sage plant (Salvia officinalis). It was altered at the end of the 19th century to Savoia di Lucania after a local resident and anarchist, Giovanni Passannante, attempted to kill King Umberto I of Italy on November 17, 1878.

In the early 2000s it was proposed to return to the original toponym, removing the references to the House of Savoy. Two committees have been constituted, one for the return to the toponym of Salvia, and another for the maintenance of the current name.

== Geography ==
Located near the borders with Campania, Savoia is bounded by the comuni of Caggiano (SA), Picerno, Sant'Angelo Le Fratte, Satriano di Lucania, Tito, and Vietri di Potenza. It counts the hamlets (frazioni) of Castellaro, Fossati, and Perolla.

== Notable people ==
- Giovanni Passannante (1849–1910), anarchist
