= Francesco Turchi =

Italian writer and scholar

Francesco Turchi OCarm (Treviso, 1515 – Conscio, 1599) was a 16th-century writer and scholar, as well as a priest in the Carmelite order living in Treviso.

== Biography ==
A Carmelite friar, Turchi was active in the editing of works by the printing firms of Giolito, Giunti, and others active in Venice. He added notes to the Poems (Rime) by Bembo; works by Ludovico Ariosto; the Memorial of a Christian life by Louis of Granada; Lo Specchio della croce by Cavalca. He published a work of Salmi Penitenziali, an Epithalamium, and a collection of his letters. It was disputed by Apostolo Zeno whether he deserved credit for a Supplement to the work of Livy, containing lost books from the history, in a volume translated into Tuscan Italian by Nardi, and published by Giunti in 1573. Zeno attributed the work to Johann Freinsheim.

In 1580, Turchi gave the oration in Rome at the confirmation of Giovanni Battista Caffardi as the head of the Carmelite order.

== Bibliography ==
- Fontanini, Giusto (1804). Biblioteca dell'eloquenza italiana [...] con le annotazioni del signor Apostolo Zeno istorico e poeta cesareo [...] accresciuta di nuove aggiunte. Vol. II. Parma: Luigi Mussi. pp. 317 ff.
