= Juan Vicente Ribera =

Spanish painter

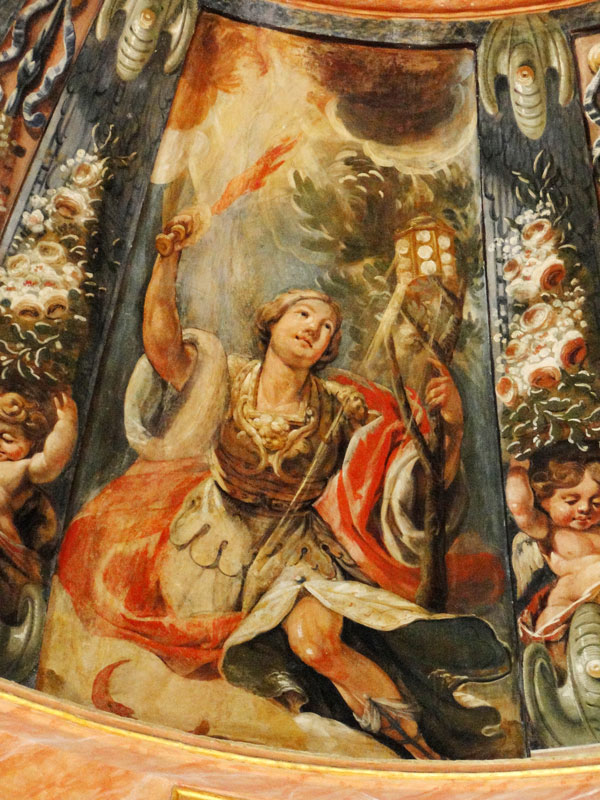
Detail of the dome of the chapel of the Holy Forms in the church of Santa Maria Maggiore in Alcalá de Henares by Juan Vicente Ribera, 1689

Juan Vicente Ribera was a Spanish painter, practicing at Madrid in the early part of the 18th century. He was one of the artists appointed by the Council of Castile in 1725 to tax pictures. He painted the pendentives of the cupola in the church of San Felipe el Real, and painted two scenes from the Life of S. Francis de Paul in the church of la Victoria, and a Martyrdom of S. Justus.
