= Giovanni Battista Lanceni =

Italian painter and engraver

Giovanni Battista Lanceni or Giambattista Lanzani or Lanzeni (after 1659 – 1735) was an Italian painter and engraver of the Baroque period active mainly in Verona.

== Biography ==
By the age of 16 years he had been placed into an apprenticeship under Andrea Voltolini in Verona, from where he moved to work under Francesco Barbieri. He painted in many churches in Verona, including San Procolo, San Zen Maggiore, San Silvestro, San Niccolò (David and the head of Goliath), and San Fermo (Supper at the House of Simon the Pharisee). His daughter (born 1698) became a nun in the monastery of Santa Caterina dalla Ruota. Because she was also a painter, she was nicknamed Suor Michelangela, and in 1718 painted a Santa Caterina debating with the Doctors of Alexandria before the Emperor Maxentius.

Giovanni Battista published in 1720 in Verona a book titled Ricreazione Pittorica in which he describes both his works and a guide to Verona.
