= Caggiano =

- Comune
- Comune di Caggiano
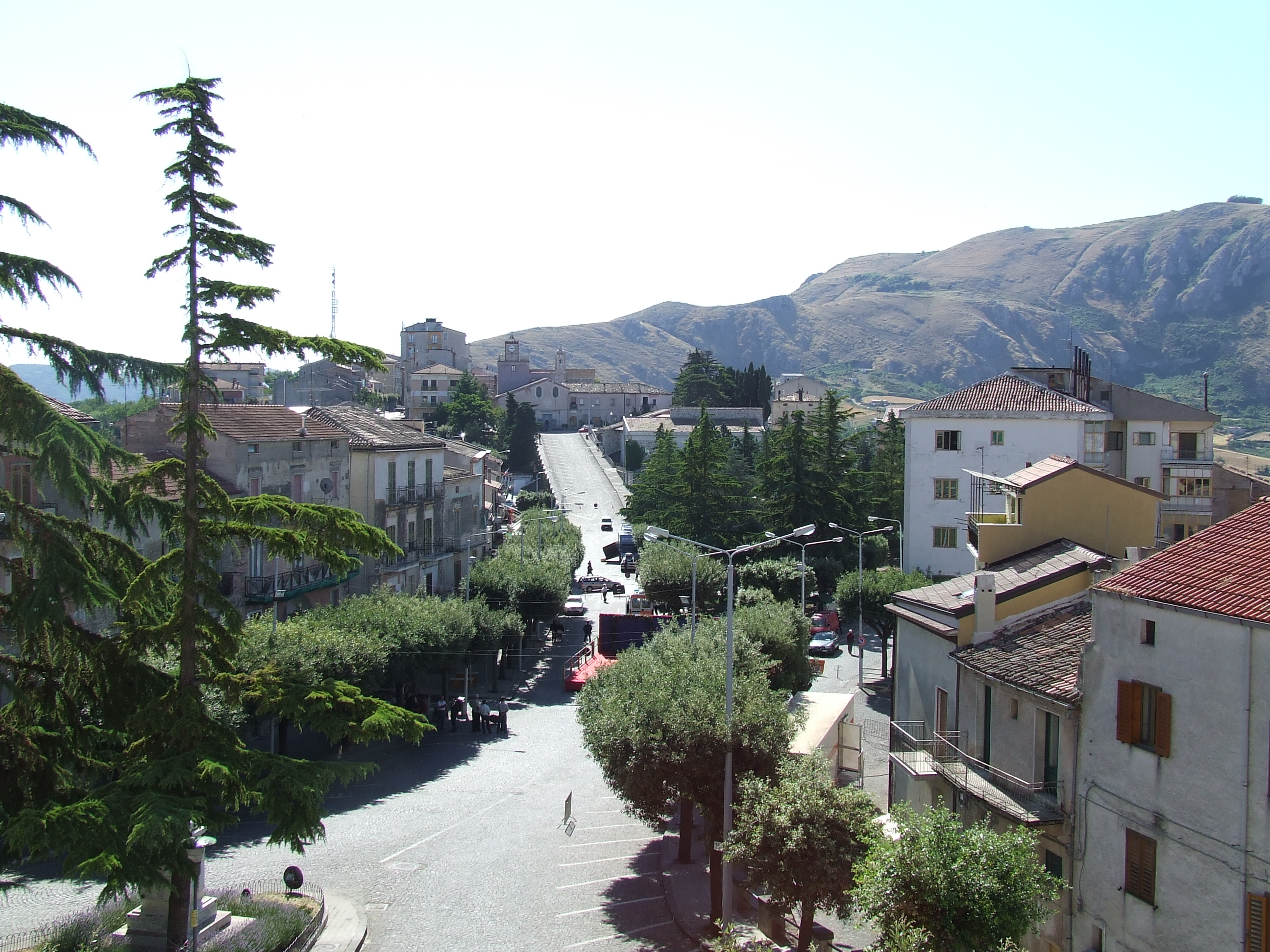

- Coat of arms

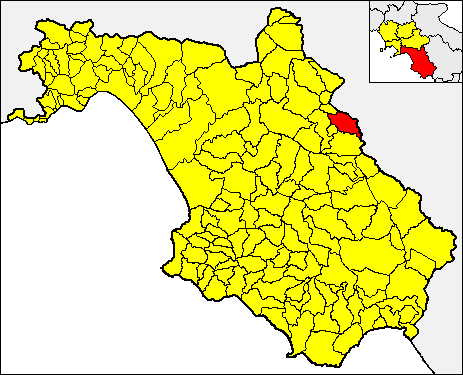
- Caggiano within the Province of Salerno

- Location within Italy Location within Campania
- Coordinates: 40°34′00″N 15°30′00″E
- Country: Italy
- Region: Campania
- Province: Salerno (SA)
- Frazioni: Calabri, Fontana Caggiano I, Mattina, Mattina V, Piedi L'Arma

Government
  - Mayor: Modesto Lamattina

Area
  - Total: 35 km^{2} (14 sq mi)
- Elevation: 828 m (2,717 ft)

Population (1 May 2009)
  - Total: 2,871
  - Density: 82/km^{2} (210/sq mi)
- Demonym: Caggianesi
- Time zone: UTC+1 (CET)
  - Summer (DST): UTC+2 (CEST)
- Postal code: 84030
- Dialing code: 0975
- ISTAT code: 065019
- Patron saint: Sant'Antonio di Padova
- Saint day: 13 June
- Website: Official website

Caggiano is a town and comune in the province of Salerno in the Campania region of south-western Italy.

== Geography ==
Located near the Basilicata region, Caggiano borders the municipalities of Auletta, Pertosa, Polla, Salvitelle, Sant'Angelo Le Fratte (PZ), Savoia di Lucania (PZ) and Vietri di Potenza (PZ). It includes the hamlets (frazioni) of Calabri, Fontana Caggiano I, Mattina, Mattina V, and Piedi L'Arma.

== Gallery ==
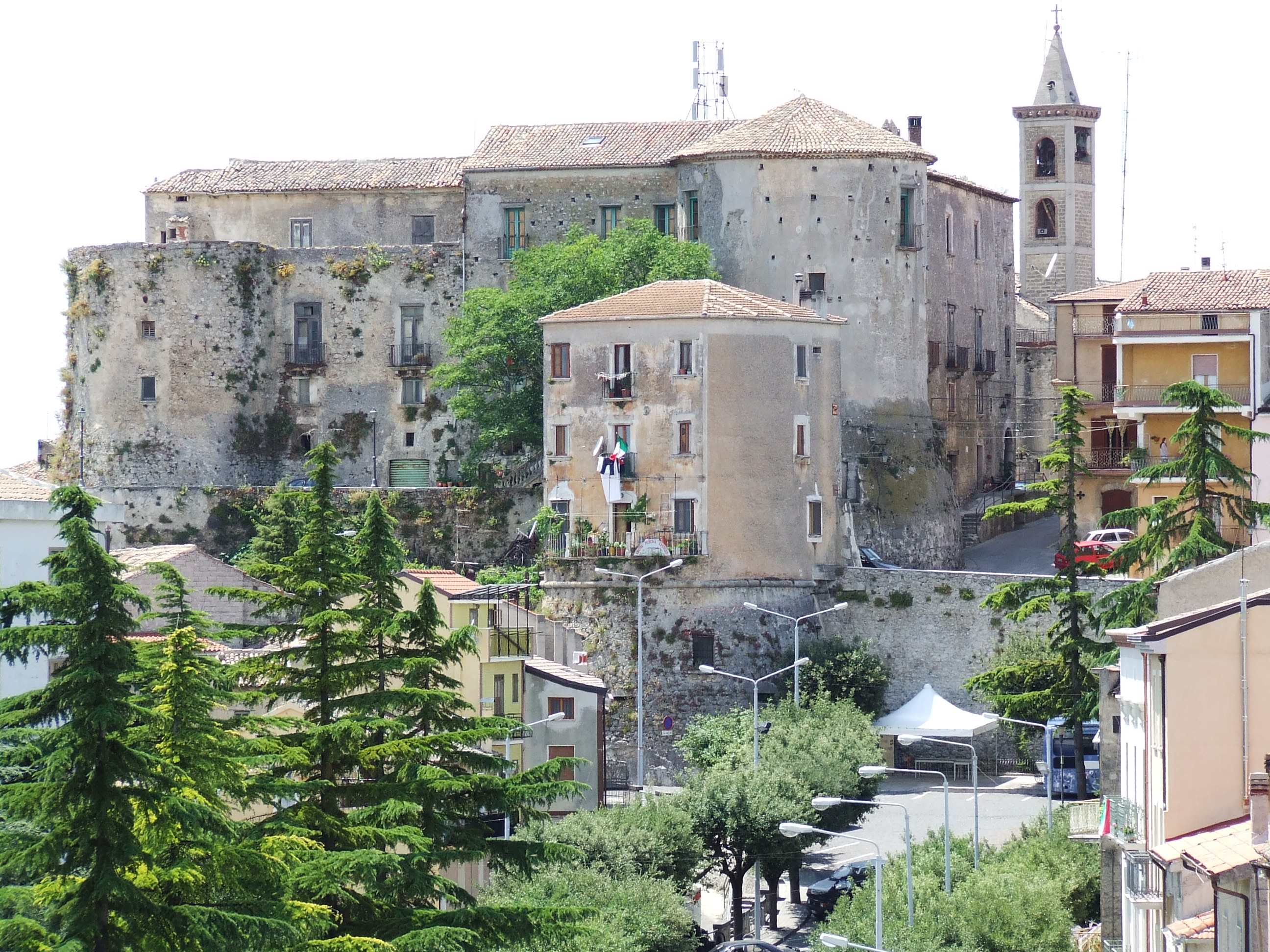
Castle

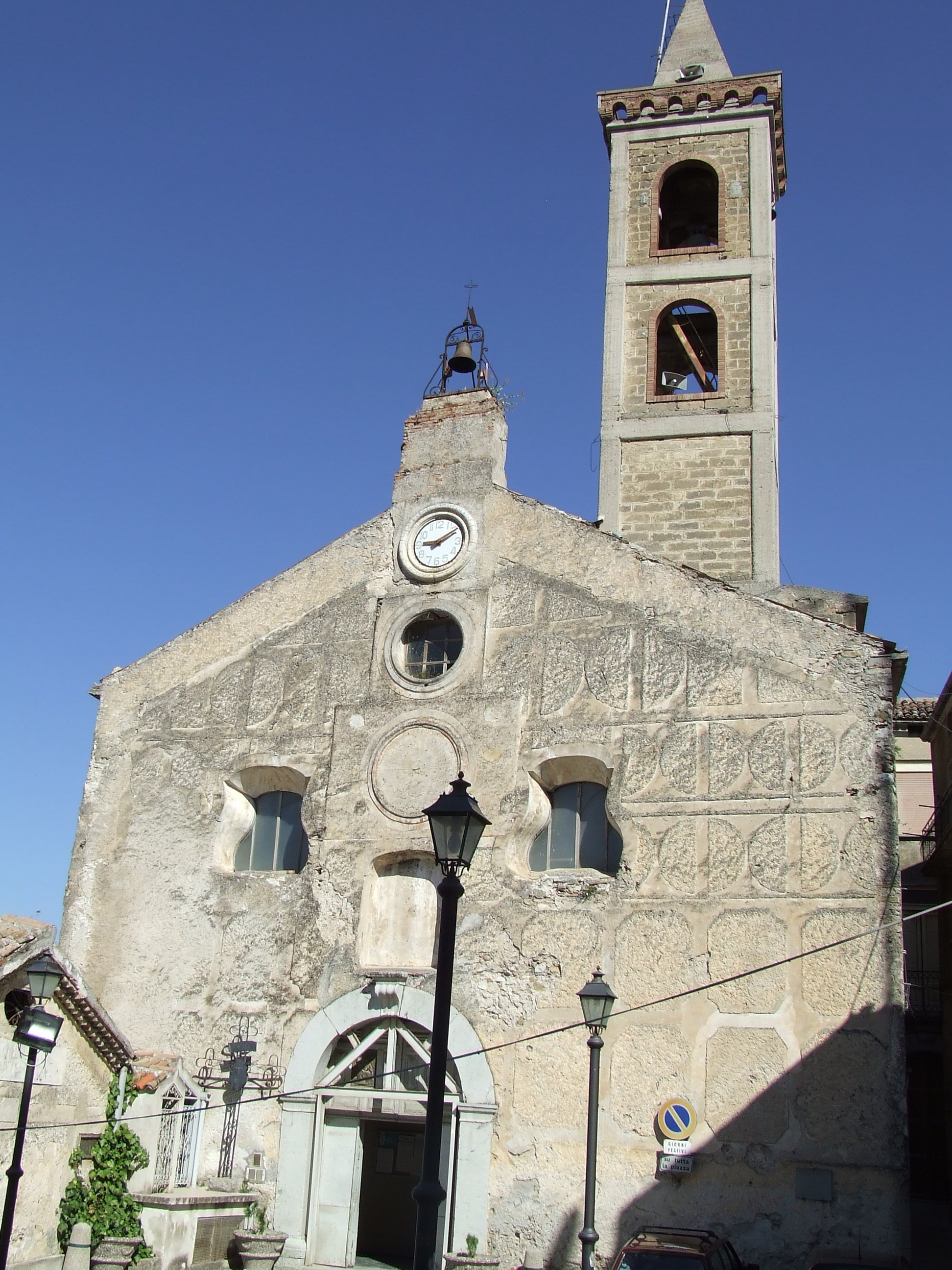
St. Salvatore church

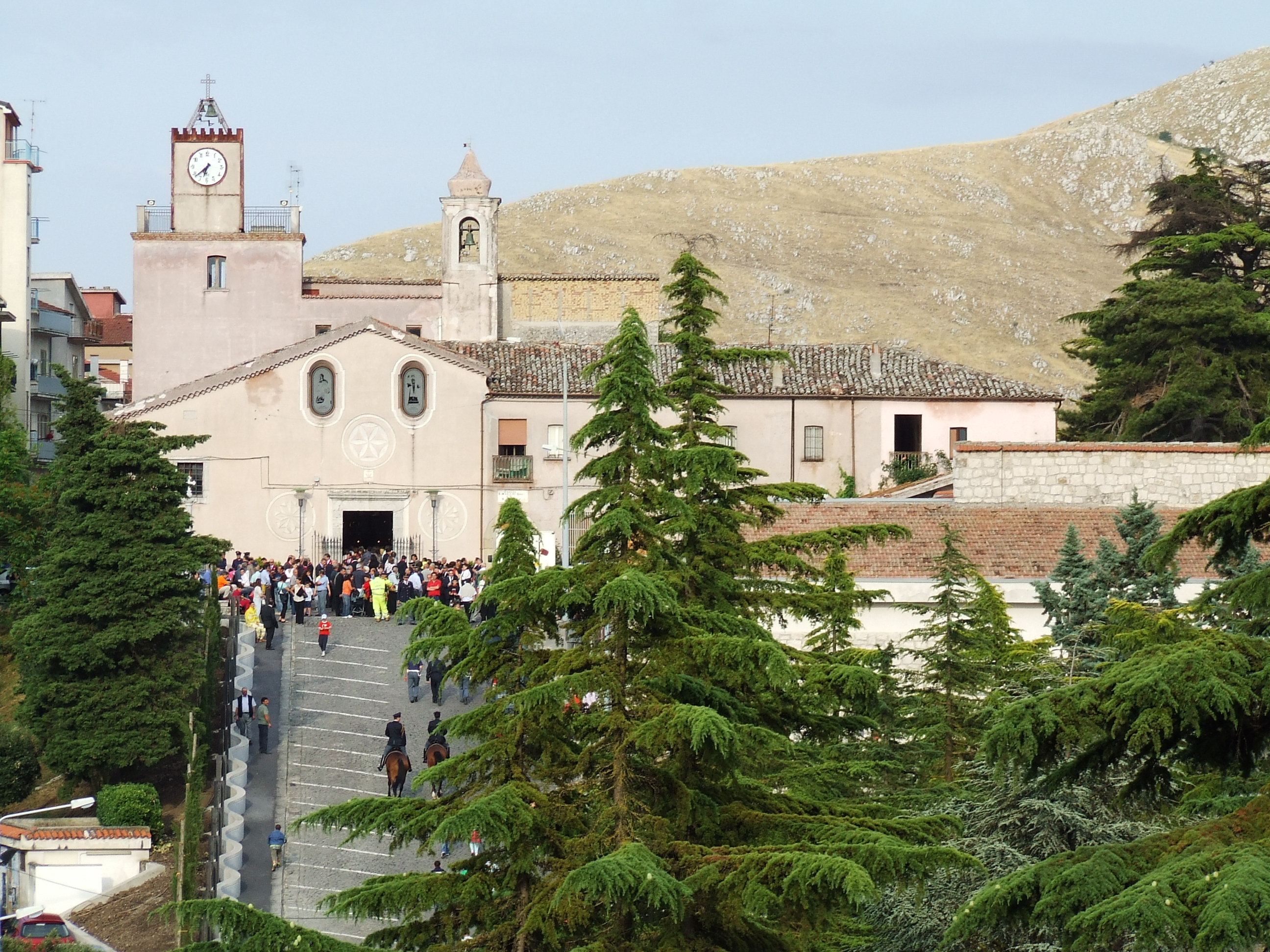
St. Anthony church

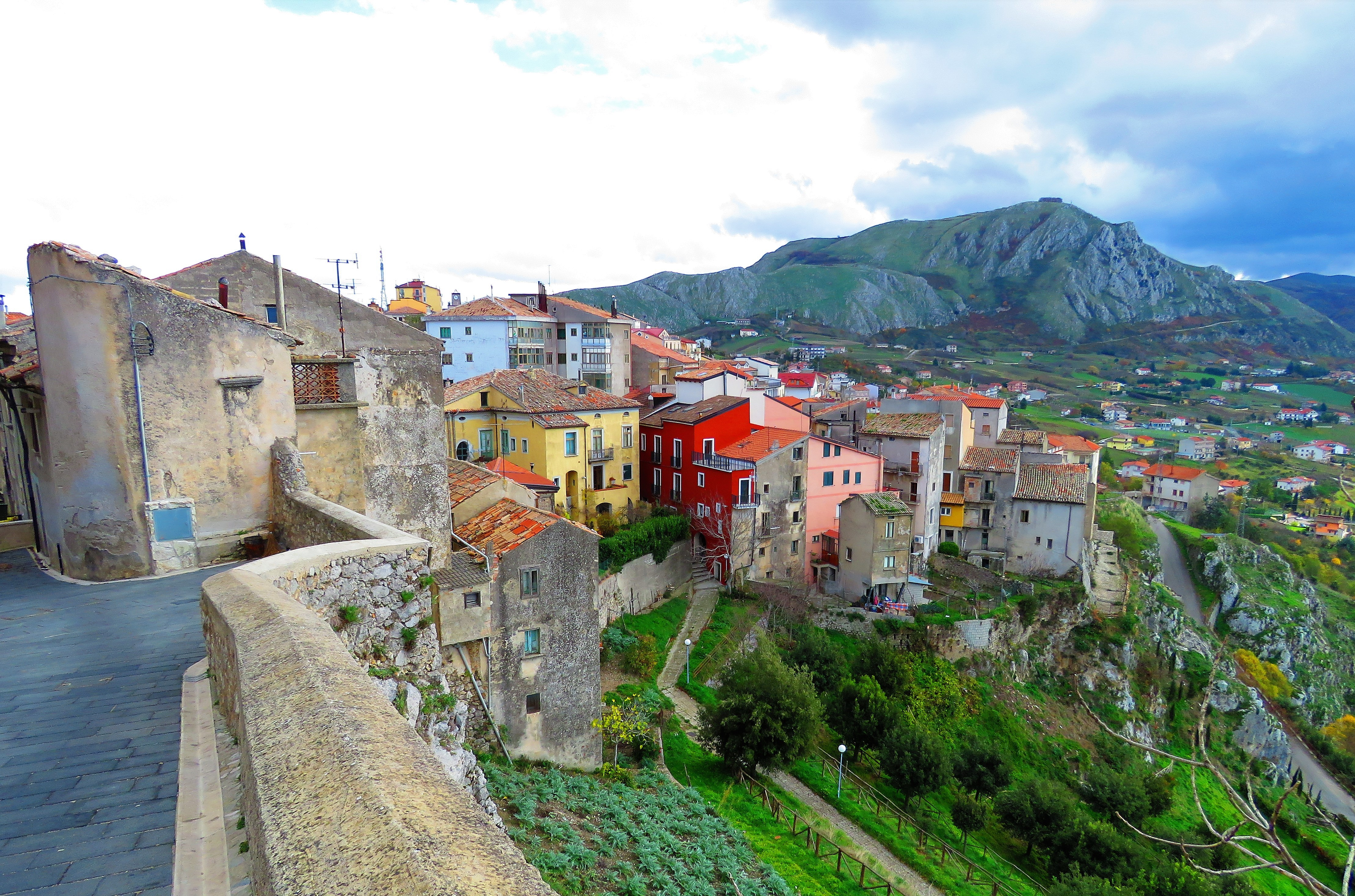
View from the town

== See also ==
- Alburni
- Vallo di Diano
