= Johann Anton de Peters =

German painter

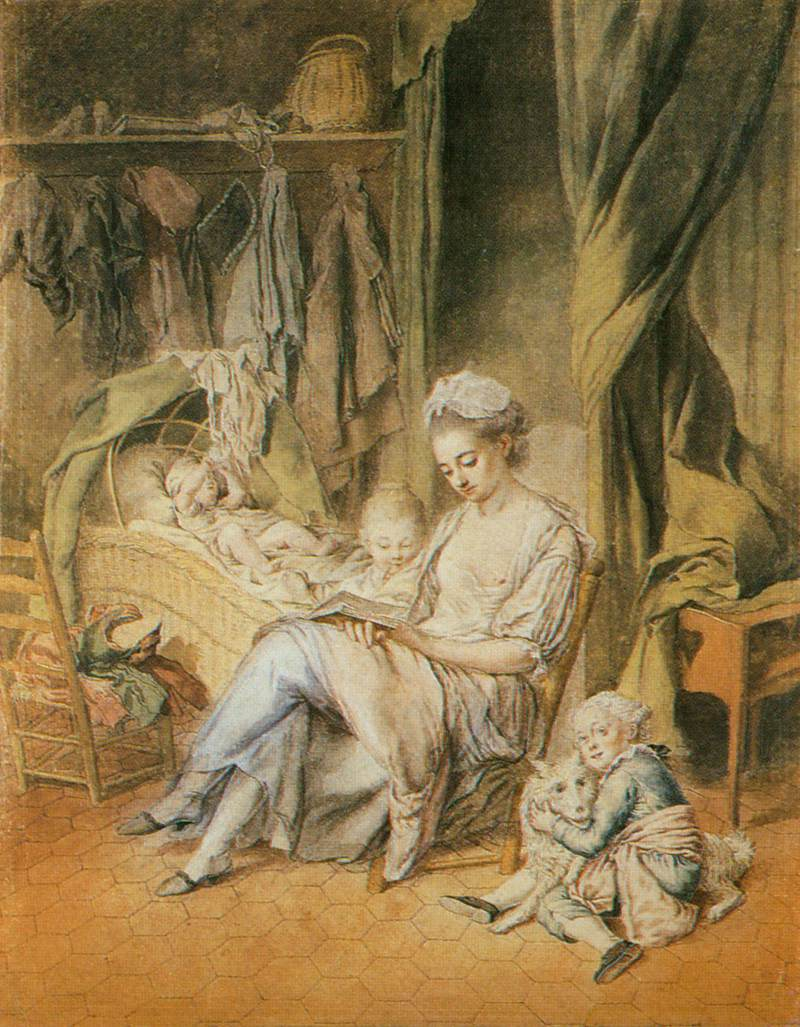
The happy mother, ca. 1775, now in the Wallraf-Richartz Museum

Johann Anton de Peters (16 January 1725 – 6 October 1795) was a German painter and etcher.

Peters was born at Cologne in 1725, and studied in Paris under Greuze. He was raised to the rank of a noble by the king of France, and appointed court painter by the Danish king, Christian VII, as well as by Prince Charles of Lorraine. The Revolution drove him back to his native country, where he lived in poverty, and died at Cologne in 1795. Some paintings by Peters are:

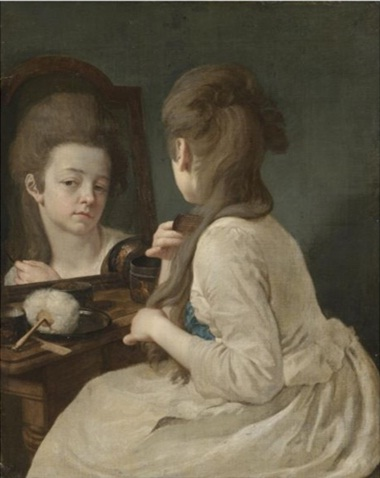
Young lady at her toilet

- Death of Cleopatra (in miniature upon ivory).
- A Girl leaving the Bath (Herr Merlo, Cologne).
- The Girl with the Carp.

Among his etchings are:

- Virgin and Child, in a landscape.
- Holy Family on the Flight to Egypt (after Rembrandt).

== See also ==
- List of German painters
