= Giovanni Girolamo Bonesi =

Italian painter (1653–1725)

Giovanni Girolamo Bonesi (1653–1725) was an Italian painter of the Baroque period.

He was born in Bologna. He was the pupil of the painter Giovanni Maria Viani, but followed the style of Carlo Cignani. He painted a St Francis of Sales kneeling before the Virgin for the church of San Marino; a St Thomas of Villanova giving Alms to the Poor for the church of San Biagio; and a Virgin and Infant Christ, with Mary Magdalene and St Hugo for the Certosa di Bologna.
