= Giuseppe Canale =

Italian painter (1725–1802)

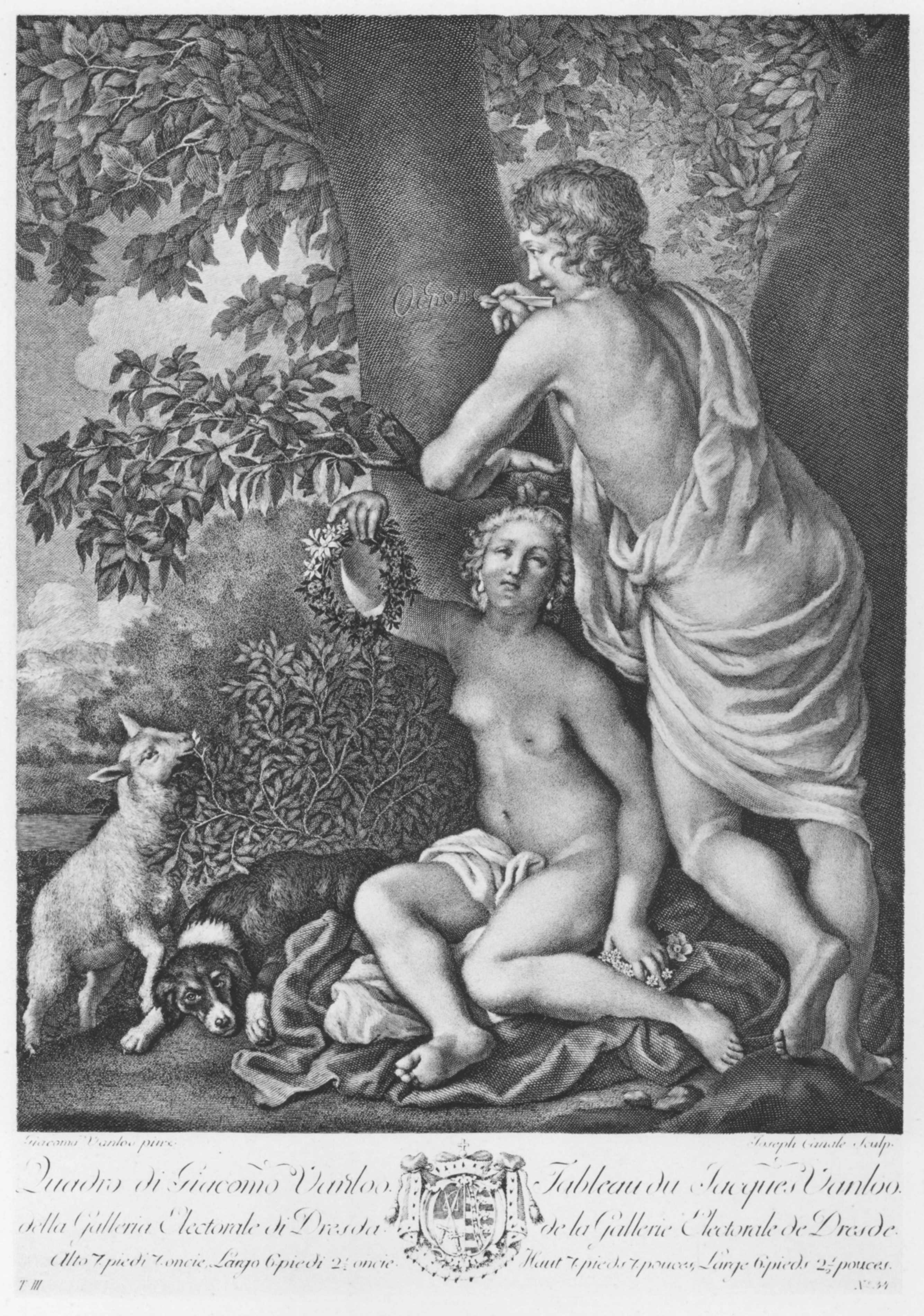
Engraving of Paris and Oenone by Giuseppe Canale, based on the painting by Jacob van Loo, Gemäldegalerie Alte Meister, 1780

Giuseppe Canale (1725–1802) was an Italian designer and engraver. He was born in Rome, the son of Antonio Canale. He was instructed in engraving by Jacob Frey, and also frequented the school of the Cavalière Marco Benefial. In 1751 he was invited to Dresden to assist in engraving plates for the pictures in their Gallery, and was appointed engraver to the Court. He completed the following prints:

- Portrait of Maria Mattia Perini after Benefial
- Portrait of Maria Antonia, Electress Dowager of Saxony after a self-portrait drawing
- Portrait of Archbishop Bonaventura Barberini
- Portrait of Maria Josephina, Queen of Poland
- Portrait of Prince Xavier of Saxony
- Sepulchral Monument of Cardinal Spinola
- Philosopher; after Jusepe Ribera
- The Glory after Domenichino
- Sibyl after Angelica Kauffman
- Paris & Oenone after Van Loo
- Adam and Eve driven from Paradise after Albani
- Christ & St. John after Adrian Van der Werf
- Christ appearing to St. Thomas after Mattia Preti finished by Jacque Firmin Beauvarlet
- Turkish Woman and Spring after Dietrich.

== Sources ==
- Bryan, Michael (1886). Robert Edmund Graves (ed.). Dictionary of Painters and Engravers, Biographical and Critical. Vol. I: A-K. London: George Bell and Sons. p. 224.
