= Pier Francesco Cavazza =

Italian painter and art collector

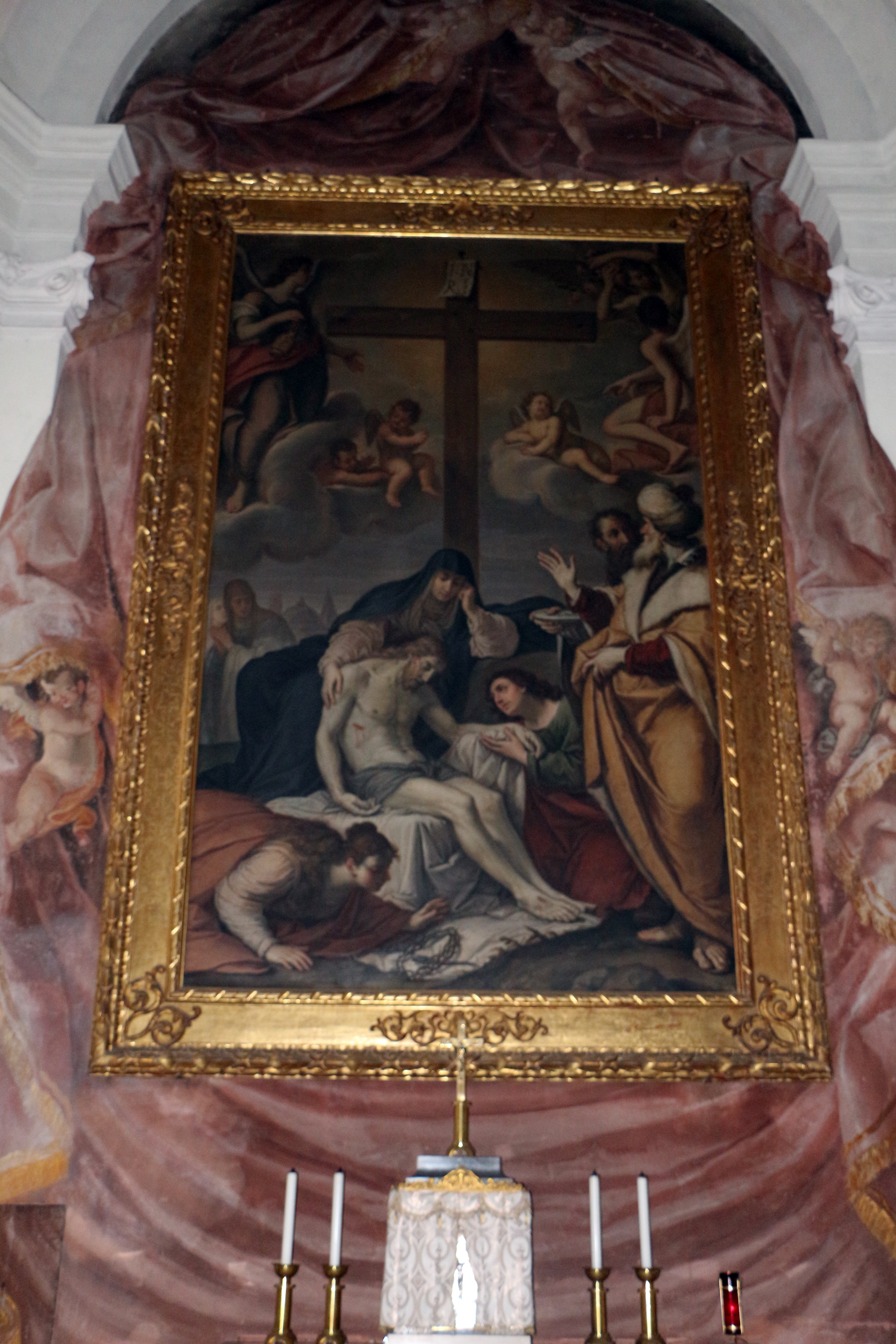
Deposizione, 1712, San Domenico, Bologna

Pier Francesco Cavazza (1675 – 14 October 1755) was an Italian painter and art collector, active in his native Bologna then part of the Papal States.

== History ==
He trained in Bologna under Giovanni Maria Viani, where he was influenced by the works of Guercino. Unlike other Viani pupils, he became less interested in painting, and accumulated a large collection of engravings and drawings. Upon his death, the collection was dispersed. Cavazza died in Bologna.
