= Giovanni Battista Canziani =

Italian painter (1664–1730)

Giovanni Battista Canziani (1664–1730) was an Italian painter of the Baroque style. Born in Verona and died in Rome. He studied with Andrea Voltolino and Giambettino Cignaroli in Verona. Guilty of murder, he fled from Verona to Bologna, and then to Rome where he was best known as a portraitist.
