= Brienza =

- Comune
- Comune di Brienza
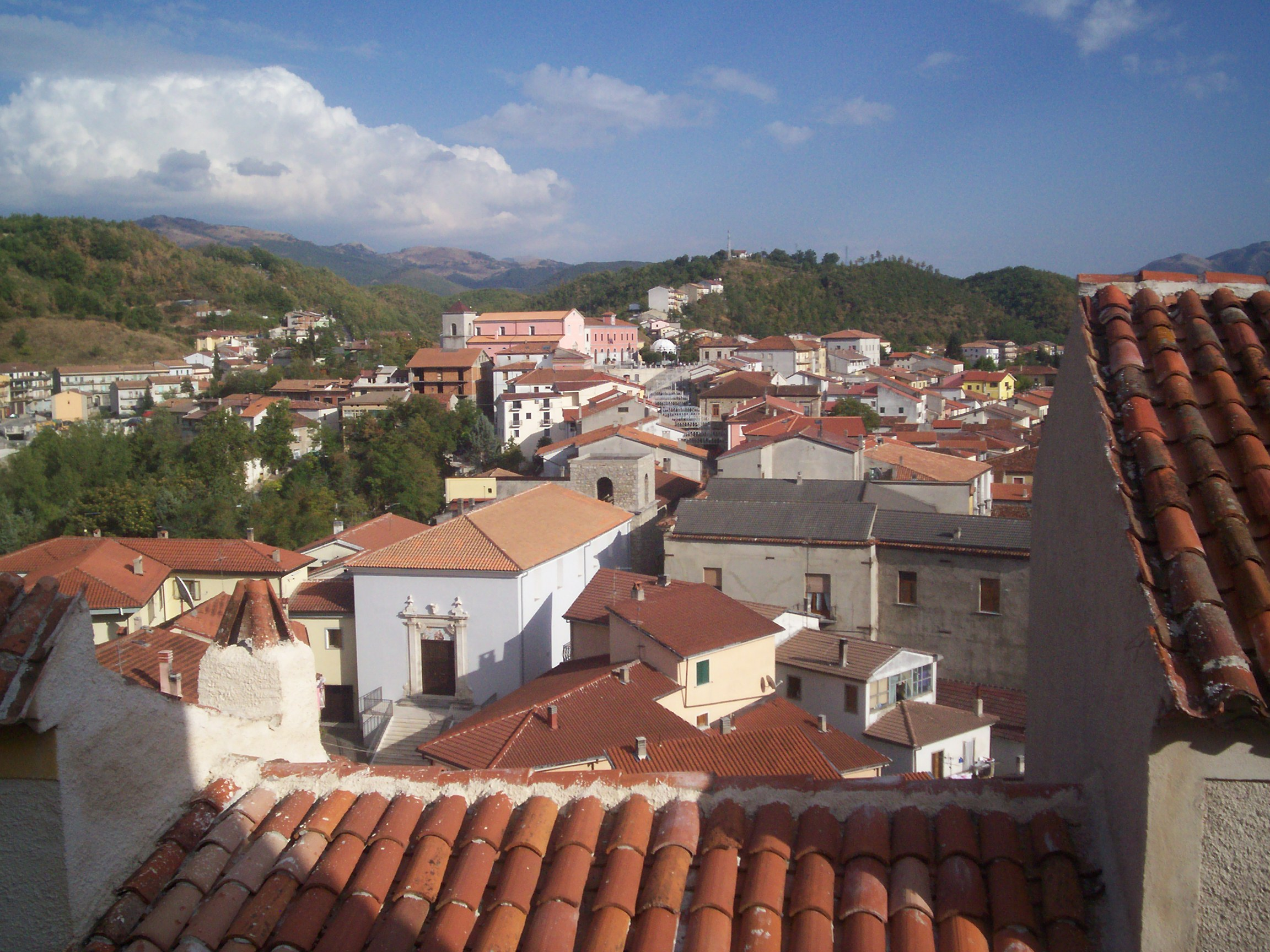
- View of Brienza

- Location within Italy Location within Basilicata
- Coordinates: 40°28′43″N 15°37′47″E
- Country: Italy
- Region: Basilicata
- Province: Potenza (PZ)

Government
  - Mayor: Antonio Giancristiano

Area
  - Total: 82.94 km^{2} (32.02 sq mi)
- Elevation: 706 m (2,316 ft)

Population (30 April 2017)
  - Total: 4,023
  - Density: 48.50/km^{2} (125.6/sq mi)
- Demonym: Burgentini
- Time zone: UTC+1 (CET)
  - Summer (DST): UTC+2 (CEST)
- Postal code: 85050
- Dialing code: 0975
- ISTAT code: 076013
- Patron saint: St. Catald
- Saint day: 10 May
- Website: Official website

Brienza is a town and comune in the province of Potenza, in the Southern Italian region of Basilicata.

== History ==
Brienza was founded around a castle in the 7th century AD, during the Lombard rule of the Duchy of Benevento.

Between the late 19th and early 20th centuries, there was a mass migration of Brienza residents to the Americas, most notably to Buenos Aires, Argentina, and Chicago, in the United States. The Brienza immigrants in Argentina settled in the Mataderos (Nueva Chicago) neighborhood of Buenos Aires. The Argentine community retains a cultural affinity with Brienza through Asociacion Italiana Brienza.

== Main sights ==
Caracciolo's Castle on top of a rocky spur dominates the Melandro valley. It dates from the Angevin rule in the Kingdom of Naples; now only a ruin, rises sheer from the river Pergola. Restored since the 20th century, the manor retains fragments of its original flooring and two statues; it is now used for cultural events.

== People ==
Mario Pagano, a philosopher, politician, lawyer, was born in Brienza on 8 December 1748.

== Cuisine ==
Lucanian Caciocavallo Podolico is one of the most characteristic cheeses of Basilicata. It is only produced with whole milk from the Podolic breed of cow which feeds mainly in the pastures. The Podolic breed is reared in the wild throughout the southern Apennine mountains. In the Basilicata region the cheese is produced in the province of Potenza (at Brienza, Forenza, Viggiano, Atella, San Fele, Calvello, Pescopagano, Pietrapertosa, Tolve and Lagonegro), and in the province of Matera (at Accettura, Salandra, Stigliano and Ferrandina).

For some time now a process has been undertaken with the purpose, of achieving the European Dop mark for Lucanian Caciocavallo Podolico and which has already led to the drafting of production regulations. Lucanian Caciocavallo Podolico is a stringy cheese. The milk, which comes entirely from the morning's milking, must be processed within 24 hours.

The whole process and the seasoning are governed by strict regulations. The cheeses are characteristically pear-shaped, hung “by the neck” between the roof beams to mature. The bouquet is that of rosemary and heather.
