= The Feast in the House of Simon the Pharisee =

The Feast in the House of Simon the Pharisee may refer to:

- The Feast in the House of Simon the Pharisee (Romanino), a c. 1545 oil on canvas painting, in Brescia
- The Feast in the House of Simon the Pharisee (Rubens), a c. 1618–1620 painting by Peter Paul Rubens, in the Hermitage Museum, St. Petersburg
- The Feast in the House of Simon the Pharisee (Veronese, Milan), a 1570 oil-on-canvas painting by Paolo Veronese, in the Pinacoteca di Brera
- The Feast in the House of Simon the Pharisee (Veronese, Turin), a c. 1565 oil-on-canvas painting, in the Galleria Sabauda
