= Orlando Flacco =

Italian painter

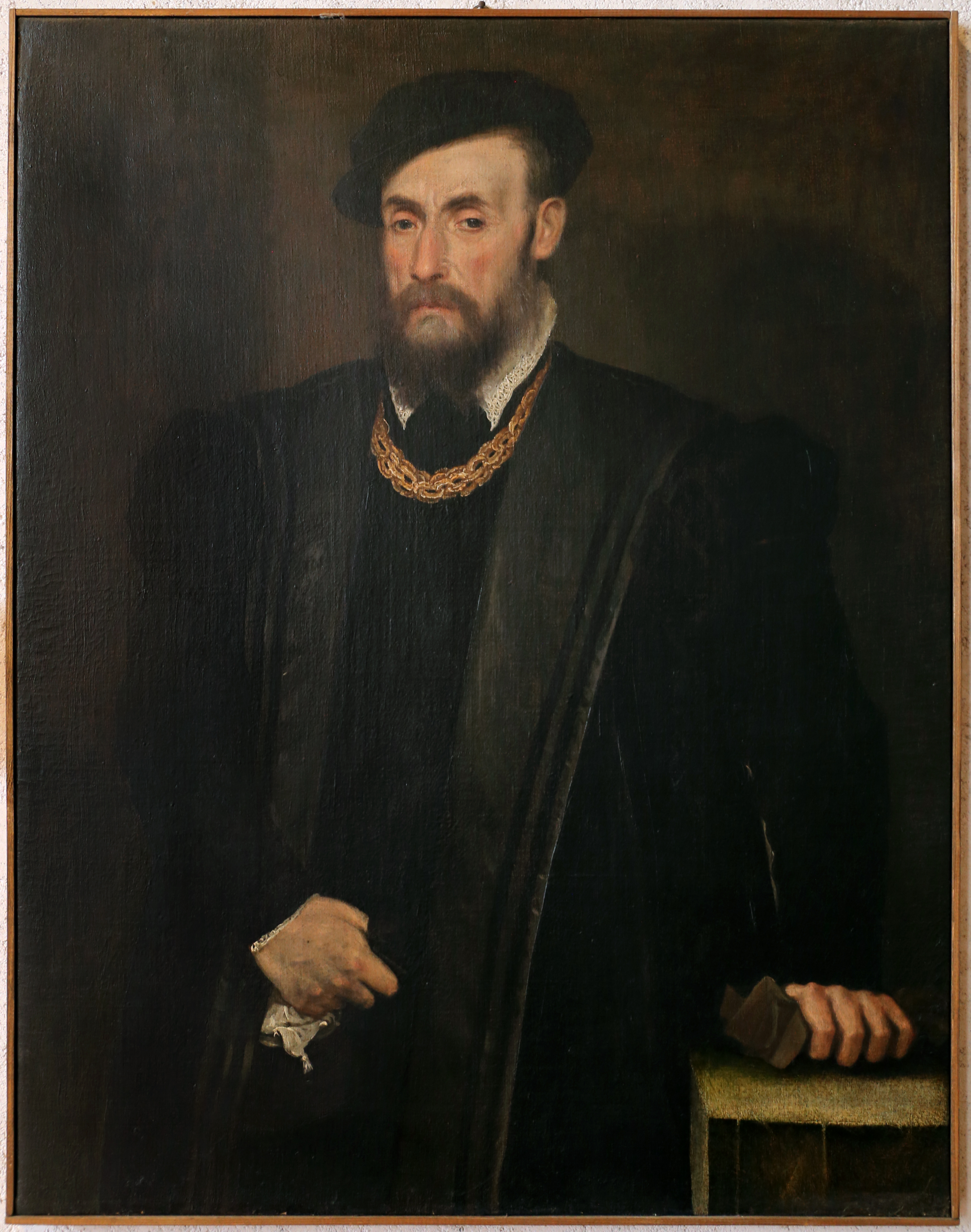
Portrait of a man

Orlando Flacco or Fiacco (fl. 1560) was an Italian artist.

== Life ==
Flacco, a native of Verona, was a painter who flourished about 1560. He a pupil of Francesco Torbido, known as Il Moro. His style much resembles that of Badile. Vasari praises his portraits, and Lanzi says that his forms resemble those of Caravaggio. He painted a Crucifixion and an Ecce Homo in the church of Santi Nazaro e Celso in Verona.
