= Badile =

Badile may refer to:

- Antonio Badile (c. 1518–1560), an Italian painter from Verona
- Piz Badile, a mountain in Switzerland/Italy
