= Santi Nazaro e Celso, Verona =

Church in Verona, Italy

Santi Nazaro e Celso
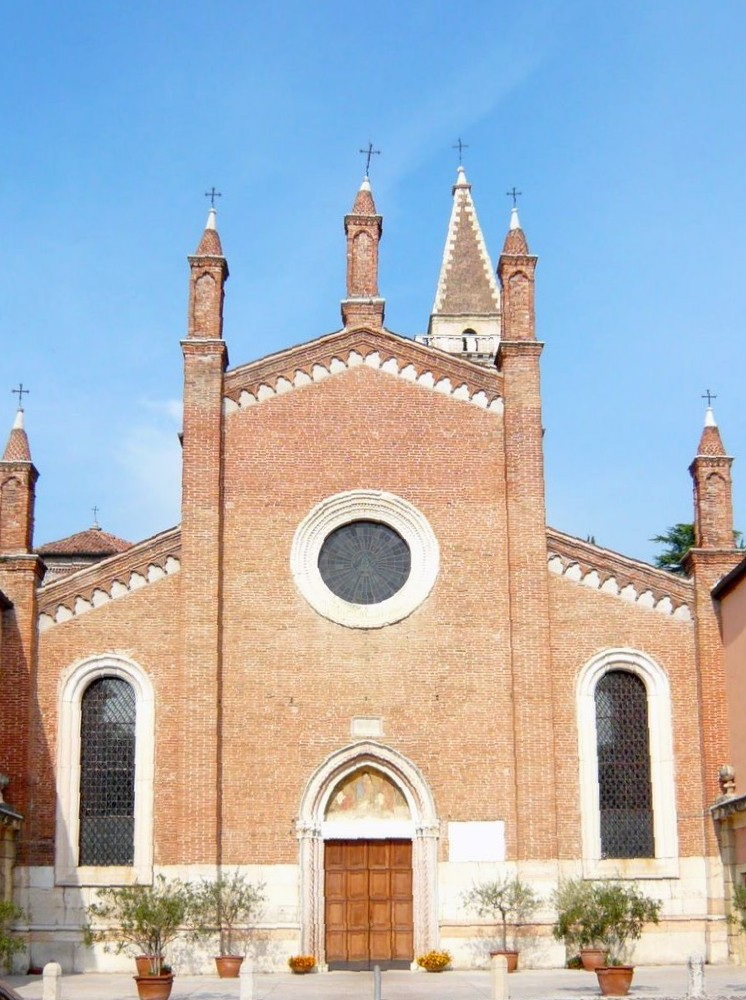

- Location within Veneto

Religion
- Affiliation: Roman Catholic
- Province: Veneto
- Patron: Nazarius and Celsus
- Year consecrated: 1483

Location
- Location: Verona, Italy
- Coordinates: 45°26′27.90″N 11°00′31.90″E

Architecture
- Type: Church
- Style: Gothic architecture (facade, exterior and San Biagio Chapel) and Renaissance architecture (interior)
- Groundbreaking: October 13, 1464
- Completed: April 6, 1466

The Church of Saints Nazarius and Celsus (Italian: Chiesa dei Santi Nazaro e Celso) is a Catholic place of worship in Verona located in the Veronetta district, on the road leading to Porta Vescovo. Its origin can be traced to around the 7th century when an early, simple monastic building that was built in the Lombard era was erected at the foot of the overlooking Mount Castiglione. Part of this shrine, originally dedicated to St. Michael the Archangel, still survives with its frescoes and mosaic floors. It was probably a martyrion dedicated to the veneration of the relics of Saints Nazarius and Celsus.

Next to this first building was a church built by the monks during the Lombard rule, perhaps in the Romanesque style, of which nothing remains today except evidence of its existence in the Versus de Verona (late 8th century) and in the Raterian iconography (first half of the 10th century). The first archival mention of the attached monastic community dates from a document of 1035, while later sources report a developing monastery thanks to some beneficia. With a diploma of May 24, 1111, it came under the direct protection of Emperor Henry V in a true vassal-like relationship. In the 13th century Ezzelino III da Romano, who had recently arrived in Verona, stripped the community of monks of their vast possessions and exiled the abbot, as he was concerned about his growing power and aversion. With the subsequent advent of the Scaligeri, the monastery regained its properties but was prevented from reasserting its former political power. After more than a century of decline, in 1444 Pope Eugene IV arranged for the Benedictine community of Verona to be united with the wealthier abbey of Santa Giustina in Padua: this gave the monks a new impetus that enabled them in 1464 to demolish the earlier Romanesque church and begin construction of the present building, the consecration of which took place on January 19, 1483. In 1767 the Benedictine monastery was suppressed and the property acquired by the Venetian Republic, only to be partly handed over four years later to the Benedictine nuns of San Daniele, who made some restorations. Napoleon's edict of 1810 permanently dissolved the monastery, which was demolished to make way for the church.

The present building was constructed in a mixture of Gothic and Renaissance styles. The portal, set in a simple facade, is reached by crossing the parvis, enclosed by a high wall that separates it from the street. The interior is divided into three aisles, leading to a transept that stands between the nave and the chancel. On the side of each aisle are five altars, each of which is enriched by the presence of an altarpiece surmounted by a lunette, painted by famous Veronese painters, including Antonio Badile, Orlando Flacco, Battista del Moro, and Domenico Brusasorzi. The presbytery vault and the apsidal basin were frescoed by Paolo Farinati, who also created the two canvases placed on either side of the choir. At the end of the right arm of the transept is the Chapel of St. Blaise, completed in 1508 to house the relics of the martyrs St. Blaise and St. Juliana, who were brought there in 1174. The chapel is richly decorated with a pictorial cycle on which Falconetto, Domenico and Francesco Morone, Paolo Morando, Bartolomeo Montagna, Francesco Bonsignori, Girolamo dai Libri, and Moretto, among others, worked.

== History ==
=== Origin: the martyrion of St. Michael ===
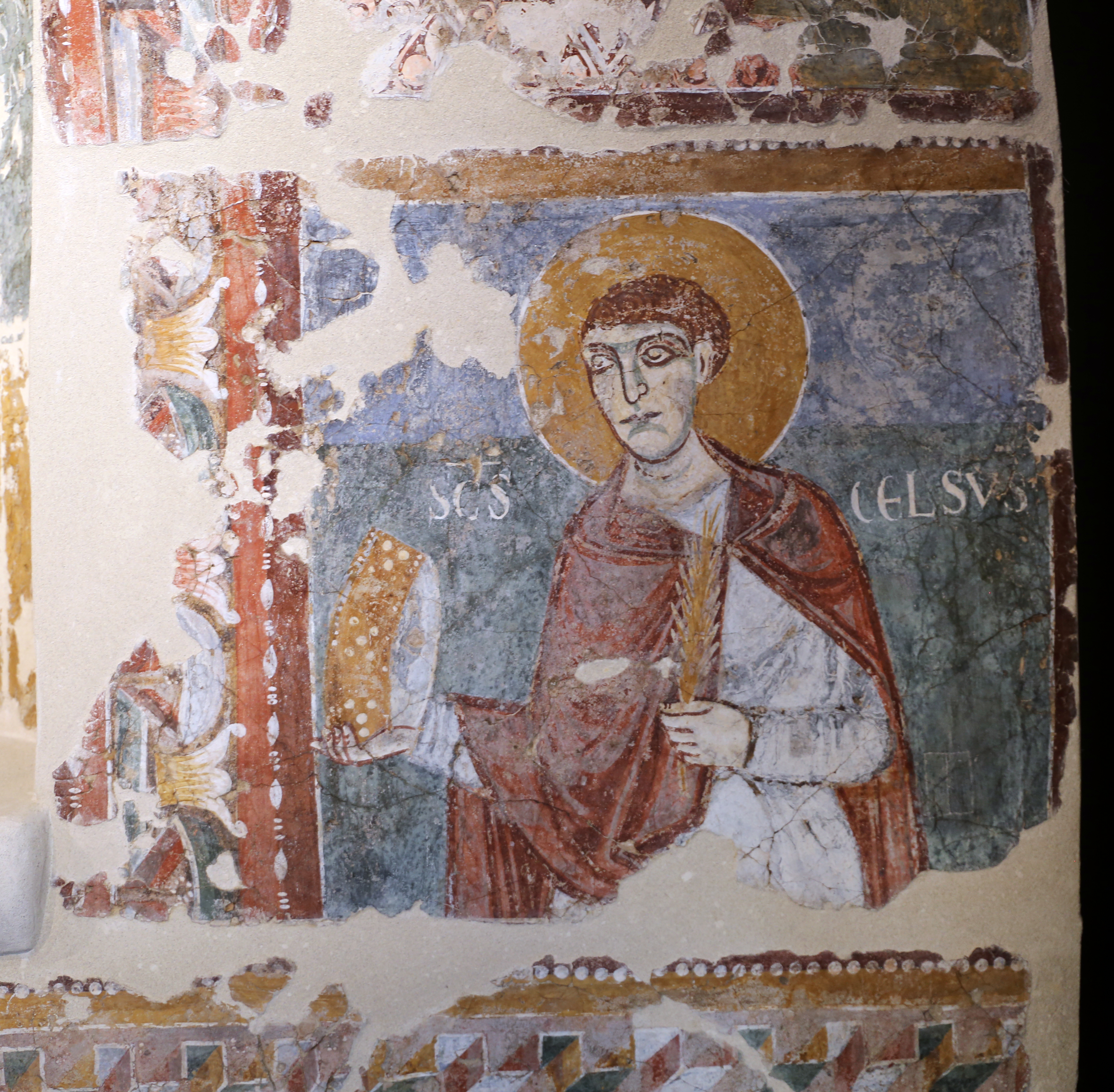
Second layer of the frescoes on the wall of the sacellum of Saints Nazarius and Celsus (now at the G.B. Cavalcaselle Museum of Frescoes)

The present building dates from the 15th century but is only the latest in a series of religious buildings that followed one another over the centuries. The origin of the church of Saints Nazarius and Celsus is very ancient and can be traced back to the construction of an early, simple building at the foot of Mount Castiglione, in whose tuff the apse was excavated, and originally dedicated to St. Michael the Archangel. It was probably a martyrion dedicated to the veneration of the relics of Saints Nazarius and Celsus and dating from the early Christian era, between the 6th and 7th centuries, at the dawn of Christianity. In addition to the apse, this building consisted of a dark cruciform masonry hallway with a transept and barrel-vaulted roof. The walls were decorated with cycles of frescoes in overlapping layers from various periods, some of which were detached in 1881 and moved to the former church of San Francesco al Corso at the Giovanni Battista Cavalcaselle Fresco Museum, while parts of the mosaic floors remain in place. A rudimentary monastery must have stood next to this martyrion.

According to reconstructions by Carlo Cipolla, this sacellum (also referred to by some as a "grotto" or "chapel") was deeply damaged by the Hungarian invasions and in particular during the one of 933, only to be restored at the behest of the bishop of Verona Otberto, who also sponsored the creation of the frescoes. Cipolla deduces this thanks to an inscription from 996 found on the site and now lost, which read, "ANN. AB INCARNC dNi NRI DCCCCXCVI. INDIC X.” However, the two layers of plaster found suggest that additional ones were added to the early ancient frescoes that can be dated around 1180.

=== Late medieval period: early Romanesque building ===
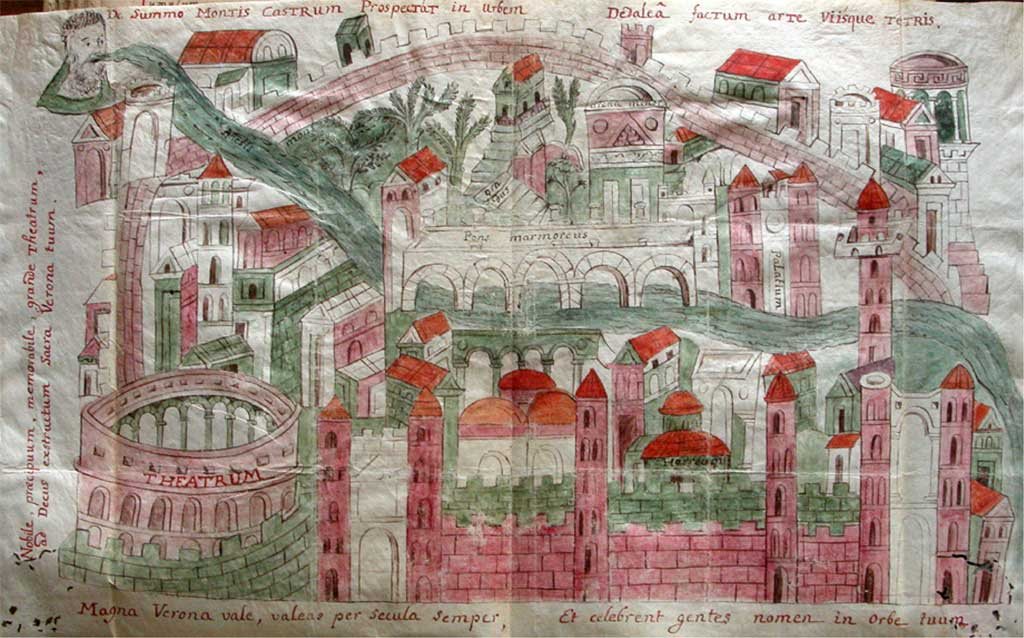
Raterian iconography, the earliest visual representation of Verona (first half of the 10th century); the early church of Saints Nazarius and Celsus is visible

No documents have come down about the early medieval monastic building, but the religious complex is mentioned in the Versus de Verona, a poem from the late 8th century, and is clearly recognizable in the so-called Raterian iconography, the oldest graphic representation of Verona, made by Bishop Ratherius around the first half of the 10th century.

In the early 11th century, the gradual increase in population prompted the Benedictine monks to promote the construction of a new building larger than the previous one. This initiative was completed during the last years of the episcopate of Bishop Giovanni, while its first abbot was a certain Mauro. In all likelihood this church was to be set on a traditional five-nave basilica plan and was to respect the characteristics of Romanesque architecture, but nothing more is known, just as nothing is known about the establishment of the Benedictine community on the site. The first known mention of the existence of the Benedictine monastic community attached to the church, in fact, dates back to a document of 1035 in which it is stated that the abbot at that time was the aforementioned Mauro. Subsequent sources report of a monastery that was clearly growing thanks to the attribution of a number of beneficia in the province (Note: These benefices covered several properties in Lavagno, Mezzane, Illasi and Garda. In particular, in 1037, Bishop Giovanni with a diploma donated some estates near Coriano, Rivalta, Vighizzolo and Gazzo: "Ego Joannes quamvis indignus divina tamen disponente gratia episcopali… et per hanc meam concessionem ibidem disposui confirmari, videlicet Corlianum cum omni iure, Rivalta, Graziolo, villa Vigizolo seu vinei vel terris dominibus quoque tam infra civitatem positis... anno dominacae incarnationis millesimo trigesimo septimo. Indicione quinta." In Biancolini (1723, Book I, p. 263) and in Dal Forno (1982, p. 21).) granted by the bishops who succeeded one another at the head of the Veronese diocese.

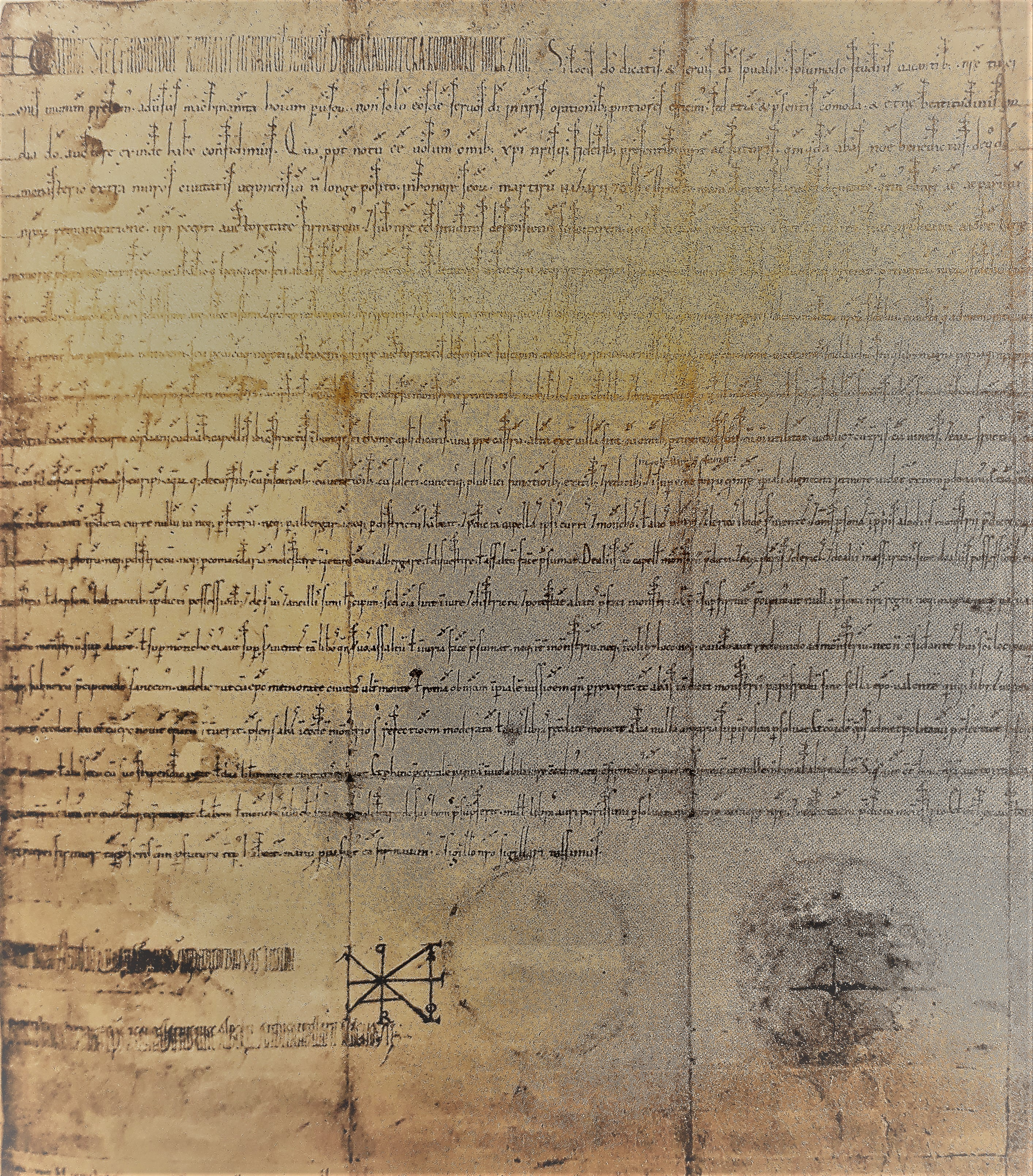
Imperial diploma issued on May 24, 1111 by Emperor Henry V by which he placed the monastery under his protection

With a diploma of May 24, 1111, the monastery came under the direct protection of Emperor Henry V: this act specified how no other authority, including the bishop, could claim any jurisdictional power over it and its property; it also gave the abbot the power to administer justice, both civil and criminal, in a true vassal-like relationship. This relationship was confirmed by certain obligations on the part of the abbot that, though little more than formal, were typical of this legal position. Among other obligations were that of celebrating one mass a day for the emperor and twelve on the anniversary of his departure, and providing a horse for the Veronese bishop whenever he had to move at the will of the emperor. The abbot also had the power to appoint knights and militia and thus to establish his own militia to defend the monastery.

A papal bull issued by Adrian IV on May 30, 1158 confirmed the monastery, then ruled by Abbot Clement, its privileges and assured papal protection. At that time the monastery possessed a hostel and a hospital, in which a German baron named Boniface, part of Emperor Frederick Barbarossa's retinue in what would go down in history as the Third Crusade, was housed on December 3, 1174. Boniface died shortly thereafter, but before he died he decided to pay homage to the abbot who had assisted him, Father Adriano, of the bodies of the martyrs St. Blaise and St. Juliana that he had stolen from the Holy Land. The monks decided to temporarily store the precious relics under the high altar.

By the next century, the monastery had acquired such wealth and power that it led Ezzelino III da Romano, who had recently arrived in Verona, to order the exile of Abbot Bonifacio, who was considered politically adverse, and to confiscate the abbey's vast possessions. The monks had to wait for Mastino I della Scala's rise to power to regain their possessions, but the Scaliger lordship avoided giving him any political power.

The 15th century was marked by a profound decline of the monastery, both in terms of its financial resources and the number of monks, which inexorably decreased. The efforts of Abbot Bartolomeo Mazzetti, who died in 1442, and of the benefits granted by Pope Martin V with the bull of January 11, 1419, were to no avail. In 1444 Pope Eugene IV ordered that the monastery of Saints Nazarius and Celsus be united with the prestigious abbey of Santa Giustina in Padua, which enjoyed far greater fortunes.

=== The construction of the present building ===
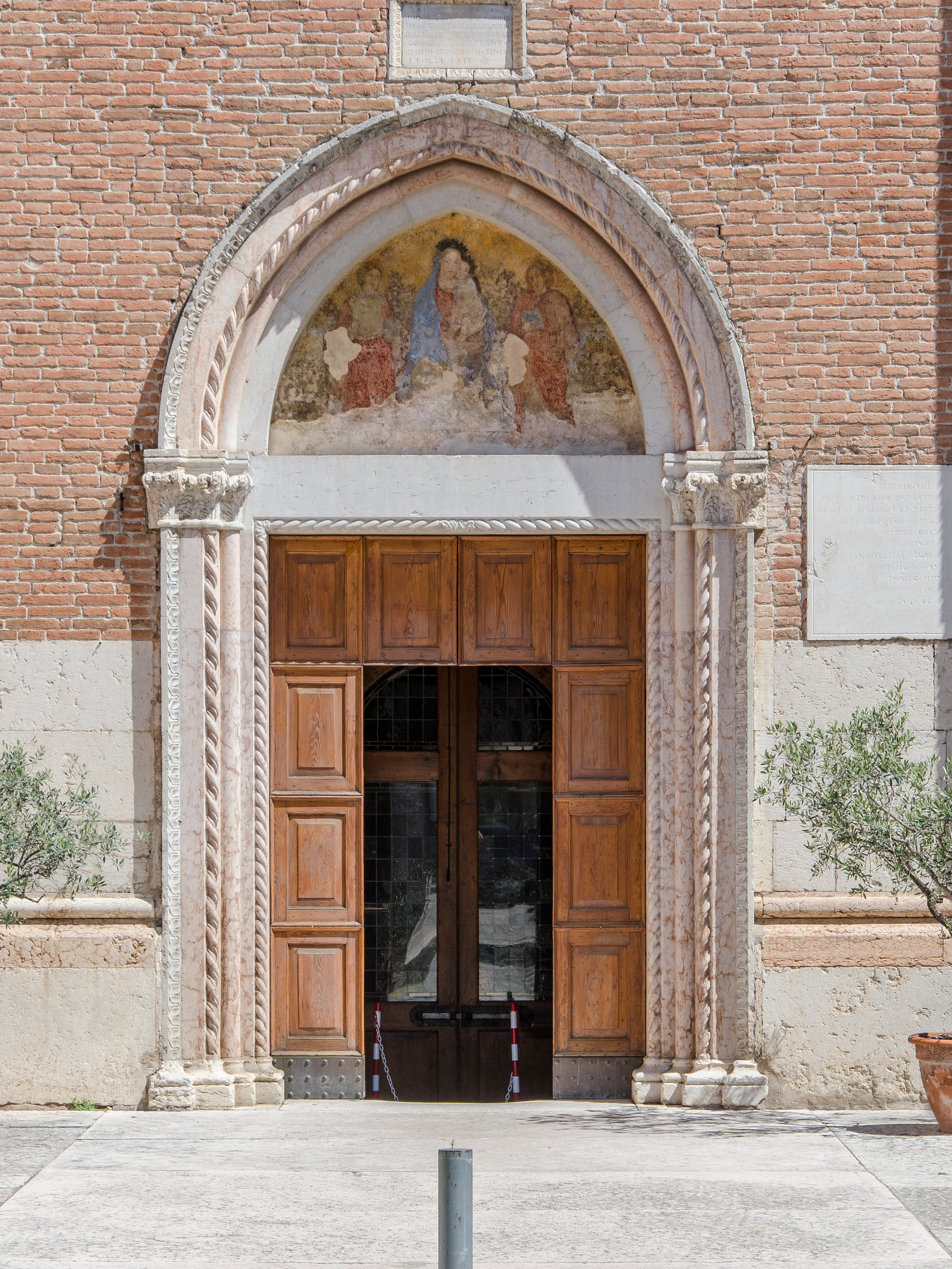
The portal of the present church, with the inscription above it, testifying to the date of the construction of the walls of the building

The union with the Paduan abbey gave new strength to the monastery, so much so that around the second half of the 15th century the construction of the present building proceeded. The beginning of the work, recorded in an inscription above the entrance portal of the facade, took place on October 15, 1464, shortly after the demolition of the previous Romanesque building. At that time, Guglielmo da Milano held the position of abbot. According to what is documented on the inscription, the work on the exterior walls was completed on April 6, 1466, (Note: The text of the inscription is as follows: "CAPXH // III. ID . OCTOBRIS // MCCCCLXIIII // .DISCE . VTRVNQVE .SIMVL . GRAE // CO. SVB . GRAMATE . TEMPVS . // . ID . MIHI . PRINCIPVM .FINIS . // ET . ILLE . FVIT . // TEVOS // VIII. ID. APRILIS // MCCCCLXVI.") however, the finishing work continued for about twenty years, during which times of interruption and resumption alternated. The opening for worship took place on January 19, 1483 in the presence of Abbot Gianfrancesco, Archbishop Marco Cattaneo of Durrës, vicar of the Verona bishop, and Cardinal Giovanni Michiel, who proceeded with the consecration.

The new construction was an opportunity to find a worthy location for the relics of the martyrs that had arrived from the Holy Land, which were greatly venerated by the people of Verona. It was therefore decided to entrust Beltrame Jarola (known as Beltramo da Valsolda) with the construction of a dedicated chapel; work began on March 7, 1488, with Girolamo da Piacenza at the head of the monastery. The following year a confraternity, called “di San Biagio,” was established and given the task of financing and overseeing the building. The chapel, in the Renaissance style and located at the end of the left arm of the transept, was completed twenty years later, and on April 24, 1508, the sacred relics were moved there. However, the consecration had already taken place on July 30, 1491.

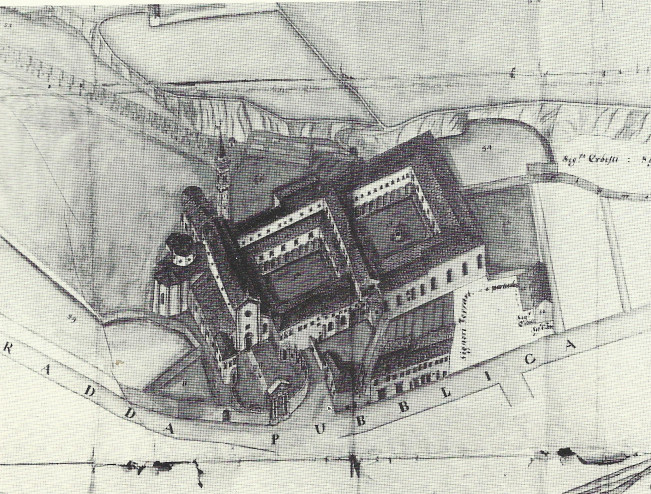
The church of Saints Nazarius and Celsus in a drawing from the early 1700s. Note the buildings that made up the monastery, of which little remains today

In addition to these important events related to the building, in the same years the monastery was able to benefit from new benefits: on April 2, 1498 Pope Alexander VI gave it the jurisdiction of the Benedictine abbey of Badia Calavena; Bishop Marco Corner granted it the title of parish with a baptismal font; and finally Pope Paul IV subjected it to the parish of Santa Maria di Tregnago. The newfound economic prosperity allowed the monastery to build the present bell tower, to make some interventions in the interior and to commission the painter Paolo Veronese to paint The Feast in the House of Simon the Pharisee, to be placed in the refectory (now exhibited in the Savoy Gallery). Several works were carried out in the second half of the 16th century, including the lengthening of the chancel and the covering of the choir and the chancel itself by vaults that would later be frescoed by Paolo Farinati in 1575.

The devastating plague epidemic that struck much of Europe in 1630 did not spare the monastery, which lost almost all of its monks. Restoration of the rectory was undertaken in 1736. At the behest of the Venetian government, the Benedictine monastery was finally suppressed in 1767, and the property acquired by the Venetian Republic; four years later, by a deed notarized on October 28 and for the sum of 14,500 ducats, the Benedictine nuns of San Daniele took possession of the monastery and church, proceeding to carry out several restorations that many critics do not consider entirely respectful of the architectural whole. Finally, Napoleon's edict of 1810 permanently dissolved the monastery, whose cloisters were shortly thereafter demolished to make way for the structure alone, which remained to perform the functions of a parish.

== Exterior ==
=== Parvis ===
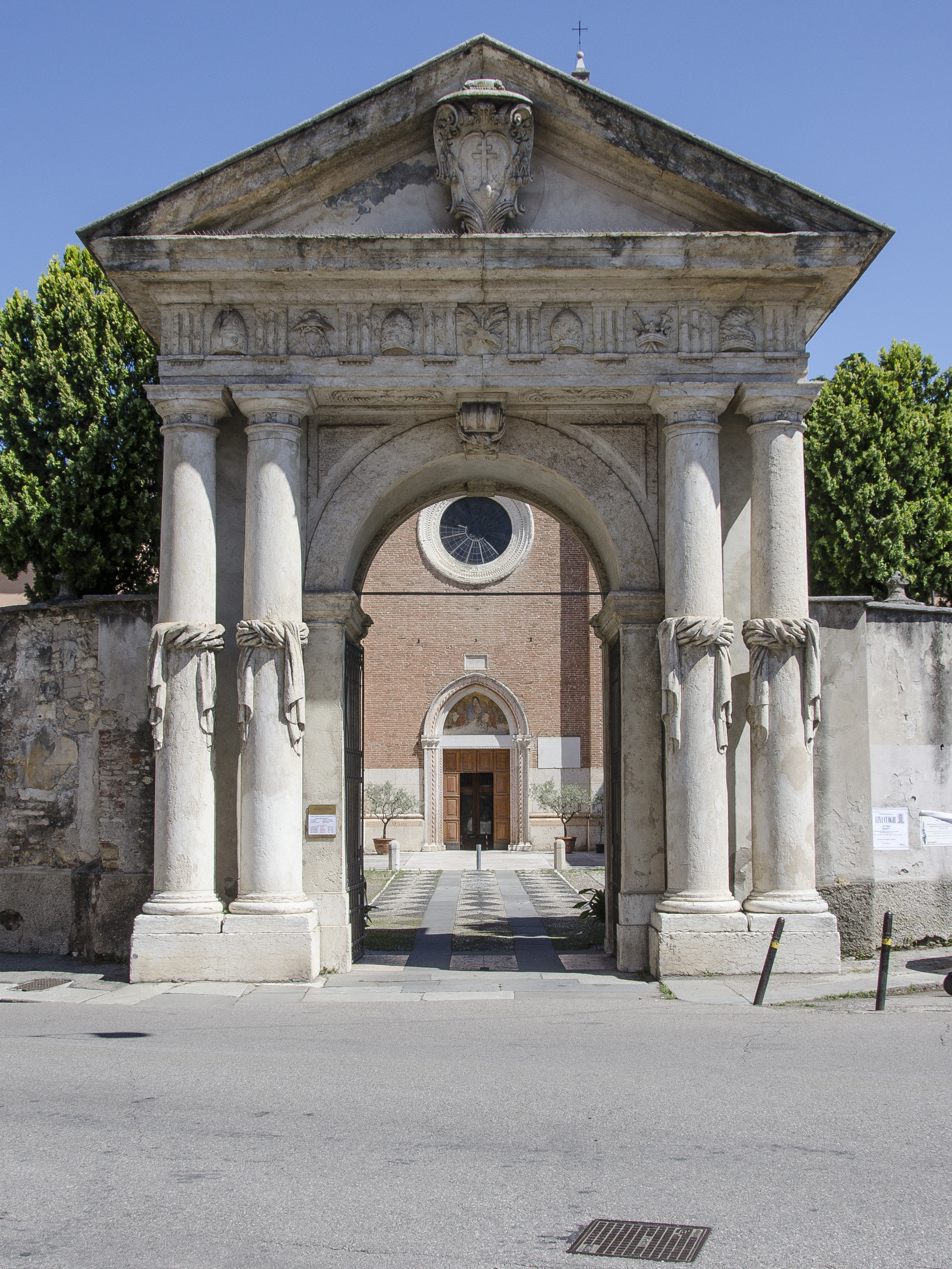
Portal through which the parvis is accessed.

The nobleman Francesco Moscardo financed the large elliptical-shaped parvis in front of the church, designed by architect Antonio Saletti. This is enclosed by a high wall marked by pilasters, which is accessed through a wide and original 1688 Renaissance-style portal, composed of four twin columns resting on square bases. The columns support an entablature of Doric order decorated with ecclesiastical symbols, with a pediment enclosing the tympanum decorated with the cross of Lorraine, a variant of the coat of arms of the Benedictine order, and the motto “PAX.”

The interior elevation of the surrounding wall alternates between pilasters and empty niches in which, according to the designer's intentions, statues were to be placed. The pilasters end with cusps that exceed the wall in height, which in turn are surmounted by a spherical stone. On the internal façade, above the keystone of the arch, there is a plaque that reads, “PROSPECTVM HVVNC SITV SQVALIDVM // AC RUDERIBUS HORRIDUM // IN AMOENIOREM FORTUNAM // ABBAS ET MONACHI RESTITVERVNT // ANNO SALVTIS MDCLXXXVIII // FRANCISCO MOSCARDO CO PROTECTORE.”

=== Façade ===
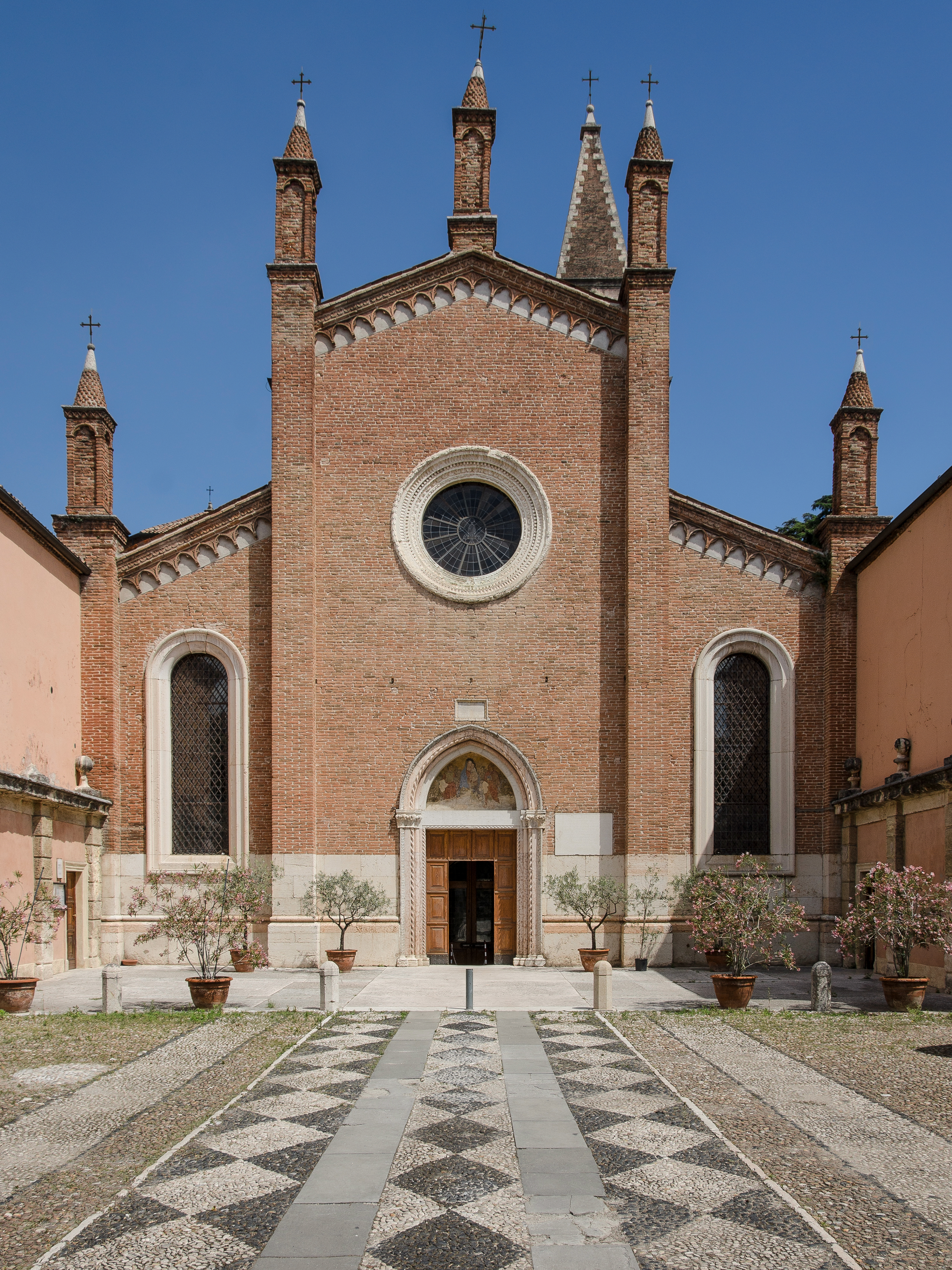
Church façade

The simple terracotta facade is divided by pilasters into three vertical bands corresponding to the interior naves, the central of which is markedly higher than the two side naves. Under the sloping roofs there is a decoration consisting of slightly projecting flying buttresses that are orthogonal to the slope of the roof, while above the eaves five small pillars decorated with a trefoil arch support tall pinnacles ending in a cross. Centrally there is a wide oculus, enclosed in a splayed marble frame with concentric rings, reminiscent of Lombard Gothic architecture.

Below it there is a neo-Gothic style portal enclosed in a slightly splayed pointed arch and supported by imposts consisting of twisted columns juxtaposed with smooth pillars, ending in capitals on which floral motifs are carved. Between the portal and the apex of the arch is a frescoed lunette, now a damaged work by Paolo Ligozzi, in which he depicted the Blessed Virgin and Child and on either side Saints Nazarius and Celsus. Above the portal, a plaque was placed in 1466 to commemorate the completion of the wall structure of the church, while on the right side is a eulogy of the poet Girolamo Pompei. To the side are two large round windows with marble frames that illuminate the interior naves.

=== Bell tower ===
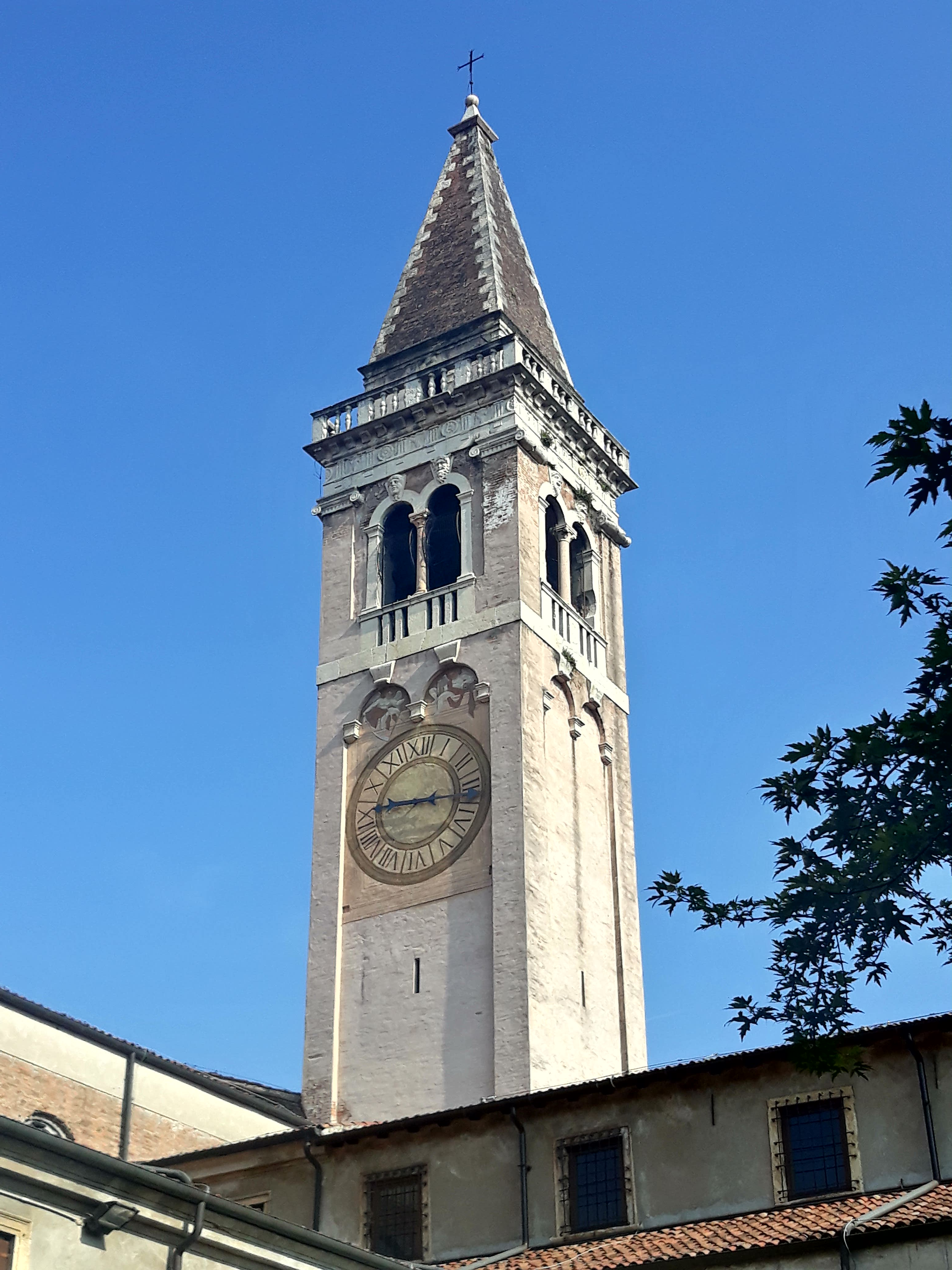
The bell tower of the church

The distinctive and original Renaissance bell tower was commissioned in November 1550 by the abbot Father Mauro Vercelli to the architect Francesco da Castello, a descendant of a family of stone masons originally from Lombardy, while the supply and workmanship of the white stones were entrusted to the Gadin brothers of Sant'Ambrogio di Valpolicella. The tower is characterized by a tall shaft made of brick, in which each elevation is enclosed between two pilasters and ending at the top with two arches, where the corbels supporting them and the keystone ashlars are made of stone material. The belfry, on the other hand, is characterized by a mullioned opening on each side, which have mascarons placed on the keystones. Above the belfry runs a frieze composed of metopes and triglyphs over which rises a loggia with a slightly projecting parapet. Finally, the belfry ends with a square-based pyramidal cone made of terracotta with white stone ribs connecting the four sides. A unique feature among the bell towers in the city of Verona is the presence of the clock on the shaft.

The belfry, in typical fifteenth-century style, houses a set of six bells tuned according to the scale of D3. Cast in 1849 by the Cavadini firm, (Note: The following inscription is stamped on the edge of the bells: "PIETRO – PADRE – FRANCESCO E LUIGI – FIGLI – CAVADINI – FONDITORI – VERONA." In Dal Forno (1982, p. 40).) they are still rung manually according to the technique of Veronese bell ringing.

== Interior ==
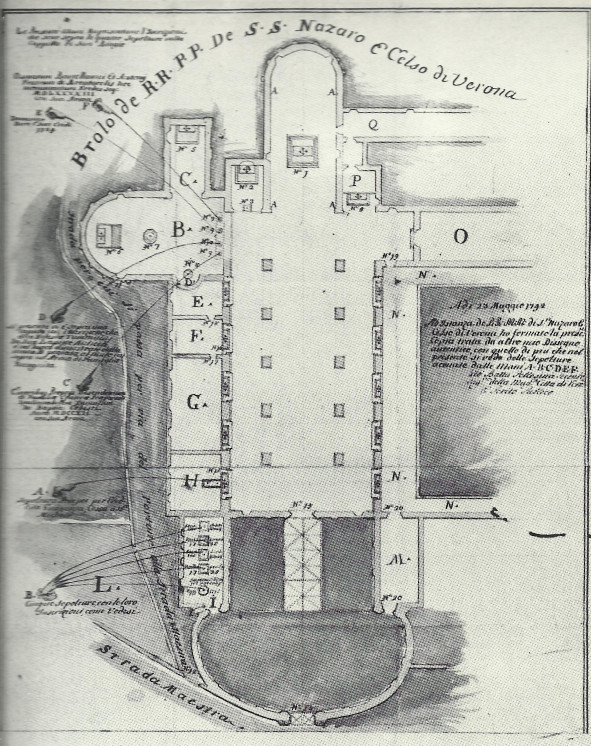
Floor plan of the church. At letter B the chapel of St. Blaise, at letter O the sacristy.

The fifteenth-century church building has three naves ending in three apses, all covered by vaults. The naves have six bays each and are marked by pilasters with lesenes of Doric order. These in turn support lesenes of Ionic order, on which the arches of the vaults of the nave are set. The transverse arches of the aisles, on the other hand, are pointed.

The nave, in addition to the open oculus on the façade, is illuminated by the small round windows placed at each bay in the intrados of the vault. Along the walls of the aisles are placed, slightly recessed, five altars all framed by mirrored pilasters decorated in the shaft and supporting a capital. The two smaller naves receive light exclusively from two large round-arched windows inserted in the facade. The nave ends in a transept whose left arm ends in a balustrade separating it from the chapel of St. Blaise, while the right arm leads to the sacristy.

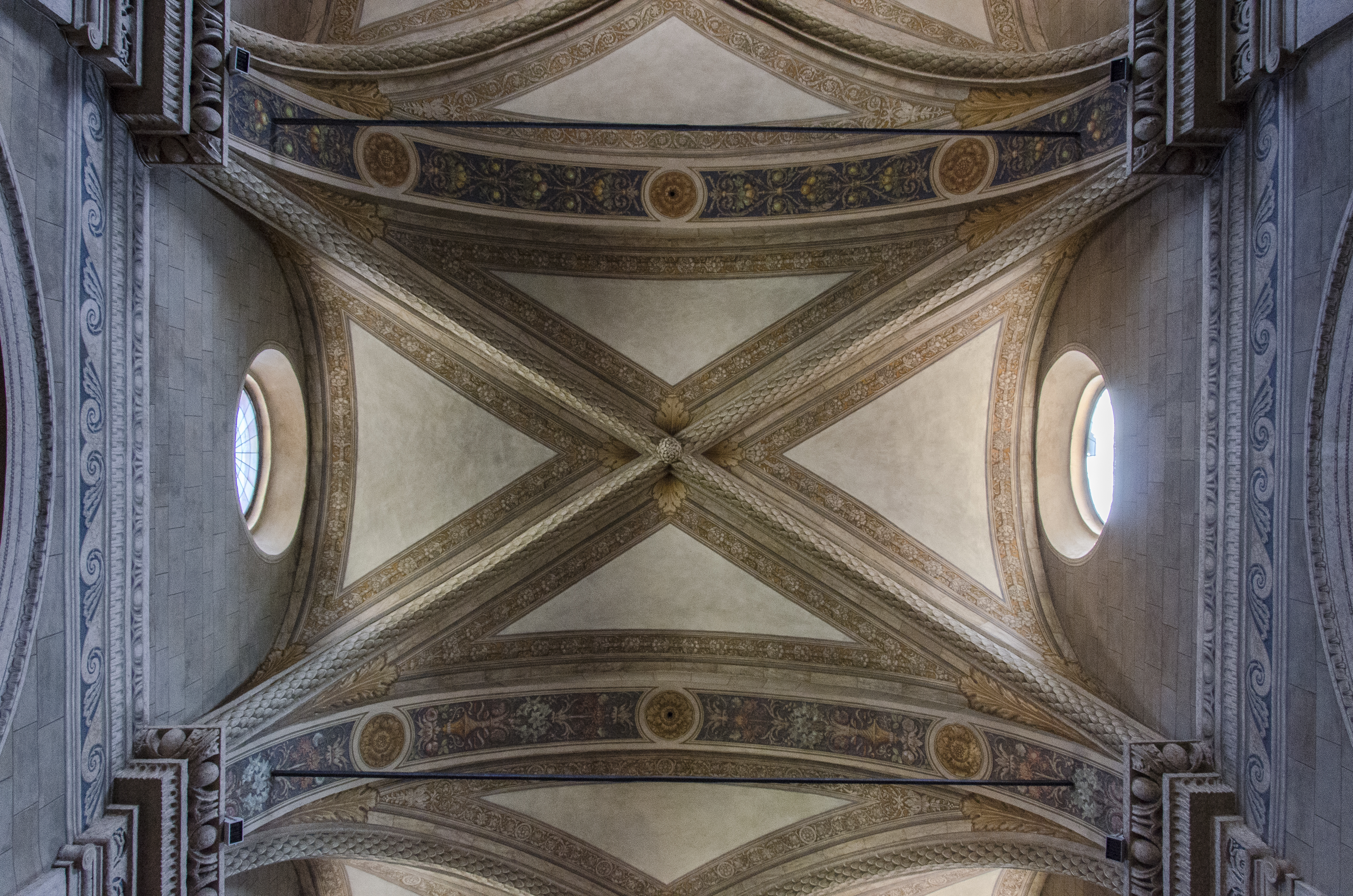
The vaulted ceiling of the nave

The chancel is rectangular in shape as is the choir. On either side of the chancel are small chapels that continue the two aisles. The church ends with a semicircular apse with a basin. The current floor was laid in 1843.

The church organ, placed in the choir loft above the entrance door, is an 1852 creation by Gian Battista De Lorenzi of Vicenza and features two doors painted by Battista Brusasorzi depicting musician angels placed behind a balcony of a loggia. There are also three confessionals made of walnut and dating back to the 16th century. Finally, as soon as one enters, one encounters two stoups made of red Verona marble, also from the 16th century. The panels of the Stations of the Cross were painted in 1820.

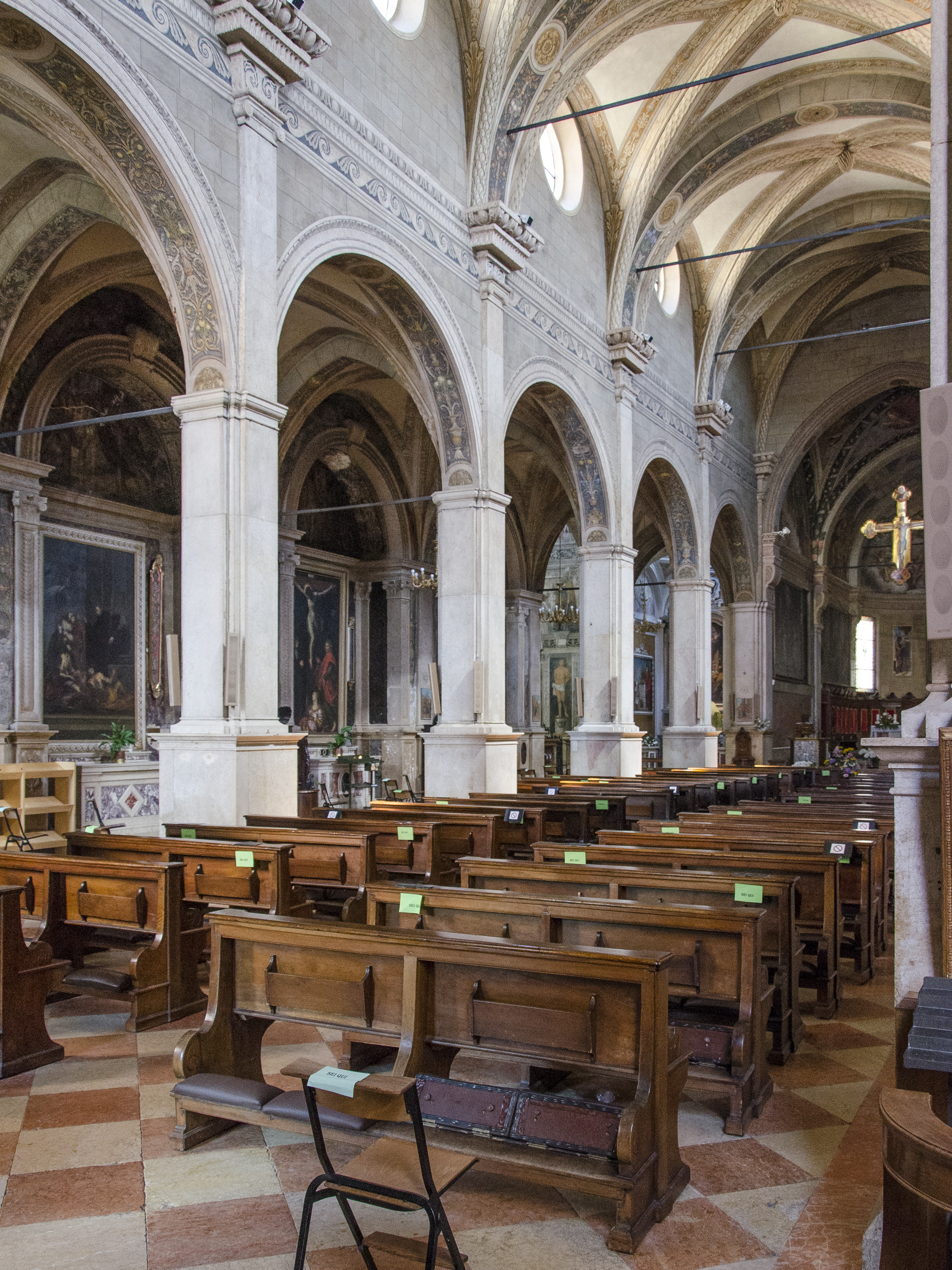
Left aisle

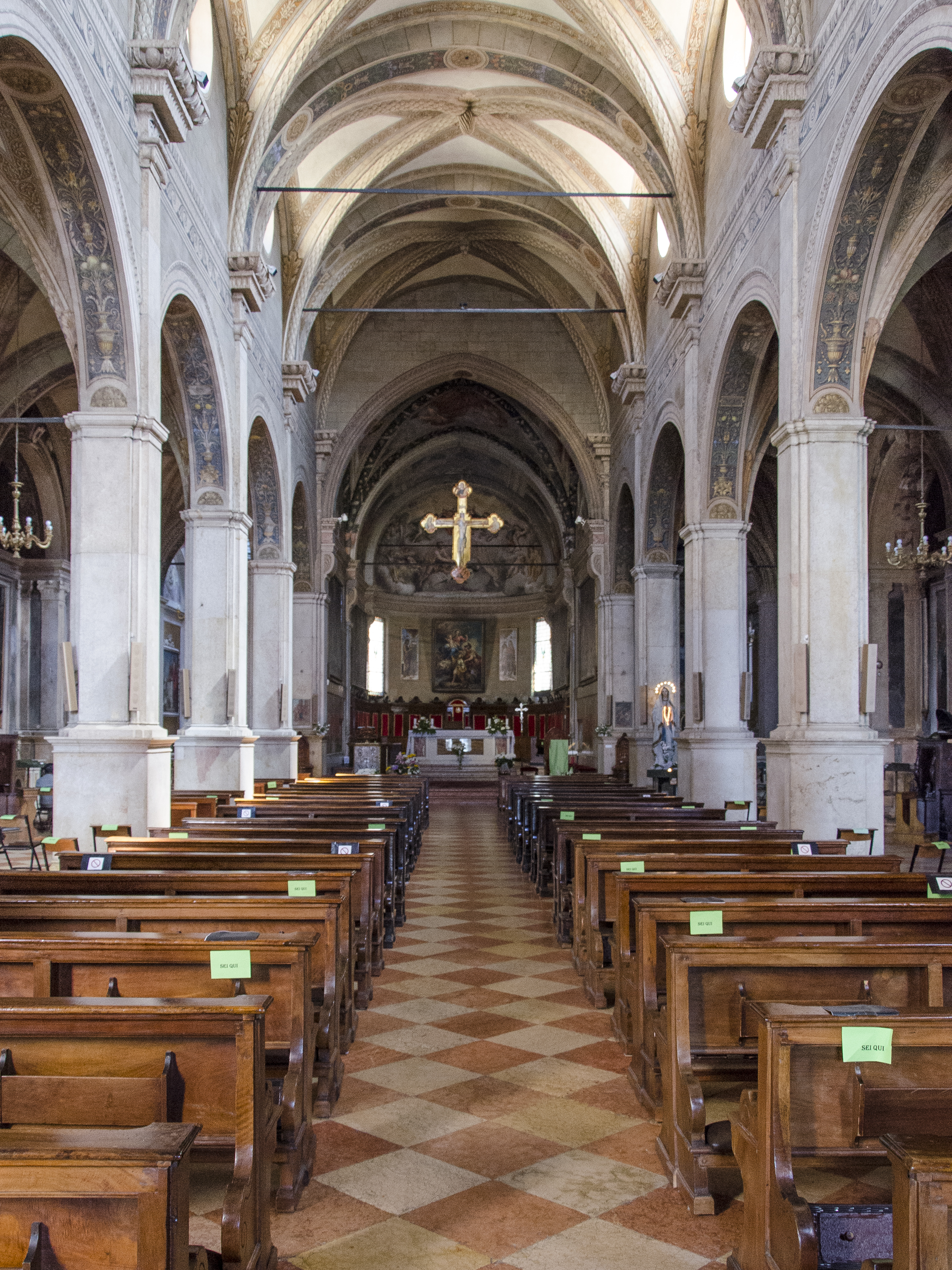
Central aisle

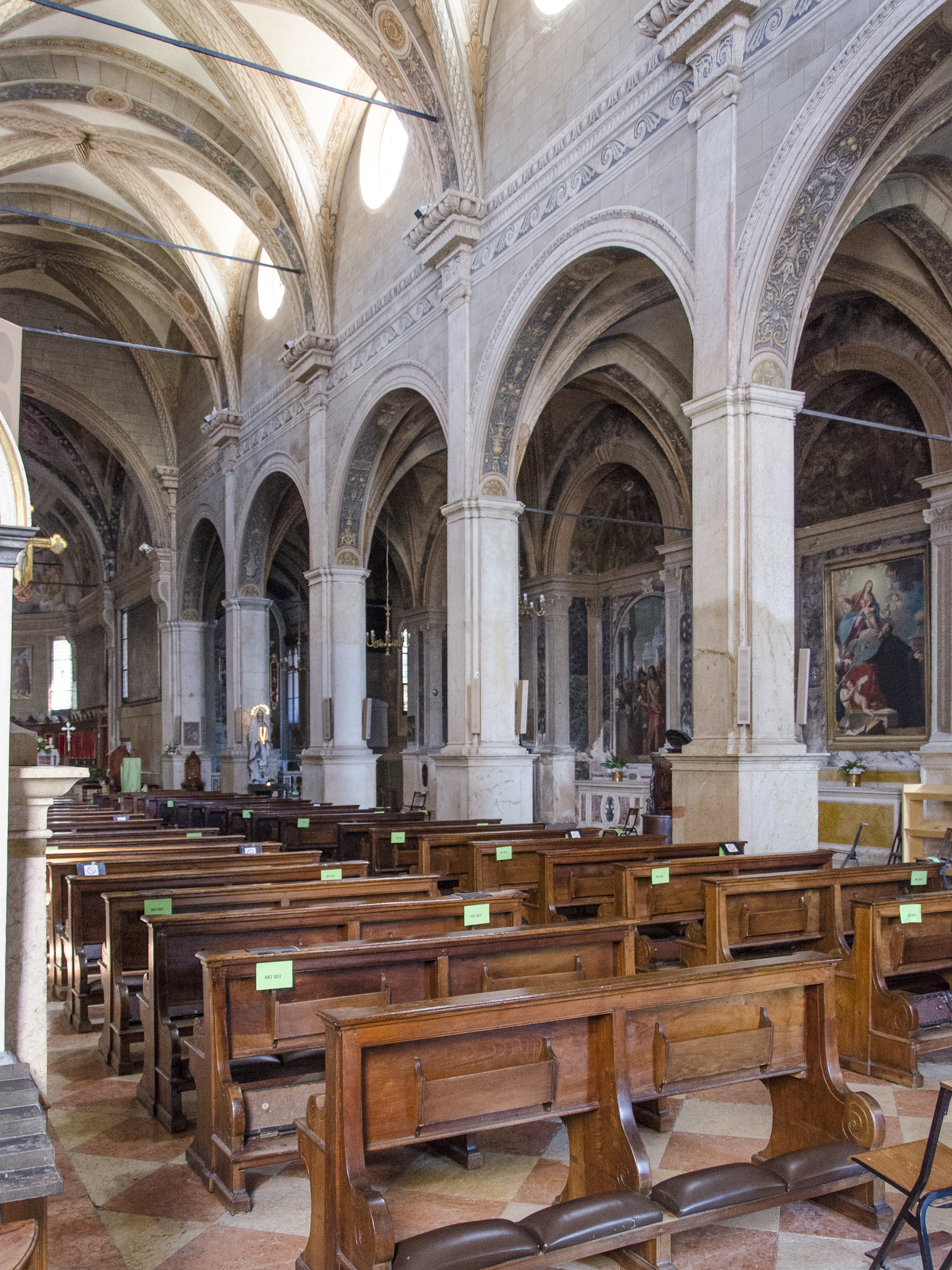
Right aisle

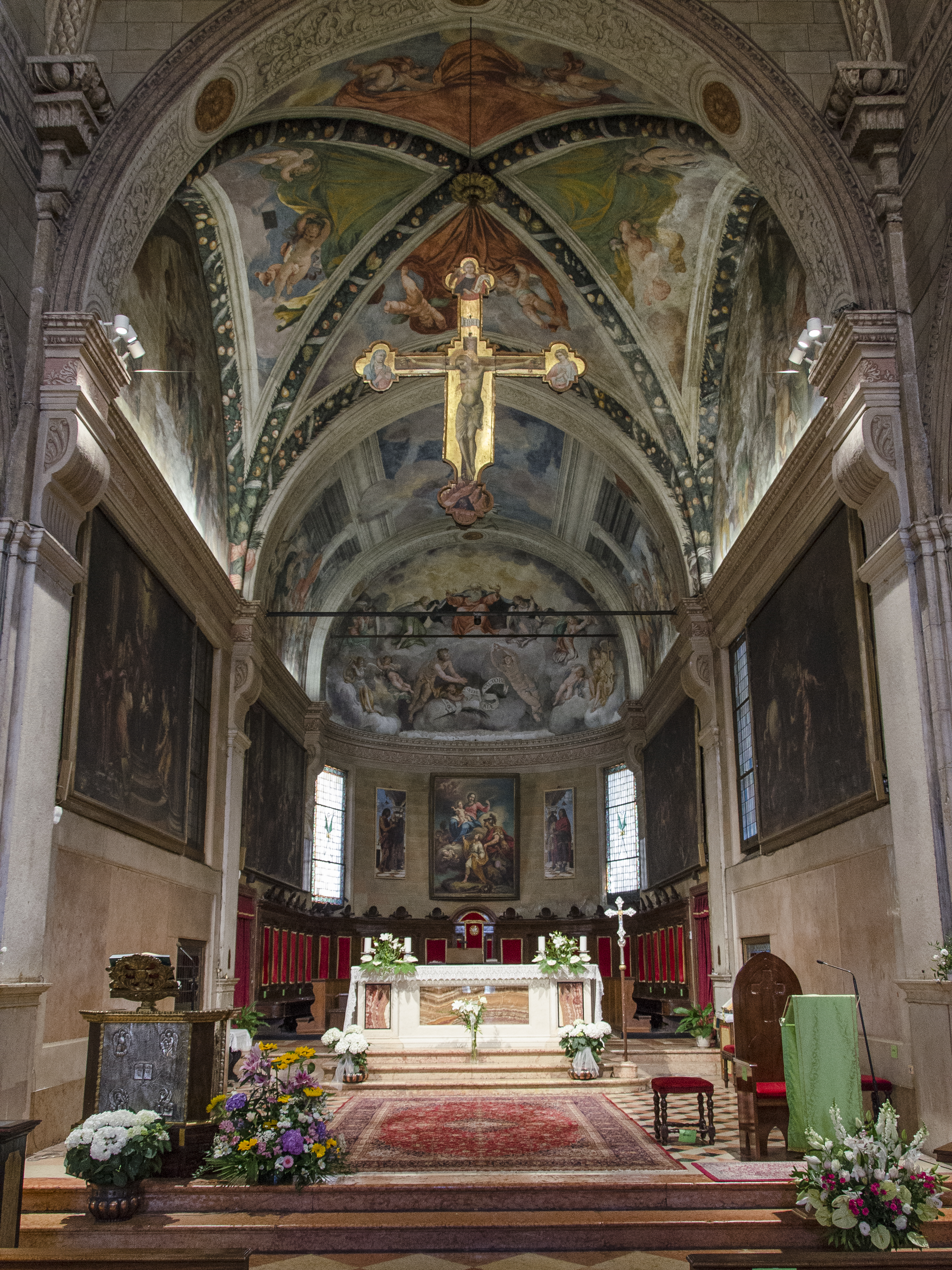
Presbytery

=== Altars in the left aisle ===
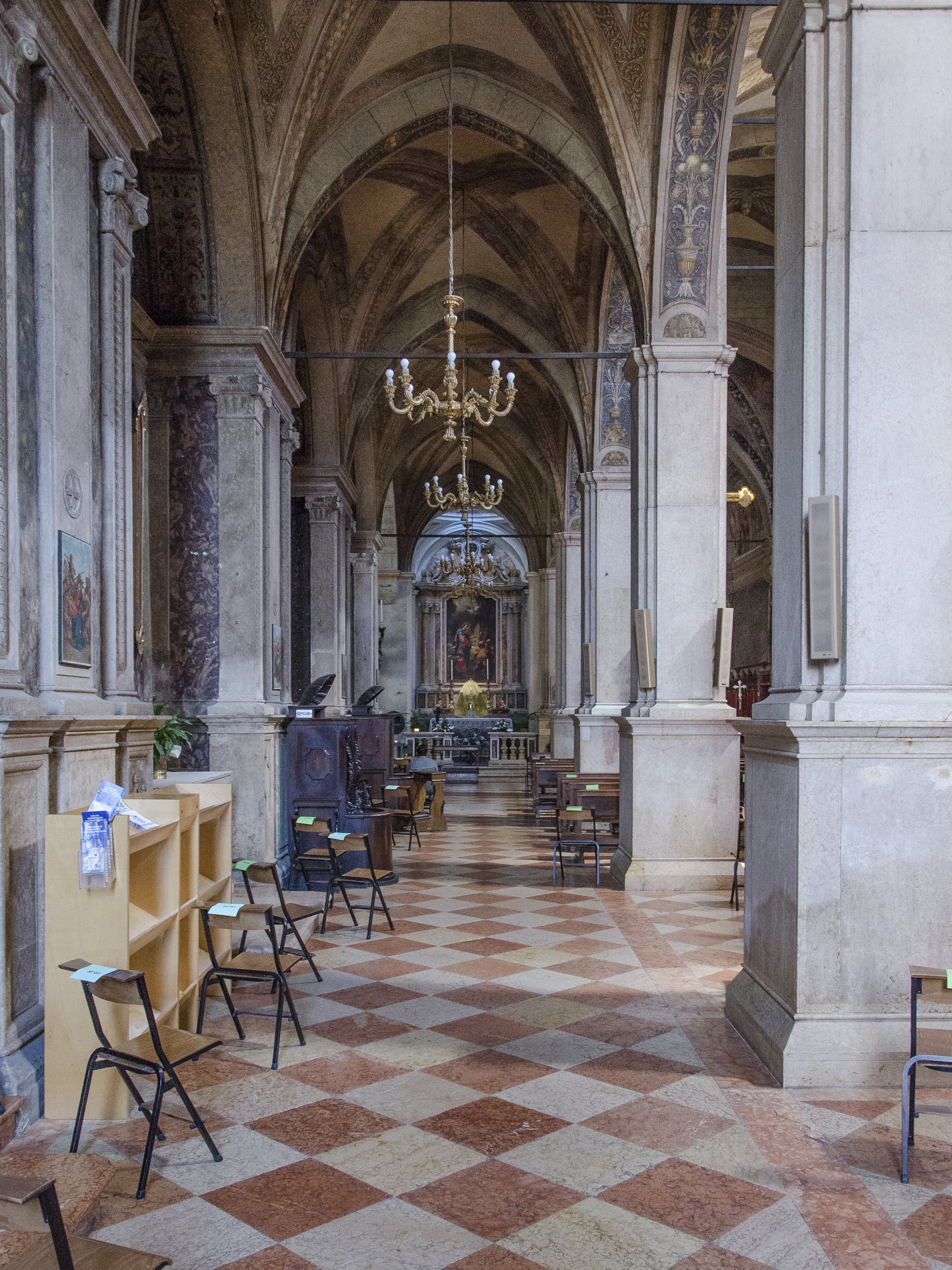
Left aisle

The first altar one encounters in the left aisle contains an altarpiece, datable to around 1580, by Michelangelo Aliprandi depicting a Blessed Virgin suckling on a throne with Saints Roch and Sebastian on either side, surmounted by a lunette, also by Aliprandi, with the baptism of Christ. In both works it is noticeable how the author drew inspiration from exponents of the Veronese school such as Caroto, dai Libri and his master, the painter Paolo Veronese, while attesting to a more modest qualitative achievement. On the first pillar of the nave hangs an oil-on-canvas painting by an anonymous 15th-century painter, probably an imitator of Stefano da Verona, depicting a Madonna and Child in her arms.

The altarpiece of the second altar, on the other hand, is a valuable work signed and dated 1545 by the painter Antonio Badile in which is depicted The Blessed Virgin with Child in Glory and Saints Baptist, Anthony Abbot, Benedict, and Blaise and traditionally known as the St. Blaise altarpiece. On the back is information about the date of its completion and placement. (Note: On the back is written: "Ab. Ant. Bajlo Veron. hoc opus factum est die jovis penultimo octobris MDXLIII." In Dal Forno (1982, p. 57).) The canvas, distinctly Mannerist, recalls Lombard art and in particular the style of Moretto da Brescia. The lunette painting, The Temptations of St. Anthony Abbot, on the other hand, is by Michelangelo Aliprandi.

The painter Giulio Carpioni, on the other hand, is the artist of the altarpiece of the third altar, in which St. Maurus healing the sick is depicted, while the execution of the lunette was entrusted to Battista del Moro, who frescoed a St. Francis receiving the stigmata.

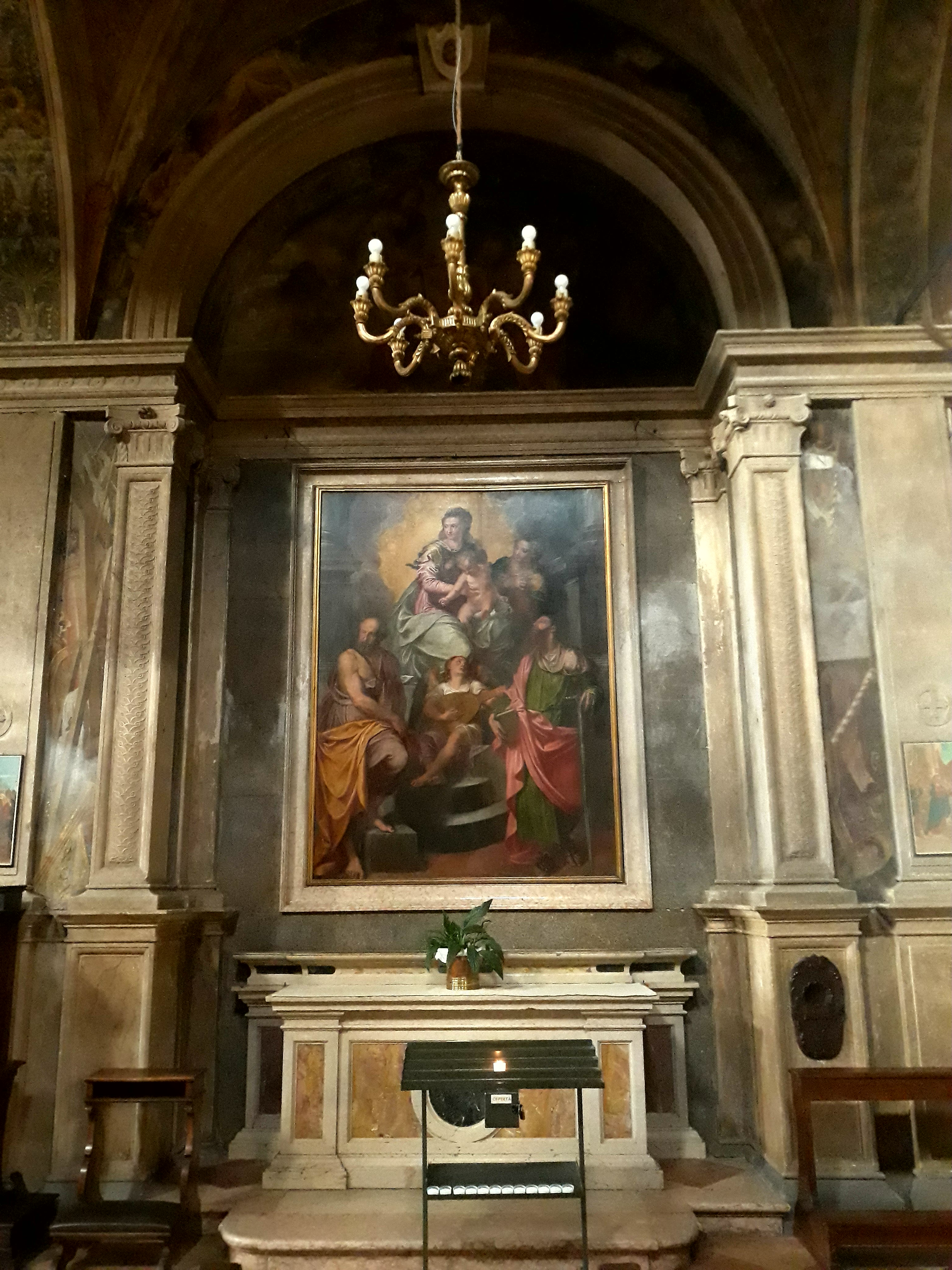
Fifth altar, altarpiece by Domenico Brusasorzi, Blessed Virgin and Child

The fourth altar is adorned with an altarpiece, Christ Crucified, painted in 1560 by Orlando Flacco, in which the skillful use of chiaroscuro to emphasize the dramatic aspect of the scene stands out. The Risen Christ in the lunette, traditionally attributed to the hand of Francesco Torbido but more recently speculated to be Flacco's, is of doubtful attribution.

Finally, the altarpiece that adorns the fifth altar, depicting Blessed Virgin and Child with Saints Peter, Paul and Margaret, is a fine work by the Veronese painter Domenico Brusasorzi, which can be dated between 1547 and 1548. The color composition is of particular interest, especially the iridescent pink used for the Madonna's robe and the sand color for St. Peter's tunic. Initially the painting was placed in the church of Santa Maria del Paradiso and then moved here in 1810. Also by Brusasorzi is the lunette painting in which he depicts Christ handing the keys to St. Peter, a fresco work deeply influenced by the Venetian school.

=== Altars of the right aisle ===
The first altar of the right aisle belonged, as can be seen from the noble coat of arms represented in the plinth of the side pillars, to the noble Orci family. The author of the altarpiece The Conversion of St. Paul, dated 1584, is the painter Bernardino India, who drew inspiration from the Mantuan Giulio Romano to create it. India also made the oil painting and almost monochrome (with whitish and light yellow tones), Transfiguration of Christ, for the lunette, while the decorations of the sub-arches may be attributable to the workshop of Paolo Farinati.

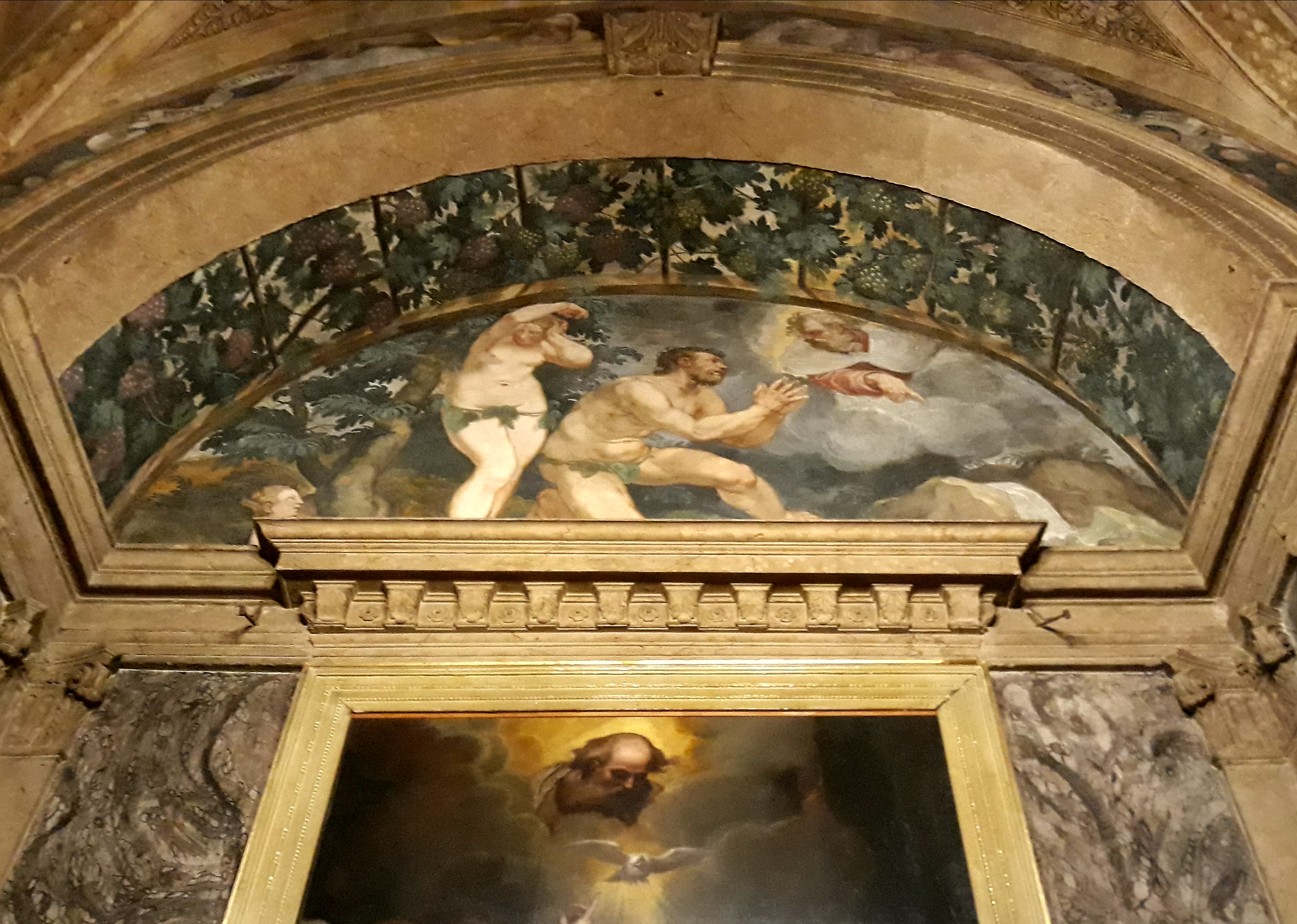
Lunette with Adam and Eve banished from the Earthly Paradise by Paolo Farinati, second altar on the right

By Farinati is the canvas depicting an Annunciation placed on the second altar, which, in addition to signing it, Paolo also dated MDLVII. The same artist also chose to depict Adam and Eve banished from the Earthly Paradise in the lunette, which is considered one of Farinati's best works and whose preparatory drawing is now preserved in the royal collections of Windsor Castle.

Giovanni and Paolino Caliari, on the other hand, are the authors of the altarpiece Sacred Heart of Jesus in Glory and on the sides St. Benedict of Nursia and Blessed Catherine of Racconigi for the third altar on the right, which they signed “PAOLO ET JOVANES CALIARI - V. PIN - MDCCCXXVI.” The lunette, on the other hand, is the work of Battista del Moro, in which he depicts The Meeting of Christ with Pious Women.

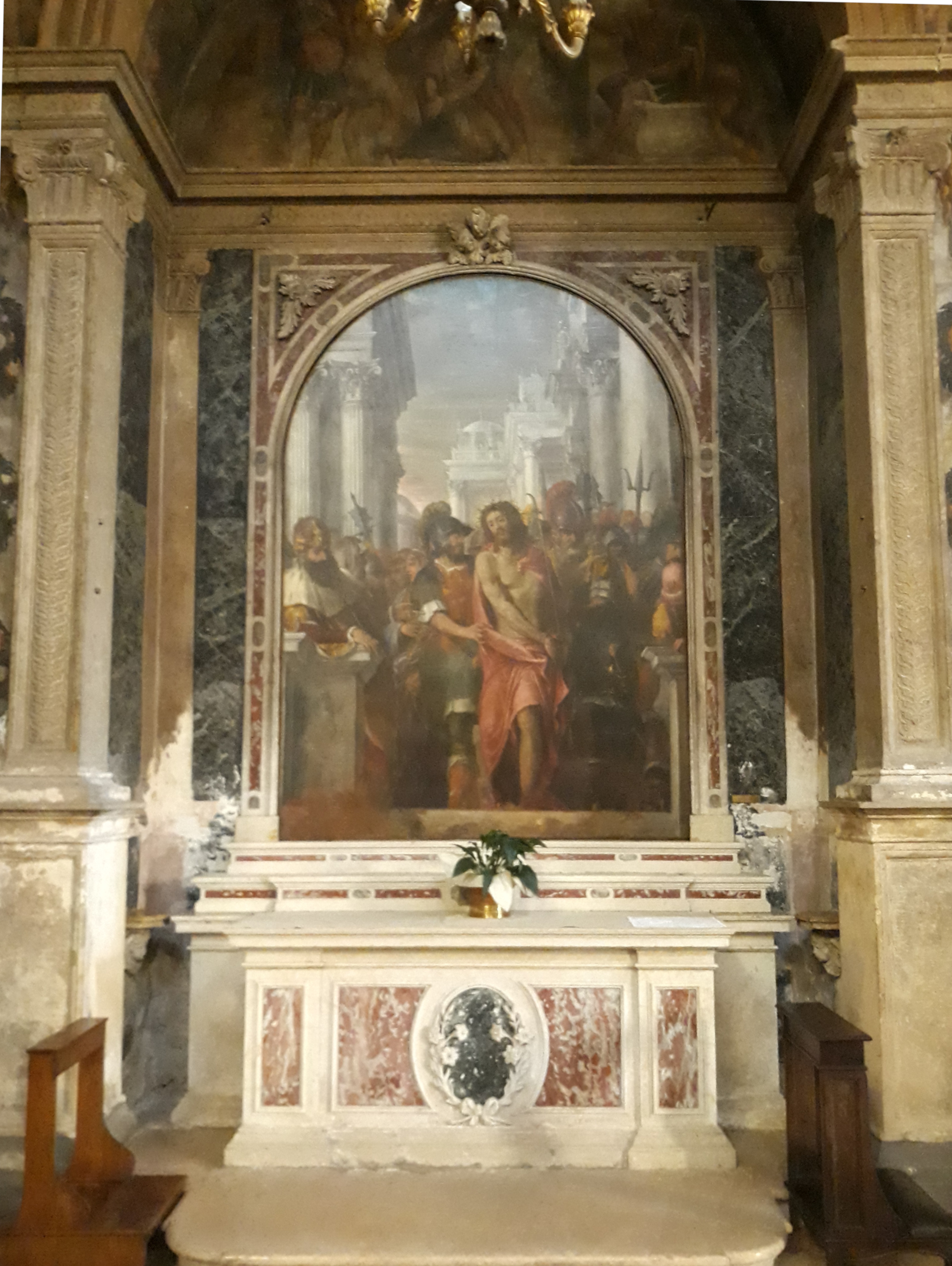
Fourth altar of the right aisle with the Ecce Homo altarpiece by painter Orlando Flacco

The Mannerist altarpiece of the fourth altar is a Christ Presented to the People (or Ecce Homo), a work by painter Orlando Flacco dating from 1560, in which compositional elements, such as the architectural setting of the background and the two figures of soldiers, denote a clear inspiration from the style of Paolo Veronese. A young Battista del Moro is the author of the lunette Saint before a judge made in 1632.

On the fifth and last altar is the altarpiece Holy Family in Glory, on the lower sides Saints Anthony of Padua and Francis made by Giovanni Caliari around the first half of the 19th century. Giovanni's father Paolino Caliari, on the other hand, is the author of the lunette depicting The Descent of the Holy Spirit.

=== Transept ===
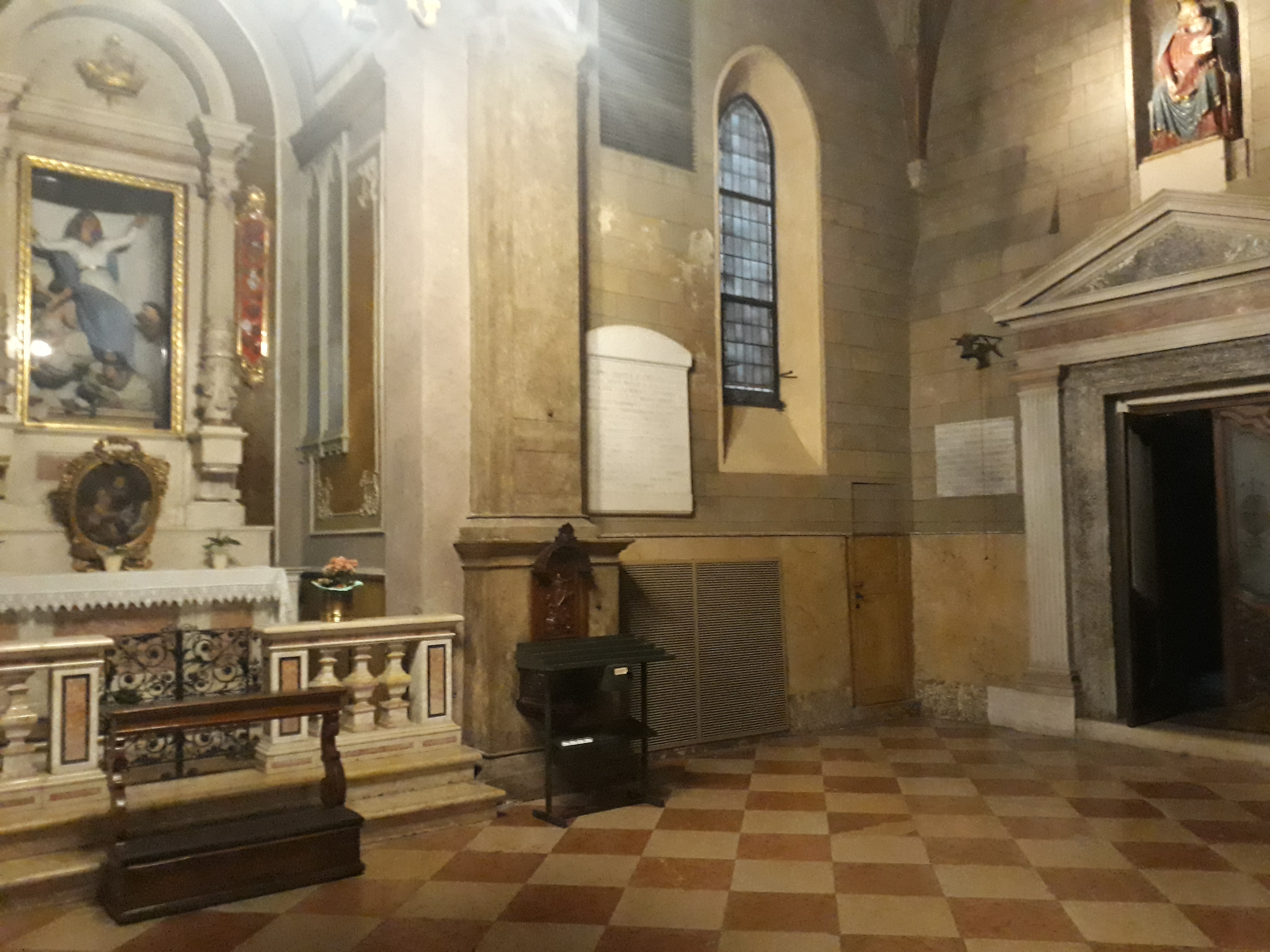
Right transept with the small chapel dedicated to the Virgin of the Assumption

On the right transept, located in front of the aisle, there is a chapel built by Ottavio Zanella in 1805 to a design by Leonardo Manzati and dedicated to the Virgin of the Assumption. The barrel-vaulted ceiling is decorated with a fresco by an unknown author. At the end of the right arm of the transept there is a sacristy; on the same wall there are some remarkable plaques. One of them, placed to the left of the door leading to the sacristy, commemorates the consecration of the church in 1484, while the one on the right attests to the translation of the relics of Saints Blaise and Juliana to the new chapel in 1466. Above the door is a polychrome terracotta statue placed in a niche. On the right wall is the door leading to the cloister and above it is placed, in a niche, the bust of the poet Girolamo Pompei. (Note: At the base is the inscription: "HIERONYMO FANCISCI .F. // POMPEJO // ORATORI . PHILOLOGO . POETAE . // HOMINI . OPTIMO. // PUBLICE. // AN. MDCCLXXXXI." In Dal Forno (1982, p. 68).) On the right side there is also a small room that houses the tomb of the Priests; on the floor is a plaque with the inscription, “SACERDOTUM SODALITATI MDCCLXXIX.”

On the left arm of the transept, at the side aisle, is the Chapel of the Sacred Body of Christ (or Chapel of the Most Holy). Built in 1722, it features a dome with coffered decoration. Originally above the Baroque altar there was an altarpiece depicting Christ with the apostles by Antonio Balestra, now moved to the nearby chapel of the Gaio family; a statue of the Blessed Virgin of Lourdes now stands in its place. On the walls are two canvases by 18th-century painter Felice Boscaratti: on the right The Dream of Elijah, on the left The Sacrifice of Melchizedek. Finally, the transept arm ends with the Chapel of St. Blaise.

=== Presbytery, chancel and apse ===
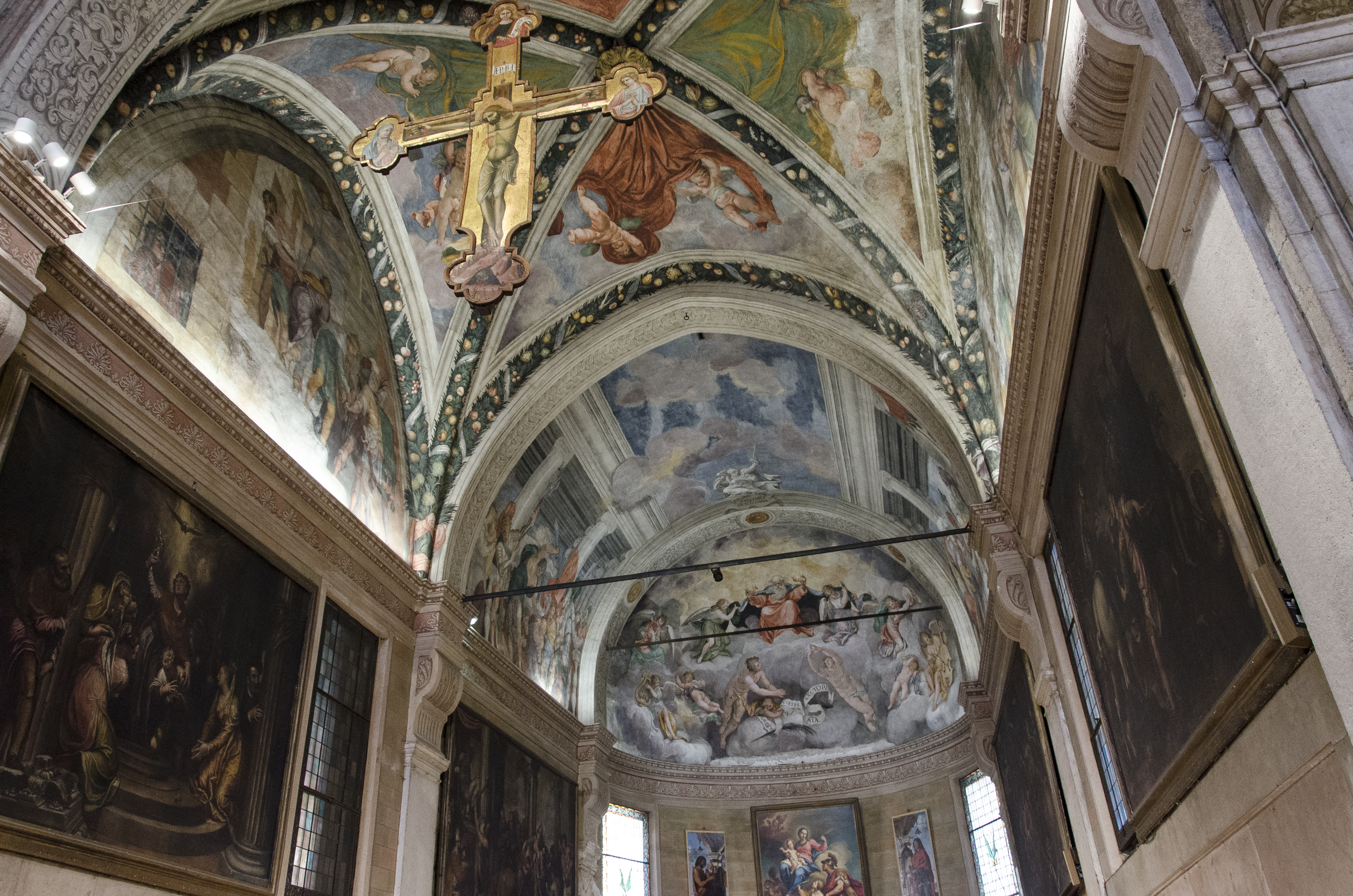
Presbytery of the church. The vault and the apse basin were frescoed by Paolo Farinati and he also painted the canvases on the sides of the chancel

In Renaissance style, the chancel of the church of Saints Nazarius and Celsus is surmounted by a vaulted ceiling and decorated with frescoes by Paolo Farinati, who also painted the paintings placed there. On the left is The Baptism of Saint Nazarius by Saint Linus in which Farinati made his self-portrait and that of Paolo Veronese in the faces of the two men leaning against the columns. Above it the lunette represents Saints Nazarius and Celsus being led to prison. Also Paolo is the author of the canvas hanging on the right wall, Journey of Saint Nazarius from Rome to Milan, surmounted by the lunette Saints Nazarius and Celsus illuminated by the Holy Spirit shatter idols. Both show a distinctly Mannerist style, with the characters' postures somewhat strained. In the center of the chancel hangs a large Crucifix painted in tempera on panel with a gold background.

The chancel has a ceiling that in the first part is barrel-vaulted, while in the apse it is conch-vaulted. The latter was frescoed by Farinati, as were the canvases placed to the left and right of the choir, the former depicting Saints Nazarius and Celsus being led before the emperor to sacrifice to the Roman gods (signed and dated “PAVLVS - FARINATI - F - MDLXXI”), the latter The miraculous rescue of Saints Nazarius and Celsus thrown into the sea. Paolo Farinati is also the author of the Coronation of the Martyred Saints Nazarius and Celsus that decorates the apse basin. Also on the apse, in the center is the canvas The Virgin with the Son in Glory and at the feet Saints Nazarius and Celsus of uncertain attribution, although several names have been proposed. (Note: Among several possible proposed authors: Gian Battista Burato (1731-1787) and Michelangelo Prunati (1690-1756, son of Sante Prunati). In Dal Forno (1982, p. 67).) On the left panel are depicted Saints John the Baptist and Benedict while on the right panel are Saints Nazarius and Celsus.

=== Chapel of Saint Blaise ===
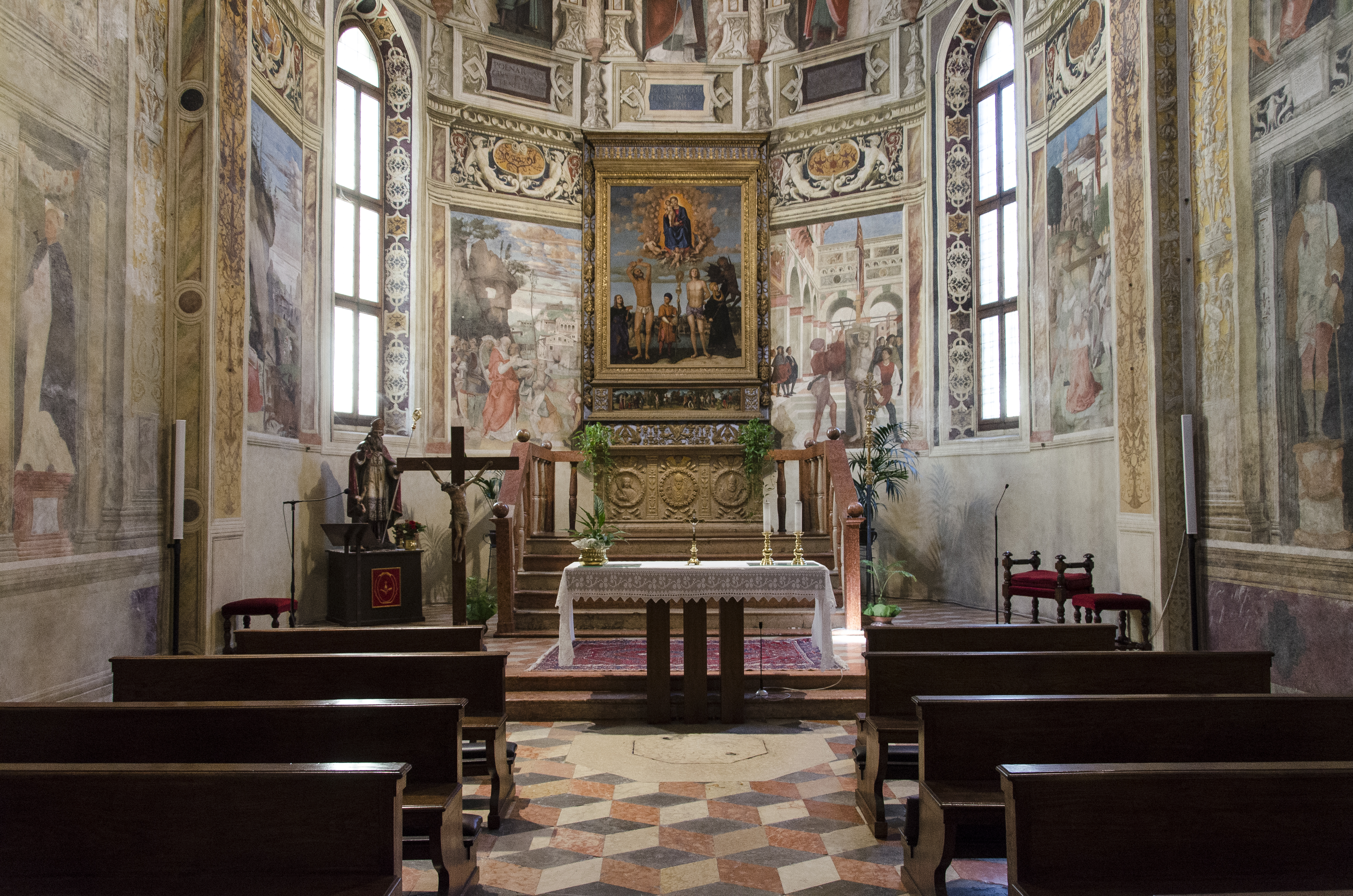
Chapel of St. Blaise, at the back in the apse can be seen the triptych by Francesco Bonsignori

At the end of the left arm of the transept is the Chapel of St. Blaise, considered the most valuable work in the church. Work on its construction, intended to house the relics of St. Blaise and St. Juliana, began in 1488 on a project by Beltrame di Valsolda, who was also commissioned to direct the building site. However, Beltrame was joined by the young painter Giovanni Maria Falconetto, to whom most attribute the true authorship of the work, relegating the former to the role of executor. Work on the chapel was made possible thanks to the financial commitment of the Compagnia di san Biagio, a congregation that had been founded precisely to support the construction site, which had four burials made in the floor for its members. Other funding came from the patrons of the two sepulchral shrines placed on the right and left. The first religious service in the new chapel was held on July 30, 1491, while the solemn translation of the saint's relic took place at the Easter of 1508. However, the work was not yet finished but went on for another 20 years, reaching completion only in 1528. Finally, on January 31, 1529, Gian Pietro Carafa, the future Pope Paul IV, was able to consecrate the chapel. Flooring work was completed in the following years, carried out by workers employed by Pietro and Gabriele Caliari, respectively grandfather and father of the painter Paolo Veronese.

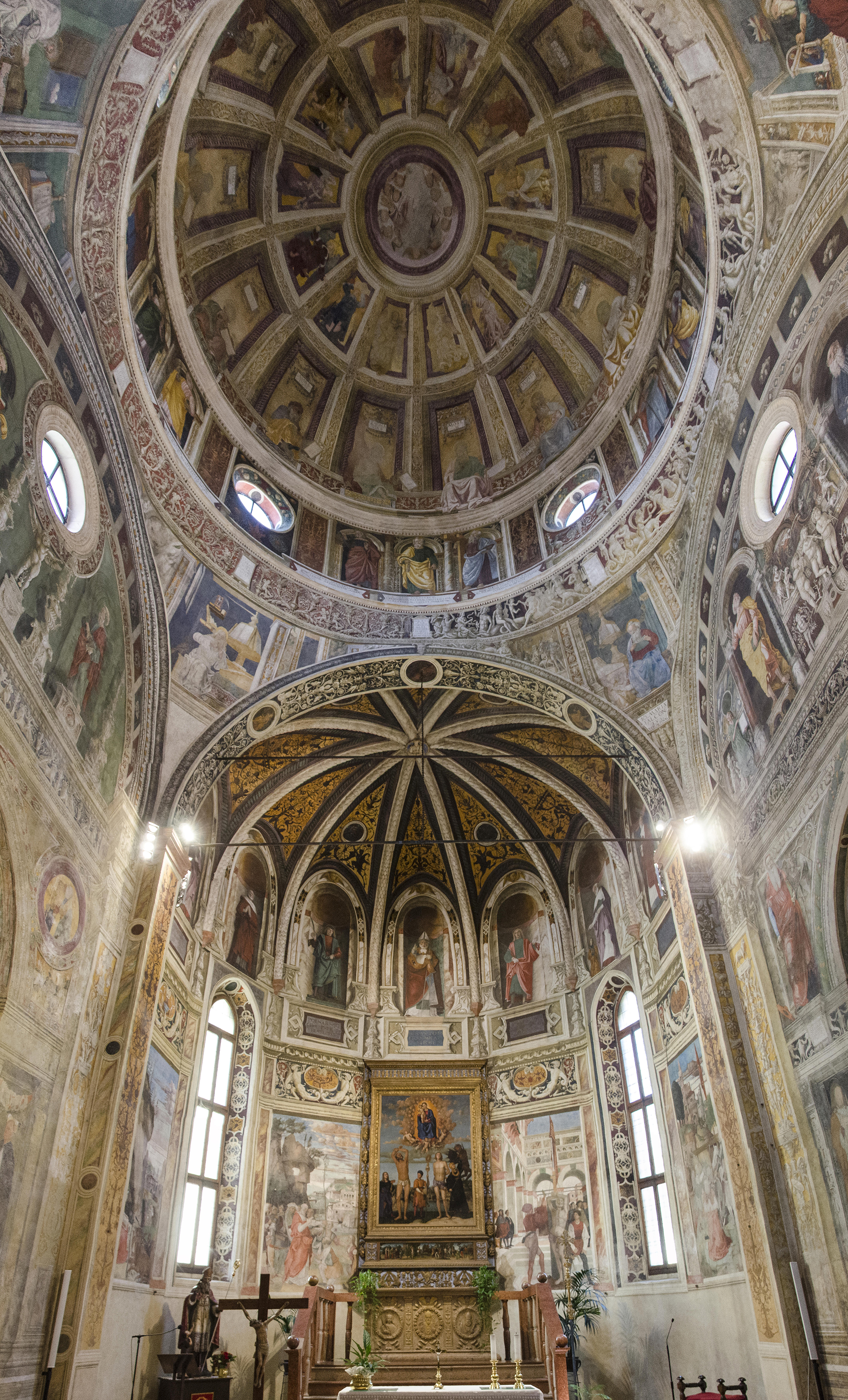
The semi-dome of the chapel's apse and the dome surmounting the drum

The architecture of the chapel consists, essentially, of three overlapping structures: a cube with 8.2-meter sides at the base, an octagonal drum, and a dome. In the side walls, two niches are open in which small chapels have been carved out; the polygonal apse has a ribbed vault in the Gothic style.

All the interior surfaces of the chapel are decorated with frescoes by Falconetto, who worked there between 1497 and 1499. The artist painted multiple figures of saints, prophets and angels, not failing to insert them into precise and detailed architectural elements. In the undertaking he was aided by some of his workshop pupils, such as a certain Zuan Giacomo, who produced an Adoration of the Magi for the semi-dome of the apse of the left chapel. Of fine workmanship are the St. Roch and St. Sebastian on the lower right wall. The interior façade of the entrance arch into the chapel, on the other hand, was painted by Cavazzola in 1514 with an Annunciation and on the sides St. Blaise and St. Zeno. The right chapel also contains canvases by Palma il Giovane, while the left chapel contains a triptych by Girolamo Mocetto.

The apse of the chapel is polygonal in shape and is raised by two steps. The frescoes in the apsidal basin are the work of Domenico Morone, who divides the space into seven segments within which he depicts as many figures of saints and martyrs. In the center is the altarpiece Our Lady in Glory and Saints Juliana and Blaise, commissioned on July 20, 1514 from the painter Francesco Bonsignori. This is set in a fine frame made by a certain Piero in 1526 (Note: "Piero, engraver who lives in Via Corso". In Dal Forno (1982, p. 92).) and later decorated by Callisto and Girolamo dai Libri, with the latter also making the predella, depicting A Miracle of Saint Blaise, The Martyrdom of Saint Sebastian and The Beheading of Saint Juliana.

=== Sacristy ===
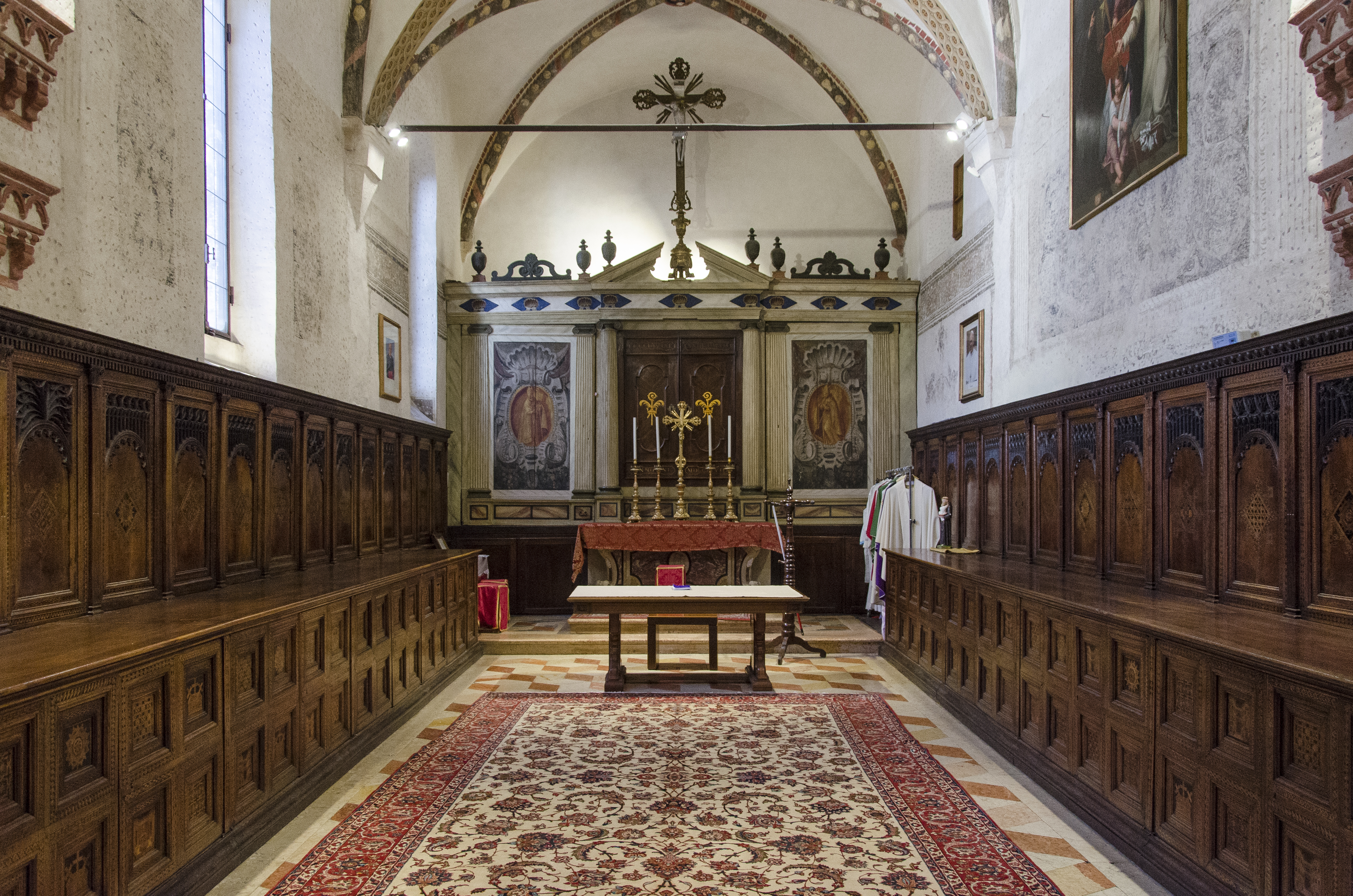
The church sacristy

At the end of the right arm of the transept is the door through which one enters the sacristy. Its space is divided into three bays with ribbed vaulting with multiple decorated imposts and wall units. The room is adorned with a complex of wooden elements consisting of pews and coffers made around the end of the 15th century by an unknown artist. The most interesting piece of furniture is the large cabinet located at the back of the sacristy, which adorns the altar and in which two inscriptions are engraved: “RELIQVIAE SANCTORVM and ANNO DNI . MDCCLXVIII."

The sacristy also contains a number of canvases: Bartolomeo Montagna painted the polyptych with Saints Julian and Blaise and Christ in the Sepulcher; Felice Brusasorzi is the author of The Blessed Virgin with the Son in Glory, on the lower sides Saints Peter, Paul, Augustine and Benedict hanging above the entrance door; on the right wall hangs a kneeling St. Benedict in adoration of the Virgin signed by Simone Brentana and dated 1723; by an anonymous artist, although a possible attribution to Francesco Benaglio has been proposed, is the oil on panel painting depicting The Pietà with St. Benedict and another saint on either side.

== See also ==
- Monuments of Verona
- Churches of Verona
- Roman Catholic Diocese of Verona
- San Biagio Chapel

== Bibliography ==
- Biancolini, Giovanni Battista (1723). Notizie storiche delle chiese di Verona [Historical news of the churches of Verona] (in Italian). Verona.
- Borelli, Giorgio (1980). Chiese e monasteri di Verona [Churches and monasteries in Verona] (in Italian). Verona: Banca Popolare di Verona.
- Dal Forno, Federico (1982). La Chiesa dei SS. Nazaro e Celso [The Church of Sts. Nazarius and Celsus] (in Italian). Verona: Fiorini.
- Tessari, Umberto Gaetano (1958). La chiesa di San Nazaro [The church of St. Nazarius] (in Italian). Verona: Vita Veronese.
- Varanini, Gian Maria (2004). Il sacello di S. Michele presso la chiesa dei SS. Nazaro e Celso a Verona [The sacellum of St. Michael at the church of Sts. Nazarius and Celsus in Verona] (in Italian). Sommacampagna: Cierre.
- Viviani, Giuseppe Franco (2004). Chiese nel veronese [Churches in the Verona area] (in Italian). Verona: Società cattolica di assicurazione.
