= Michelangelo Aliprandi =

Italian painter

Michelangelo Aliprandi (1527–1595) was an Italian painter from Verona, who also painted a fresco at the Miniscalchi Palace there. He who flourished from about 1560 to 1582.

== Work ==
He was an imitator, if not a pupil, of Paolo Veronese, in whose style he painted an altar-piece — the Madonna and Child between St. Roch and St. Sebastian — in the church of SS. Nazaro e Celso in Verona, where it is still preserved. Many of the works which Aliprandi painted in and around his native city are however lost.

His drawing of Virgin and Child crowned by the angels, with St. Sebastian and St. Rock is in the Louvre.
