= Giovanni Badile =

Italian painter

Giovanni Badile (1379 - 1448/1451) was an Italian painter active in Verona.

He was born in Verona. He painted a signed altarpiece of the Madonna and Saints in a Verona Gallery. Records of him exist from 1418 to 1433. His great-grandson Giovanni Antonio Badile was also a painter.

== Literature ==
- Bryan, Michael (1886). Robert Edmund Graves (ed.). Dictionary of Painters and Engravers, Biographical and Critical. Vol. I: A-K. London: George Bell and Sons. p. 67.
