= The Feast in the House of Simon the Pharisee (Veronese, Milan) =

Painting by Paolo Veronese

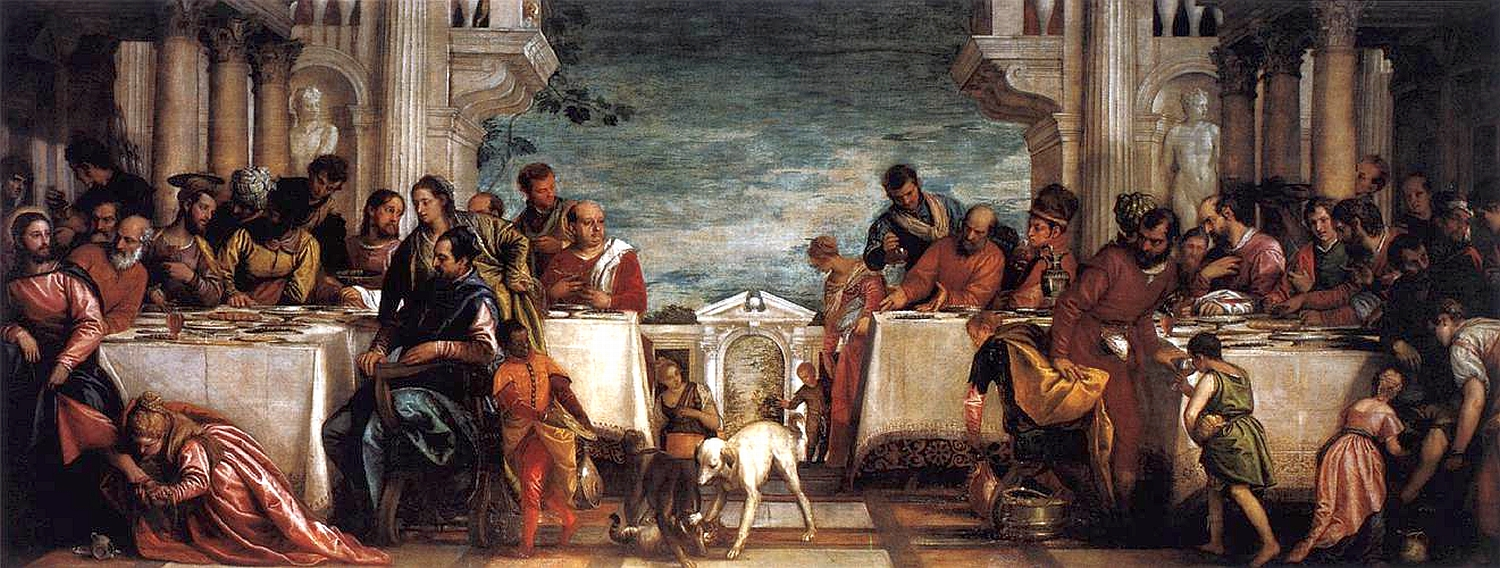
- Artist: Paolo Veronese
- Year: 1570
- Medium: oil on canvas
- Dimensions: 275 cm × 710 cm (108 in × 280 in)
- Location: Pinacoteca di Brera, Milan

The Feast in the House of Simon the Pharisee is an oil-on-canvas painting by Paolo Veronese, completed in 1570 for San Sebastiano, a Hieronymite monastery in Venice. He also produced a cycle of works for the monastery church (still in place), where he was later buried. After the French occupation of Venice in the late 18th century, the monastery was suppressed and its art confiscated. In 1817, after the fall of Napoleon, Feast was assigned to the Pinacoteca di Brera in Milan, where it still hangs.

== History and description ==
From Veronese's mature phase, it was one of a series of monumental "Feasts" for monastery refectories of monasteries in Venice – The Wedding at Cana for San Giorgio Maggiore (now in the Louvre) and another The Feast in the House of Simon the Pharisee for Santi Nazaro e Celso (now in Turin) were earlier works in the series. The Feast in the House of Levi (Gallerie dell'Accademia, Venice, 1573), renamed from a Last Supper to satisfy the objections of the Venetian Holy Inquisition, is the largest and perhaps the best known. They are all framed by huge trompe-l'œil architecture modelled on the contemporary architecture of Palladio, with whom Veronese had collaborated on decorating the Villa Barbaro in Maser.

At the extreme left Mary Magdalene anoints Christ's feet with oil. The huge number of surrounding figures, the scuffle with animals in the centre and the secular details in the work were all cited in Veronese's trial by the Venetian Holy Inquisition in 1573.
