= Ratherius =

10th-century bishop and writer

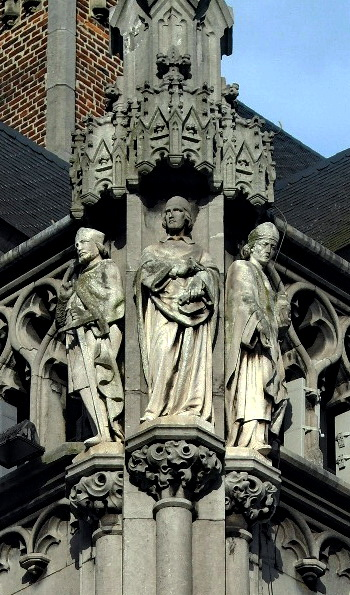
19th-century statue of Ratherius (centre), Palais Provincial, Liège

Ratherius (887×890 – 974), also known as Rathier or Rather of Verona, was a teacher, writer, and bishop. His difficult personality and political activities led to his becoming an exile and a wanderer.

== Early life and career ==
He was born sometime between 887 and 890 into a noble family in the territory of Liège. While still a boy, Ratherius was sent as an oblate to Lobbes Abbey, belonging to the Order of Saint Benedict in the County of Hainaut. He was a diligent student and later became a monk there. At an early age, he was described as being restless, difficult to get along with, ambitious, and overly zealous. Consequently, despite his strict orthodoxy, wide learning, and good conduct, he met with difficulties in every position he assumed and failed to attain lasting success. He spent his life wandering fruitlessly. As presiding bishop, he once commented that if he attempted to enforce the canons against unchaste persons who administered ecclesiastical rites, the Church would be without anyone except boys. Furthermore, if he put into effect canons against bastards, they would also be excluded.

When Abbot Hilduin of Lobbes went in to Italy in 926, he took Ratherius with him as a companion. Hilduin's cousin, Hugh of Italy was the current king, and after many difficulties, Ratherius received the Diocese of Verona from him in 931. Yet he only ruled his see for two years, soon quarrelling with members of his diocese and with the king. The king sent him to prison and had him brought to Como; in 939 he escaped from Como into Provence, becoming a tutor in a noble family until he returned to the Abbey of Lobbes in 944.

In 946 he traveled again to Italy and, after being held for some time as a prisoner by Berengar II of Italy, (opponent of King Hugo), regained the Diocese of Verona. The difficulties that arose were again so great that after two years he fled to Germany and for some time wandered about the country. He took part in the expedition to invade Lombardy with Liudolf, Duke of Swabia, the son of Otto I, Holy Roman Emperor, but was unable to regain his diocese; so in 952, he returned again to Lobbes.

From Lobbes Abbey, Ratherius was called to the cathedral school of Cologne by Archbishop Bruno of Cologne who in 953, gave Ratherius the Diocese of Liège. However, as early as 955, a revolt against him by the nobility obliged Ratherius to give up this see, and he retired to Aulne Abbey. In 962 the Diocese of Verona was restored to him by Emperor Otto but after seven years of constant quarrels he was obliged once more to withdraw. In 968 he went to Lobbes, where he incited such opposition against the Abbot Folcwin that Bishop Notker of Liège restored order by force, and in 972 sent Ratherius back to the Abbey of Aulne, where he remained until his death at Namur on 25 April 974.

== Works ==
Ratherius was also a fine preacher: one of his strengths was his skill in reviving old ideas and making them new again He was one of the first to employ the use of fables to illustrate his sermons, and respected ordinary intelligence, speaking against "swollen rhetoric".

His writings are as unsystematic as his life was changeable and tumultuous. While his style is confused and lacks clarity, his writings generally made reference to particular occasions, and were pamphlets and invectives against his contemporaries. He also wrote complaints against himself in his own affairs. In one of his Verona sermons, Rather mentions reading the Latin poet Catullus in 966, which makes him a figure in the tenuous transmission of Catullus medieval manuscripts.

While imprisoned in Pavia, Ratherius wrote Praeloquia, criticizing all social ranks of the period.

His other writings include:

- Conclusio deliberativa, and Phrensis (twelve books composed during a later time of strife, when Ratherius had been forced to relinquish the episcopal see of Verona), both in defense of his right to the Diocese of Liège
- Dialogus confessionum and Qualitatis conjunctura, a self-accusation
- De contemptu canonum, Synodica, Discordia inter ipsum et clericos, and Liber apologeticus, against the ecclesiastics of his era and in defence of himself

Some of his sermons and letters have also been preserved. The writings shine light upon his era. His works were edited by the brothers Ballerini (Verona, 1765); also in Patrologia Latina, CXXXVI. Unedited letters are to be found in Studi e documenti di storia e diritto (1903) 51–72.

== See also ==
- Raterian iconography

== Sources ==
- Paton, Ker William (May 1958). The Dark Ages. Mentor Books. p. 117.
- "Catholic Celibacy". The Saturday Review.
- Rossi, Mariaclara (2016). "RATERIO". Dizionario Biografico degli Italiani (in Italian). Vol. 86: Querenghi–Rensi. Rome: Institute of the Italian Encyclopaedia. ISBN 978-88-12-00032-6.
