= Raterian iconography =

Oldest depiction of the city of Verona, Italy

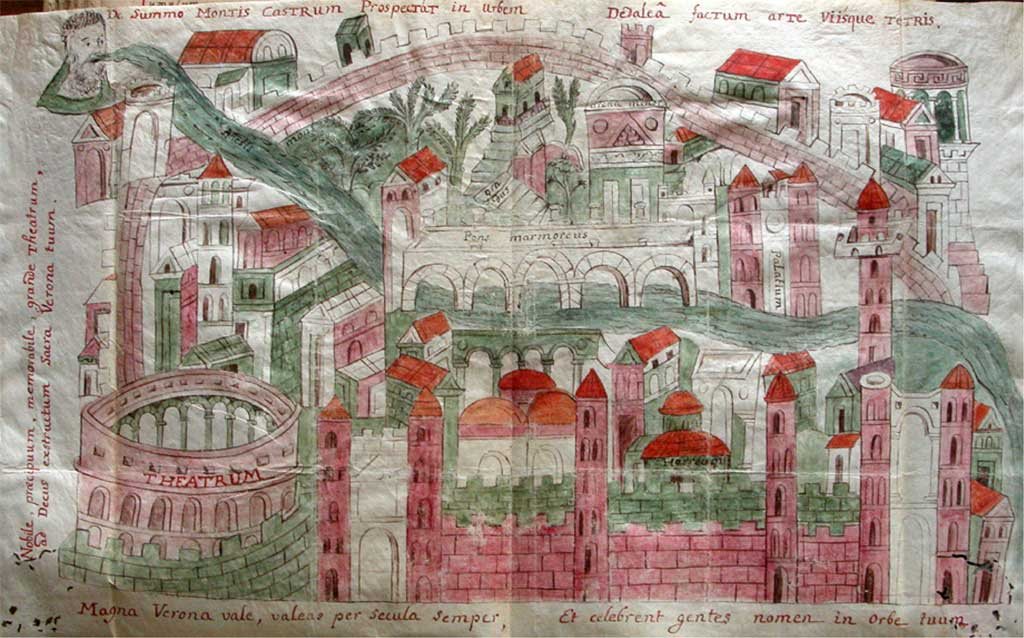
Raterian iconography, copy made by Scipione Maffei.

The Raterian iconography or Civitas Veronensis Depicta is the oldest known depiction of the city of Verona. Dating from the first half of the 10th century, it was found by a Benedictine monk from Lobbes Abbey (Belgium) in a medieval codex that also contained the Rhythmus Pipinianus. That codex had belonged to Ratherius, bishop of the Verona between July 932 and 968. Since the codex was lost following the passage of French revolutionary troops, the one that exists today is a copy made by Scipione Maffei, an 18th-century scholar from Verona.

In the aftermath of Scipione Maffei's demise in 1755, his copies were bequeathed to the Chapter Library of Verona, where they are currently housed. Specifically, the Versus de Verona and the Iconography, which were transmitted in 1739, are located on cc. 187r-188v and on the final folio of the codex. A few years later, in 1752, a merchant from Aachen facilitated the acquisition of a copy of the Rhythmus in praise of Verona and the Iconography by Giovanni Battista Biancolini, who printed both in 1757 in the volume Dei vescovi e governatori di Verona, pp. 115–119.

The preparatory papers, particularly those that presented the reproduction of the drawing with the plan of Verona, are now lost. The Maffeian apograph, dating from 1739 and currently housed in the Chapter Library, and that of Biancolini, discovered in 1752 and published in 1757, provide the basis for the reconstruction of the drawing once housed in the Monastery of Lobbes, which was destroyed in 1793-1794.

The Iconography is an ideal representation of Verona, evoking the city's image in the imagination of Bishop Ratherius. When observing the Iconography, one perceives Verona through the lens of a 10th-century intellectual, centered on the Adige River and Ponte Pietra, with the Roman Theater, the Arena, and several other structures depicted along the periphery. This image is contrasted with other traces of Verona's past, such as the Antiquities of Verona by the painter Giovanni Caroto and the Antiquitates veronenses by Onofrio Panvinio: printed works that describe the ancient monuments of the city with the help of a rich iconographic apparatus.

The iconography also contains the following description of the Arena of Verona:

De summo montis Castrum prospectat in urbem

Dedalea factum arte viisque tetris

nobile, praecipuum, memorabile, grande theatrum,

ad decus exstructum, sacra Verona, tuum.

Magna Verona, vale, valeas per secula semper

et celebrent gentes nomen in orbe tuum.

From the top of the hill, the castle overlooks the city,
with dark galleries and art worthy of Daedalus,
the noble, distinguished, memorable, great theater [the Arena],
built according to your prestige, sacred Verona.
Great Verona, farewell, you live forever through the centuries
and may all the nations of the world celebrate your name.

—Civitas Veronensis depicta or Raterian iconography

== See also ==
- History of Verona
- Churches of Verona
- Versus de Verona

== Bibliography ==
- Venturini, Leonardo (2013). Santo Stefano in Verona. Verona: Scripta edizioni. ISBN 978-88-96162-94-1.
