= The Feast in the House of Simon the Pharisee (Veronese, Turin) =

Painting by Paolo Veronese

- Cena in casa di Simone il fariseo (Italian)
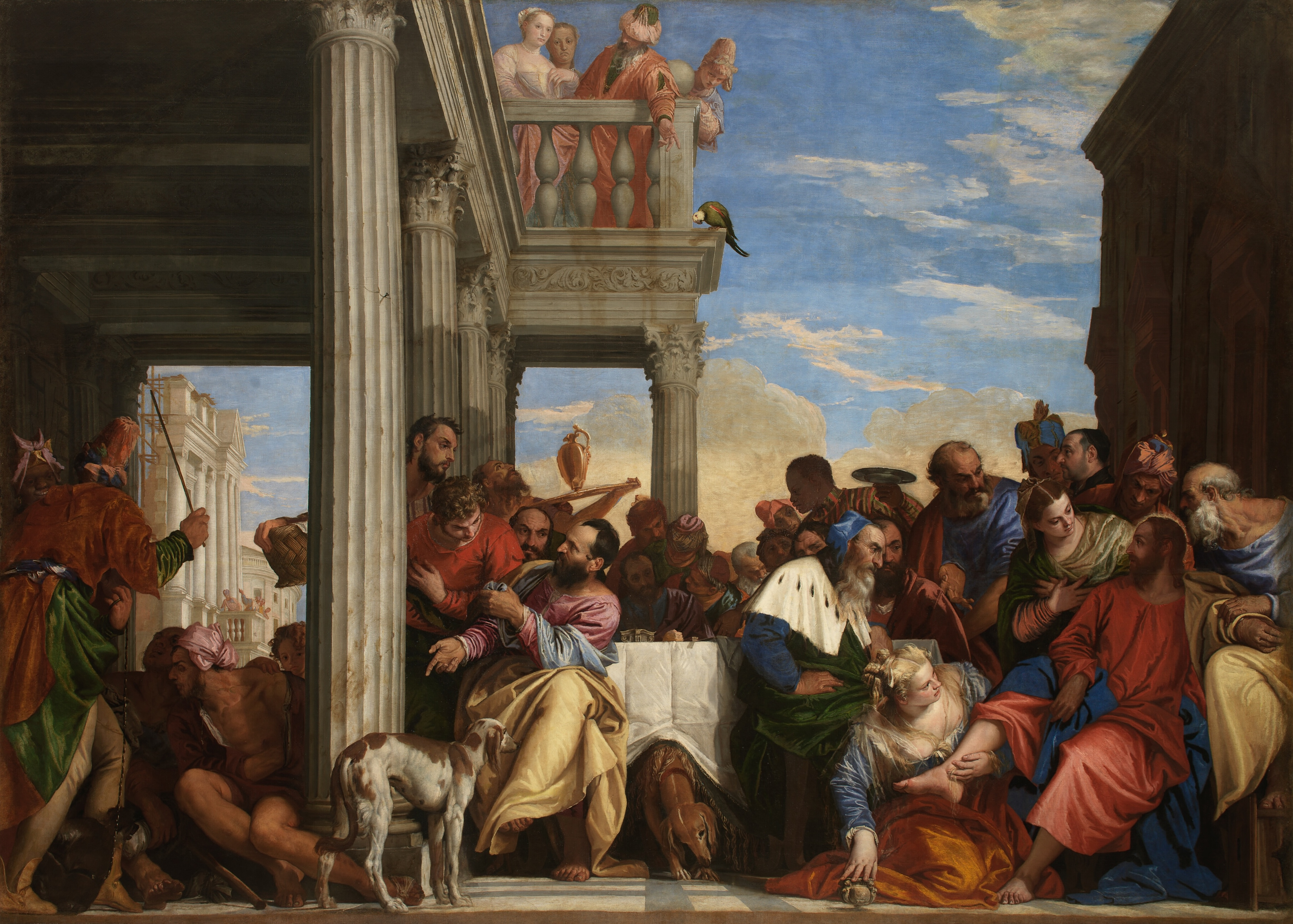
- Artist: Paolo Veronese
- Year: c. 1555–1556
- Medium: Oil on canvas
- Dimensions: 314 cm × 451 cm (124 in × 178 in)
- Location: Galleria Sabauda, Turin

The Feast in the House of Simon the Pharisee is a c. 1555–56 oil-on-canvas painting by the Italian Renaissance artist Paolo Veronese, now in the Galleria Sabauda, Turin.

The work was commissioned by the monks of Santi Nazaro e Celso in Verona for their refectory It was one of a series of monumental "Feasts" for monastery refectories of monasteries in Venice - The Wedding at Cana for San Giorgio Maggiore (now in the Louvre) and another The Feast in the House of Simon the Pharisee (now in the Pinacoteca di Brera, Milan) were other works in the series
