= Antonio Badile =

Italian painter

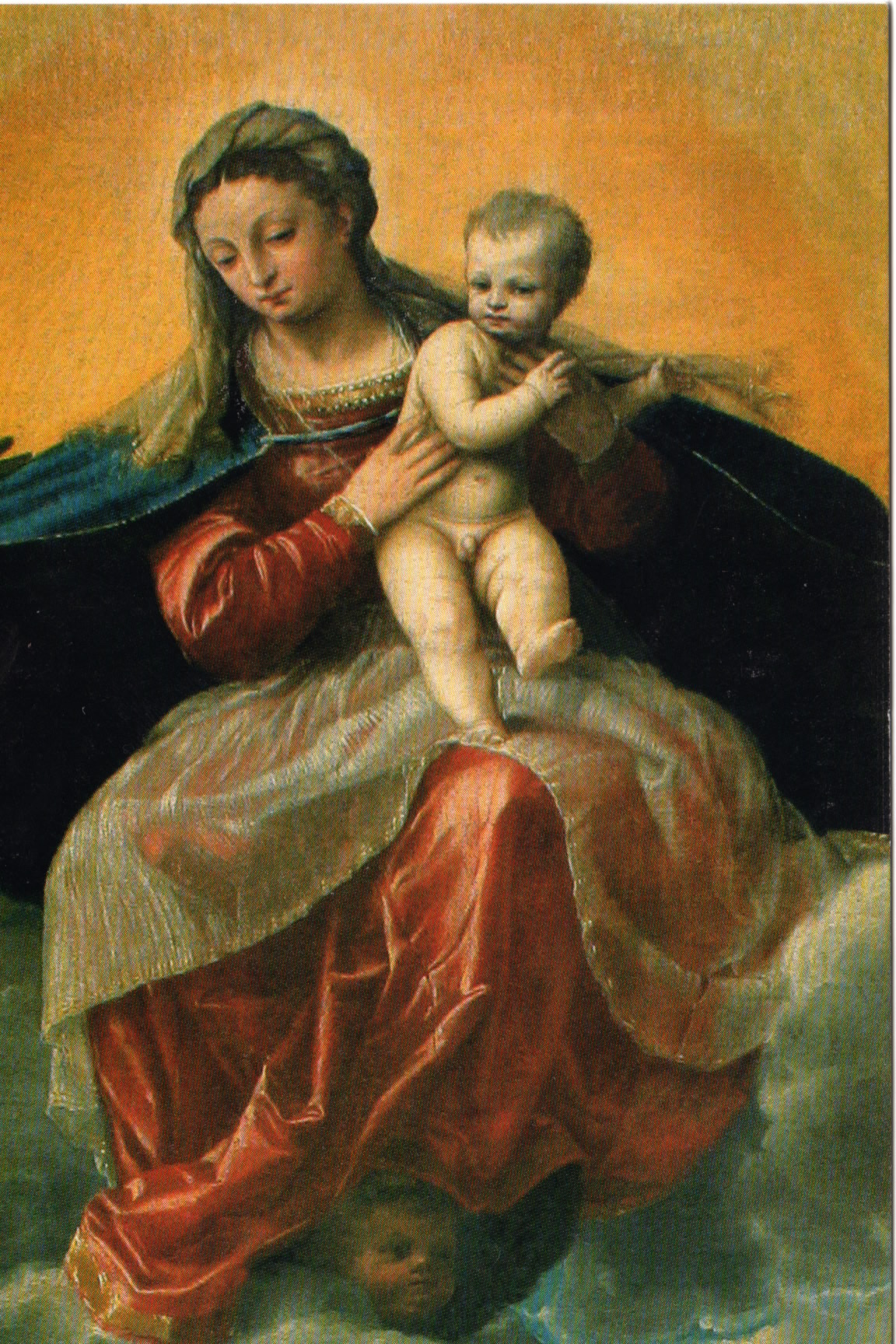
The Blessed Virgin Mary with her Son and S. Battista, Antonio Abate, Benedetto, Biagio (detail), Verona, SS. Nazaro and Celso Church

Antonio Badile (c. 1518 – 1560) was an Italian painter from Verona.

== Biography ==
He was the grandson of the Veronese 15th-century painter Giovanni Badile. He trained with his uncle Francesco Badile (died 1544). He was the first master of Paolo Veronese, and later his father-in-law. Veronese later moved to train with Giovanni Francesco Caroto. Badile also trained Giovanni Battista Zelotti. Badile is described as continuing the "retardataire" tradition of Caroto well past the 1540s. His masterpiece is the altarpiece for Santi Nazaro e Celso of a Madonna and Saints (1540); another notable work is his Resurrection of Lazarus for the chapel of Santa Croce in the church of San Bernardino. Other works are found in towns of the Veneto.

He was partially influenced by the Brescian painter Alessandro Bonvicino (called il Moretto).
