= Piazza Bra =

Square in Verona, Italy

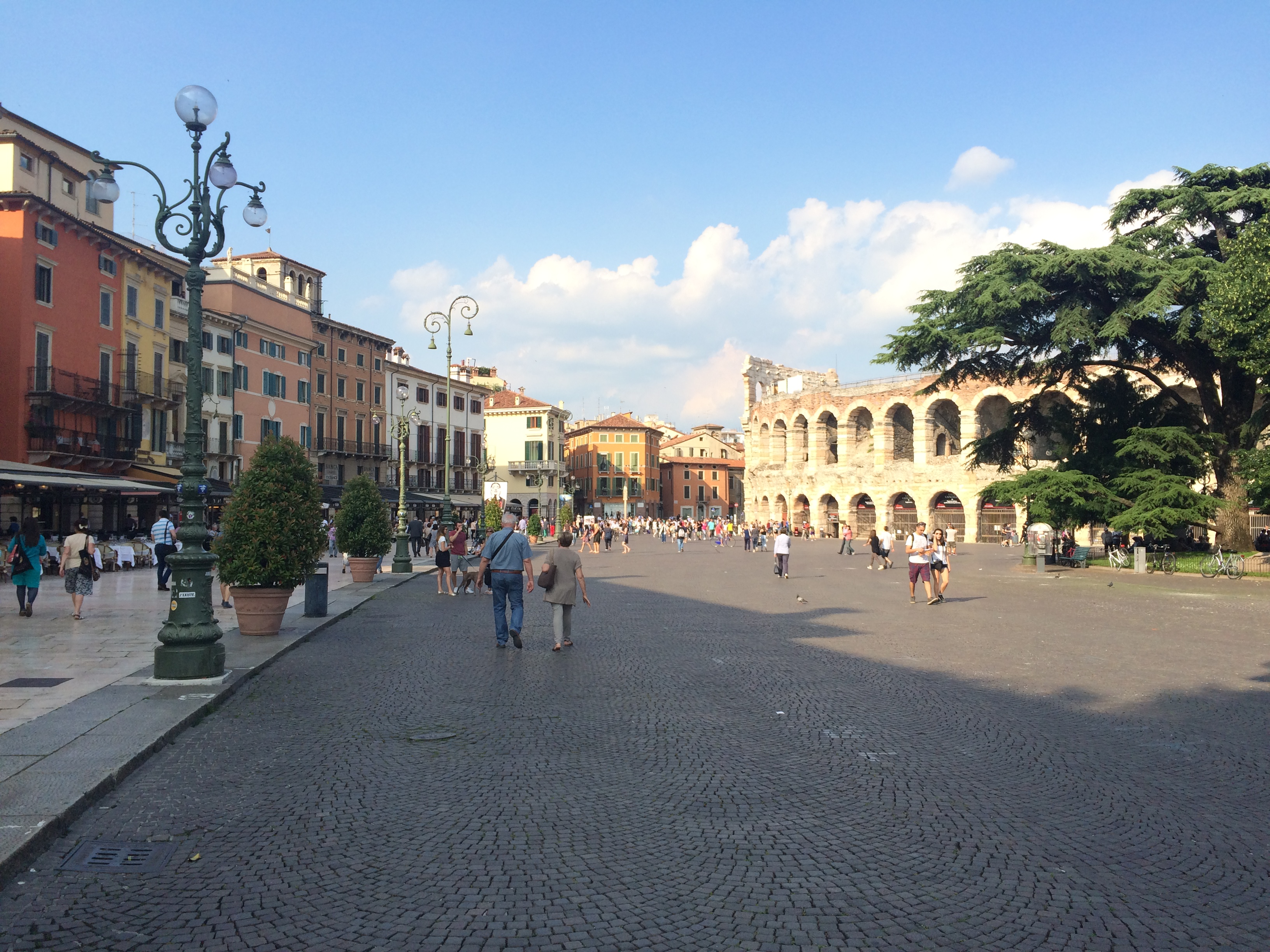
- Country: Italy
- City: Verona
- District: Città antica
- Postal code: 37122
- Type: Square
- Intersections: Via Mazzini and Corso Porta Nuova
- Places of interest: Verona Arena, Gran Guardia, Palazzo Barbieri, Palazzo degli Honorij and Maffeian Lapidary Museum

Map
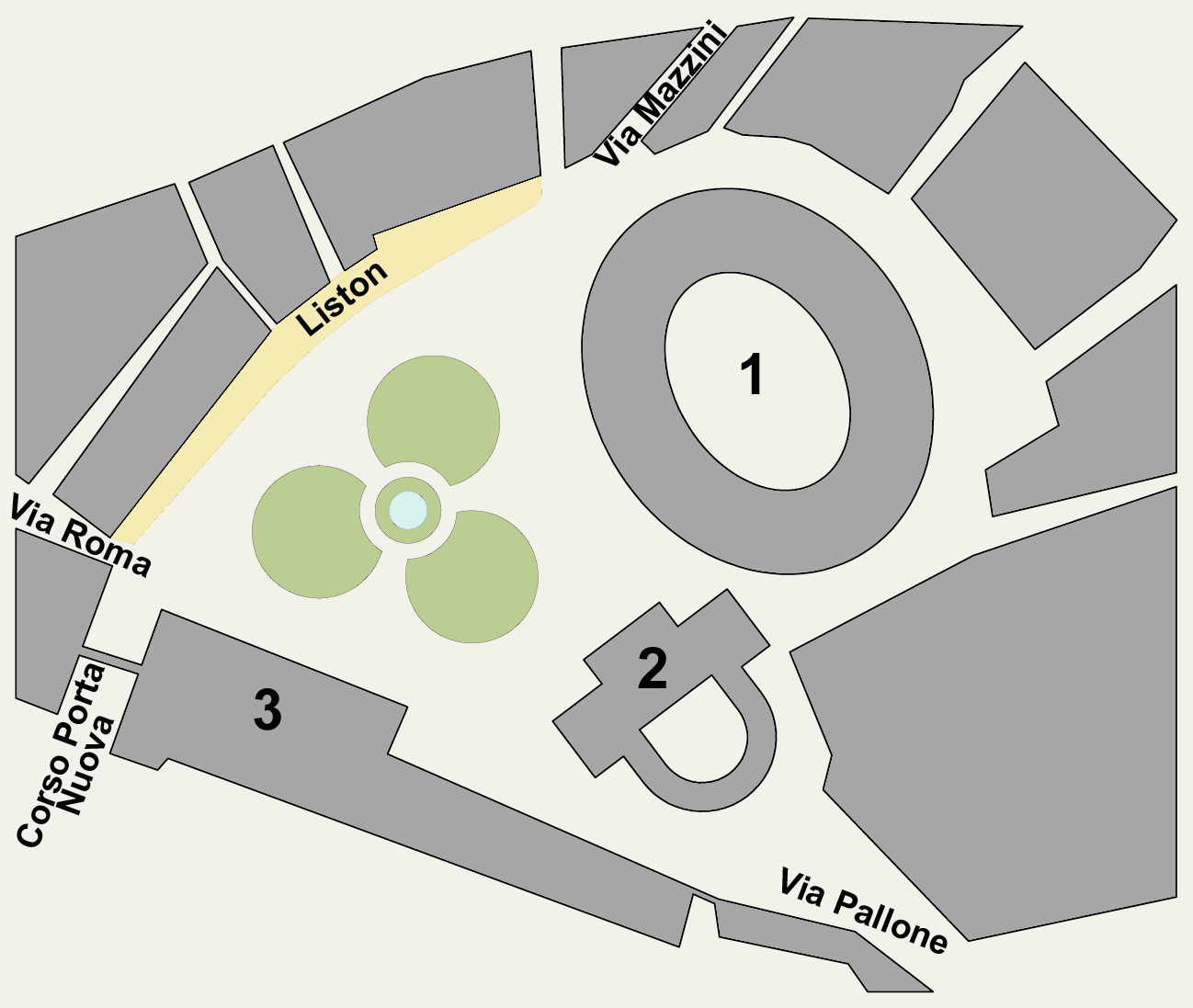
- Layout plan of Piazza Bra. 1: Verona Arena; 2: Palazzo Barbieri; 3: Gran Guardia

Piazza Bra, often simply called The Bra, is the largest public square in Verona, Italy, situated in its historic city center. The name "Bra" derives from a corruption of braida, a term rooted in the Lombardic word breit, meaning 'wide' or 'broad'.

The open space of the Bra began transforming into a defined square in the early 16th century, when architect Michele Sanmicheli completed the Palazzo degli Honorij. This building delineated the western boundary of the future square and established a proper perspective toward the Verona Arena. The first effort to convert the unpaved expanse into a leisurely promenade came from podestà Alvise Mocenigo, who sought to create a gathering place for Verona's emerging bourgeoisie. In 1770, he inaugurated the initial section of the Liston, a paved sidewalk flanking the Bra, linking Corso Porta Nuova to Via Mazzini. The Gran Guardia, begun by the Venetians in the 17th century and completed by the Austrians in the 19th century, defined the southern edge. In 1836, architect Giuseppe Barbieri designed the eastern boundary, where an old hospital, several houses, and a small church were demolished to make way for the Gran Guardia Nuova, now better known as Palazzo Barbieri. Initially used as an Austrian barracks, it became Verona's municipal headquarters following the annexation of Veneto to the Kingdom of Italy.

== History ==
=== Origins ===
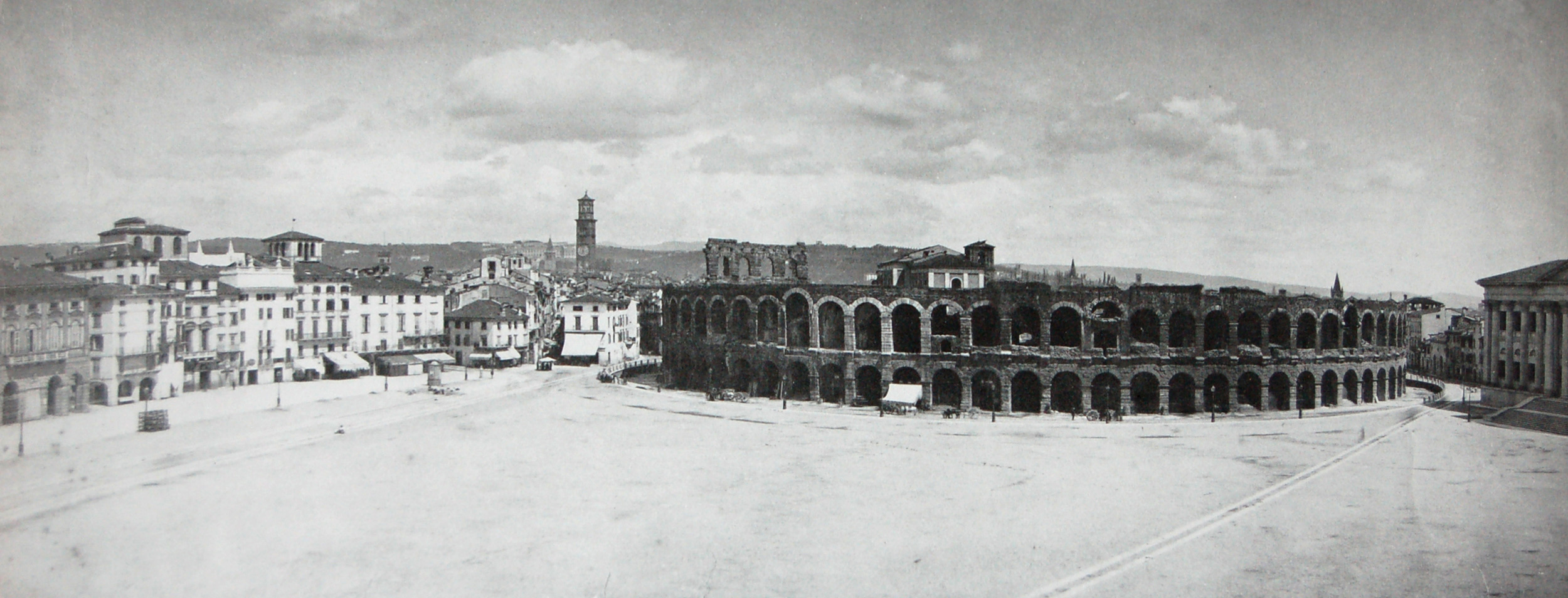
A late 19th-century photograph of the Bra by Moritz Lotze

During Roman times, this area lay outside the city walls and was relatively distant from major thoroughfares. It wasn't until the 1st century AD, with the construction of the Roman amphitheater now known as the Verona Arena, that the northern edge of what would centuries later become a principal city square took shape. In 305, Emperor Galerius, during a brief stay in Verona, ordered a new gate opened in the wall encircling the amphitheater, a fortification built in 265 by Emperor Gallienus. This created an initial link between the city and the open space beyond.

The square's form began to emerge more clearly in the Middle Ages. Between 1130 and 1153, the city's walls were expanded to encompass this area, placing it between the Roman walls and the newer municipal walls. These enclosed spaces were termed "braide," from the Lombardic breit; in the 12th century, the braida corresponding to today's Piazza Bra was far larger than its current boundaries. A gate known as "della Braida," located along the municipal walls, is first mentioned in a 1257 document, but it was later replaced by the Portoni della Bra, likely commissioned by the Visconti and completed by the Venetians. The first arch dates to the late 14th century, the second to the mid-15th century. The clock between the arches, a gift from Count Antonio Nogarola in 1871, was installed with dials visible on both sides of the walls—toward the piazza and Corso Porta Nuova. Inaugurated on June 2, 1872, it was repaired in 1879 due to inaccuracy.

=== Development ===
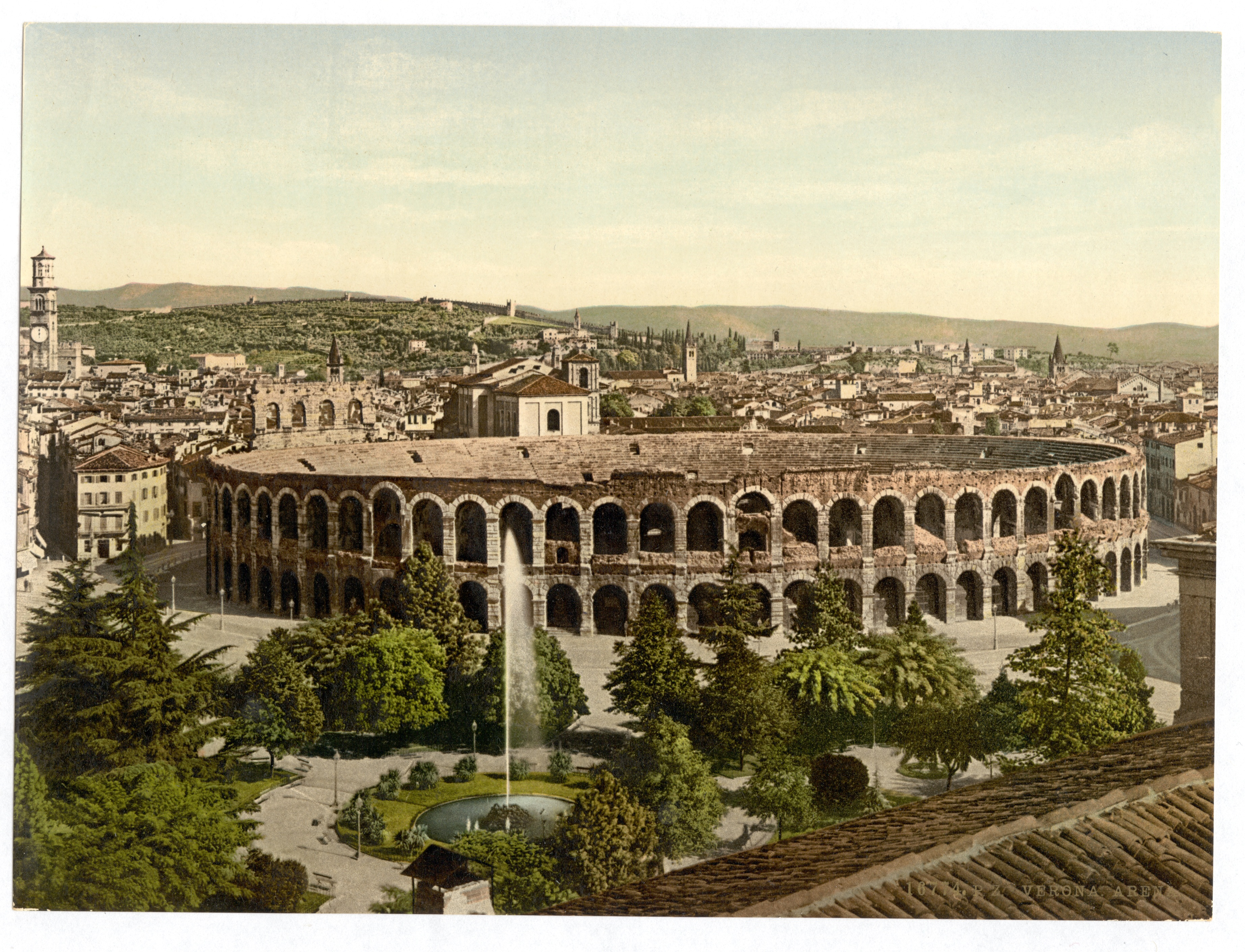
The Bra after the central area was landscaped into gardens

The Bra started to take shape as a proper square in the early 17th century, when construction began on the southern side with the Gran Guardia and the headquarters of the Accademia Filarmonica di Verona. Alongside the Gran Guardia's construction, the square was leveled as much as possible, with slopes added to manage rainwater runoff—an innovation, as the space had previously been a rough yard for stonemasons to work and store debris, as well as a dumping ground for materials from nearby construction sites.

For another 150 years, the area remained unpaved earth until 1770, when podestà Alvise Mocenigo laid the foundations for the Liston. On March 13, 1782, Francesco Menegatti submitted a plan to complete the Liston's paving, which the municipality approved. This final touch made the Bra the preferred spot for afternoon strolls, eclipsing Piazza dei Signori. In his essay Italian Journey, Goethe vividly described the scene: “I walked at sunset upon the margin of the craterlike Amphitheatre, and enjoyed the most splendid prospect over the town and the surrounding country. I was quite alone, and multitudes of people were passing below me on the hard stones of the Bra. Men of all ranks, and women of the middle ranks, were walking.”

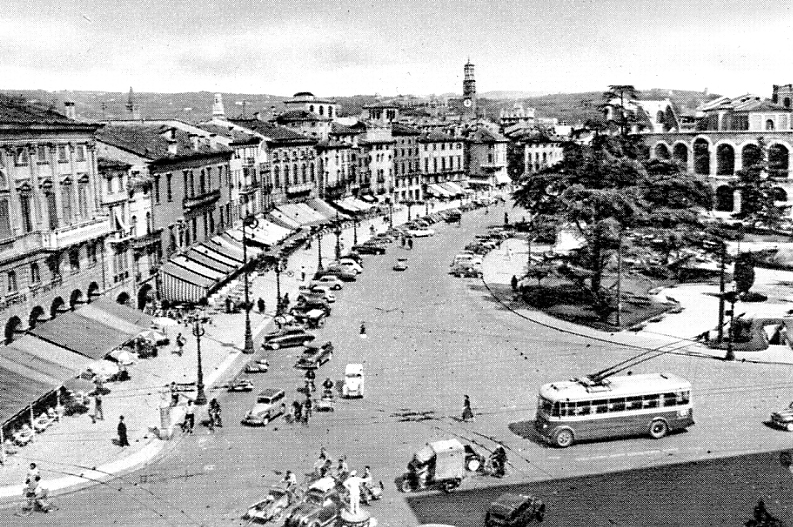
The square in the mid-20th century

The square was leveled multiple times and underwent numerous enhancements. In 1808, architect Luigi Trezza was tasked with redoing the Liston, and in 1820, excavations around the amphitheater uncovered its base, buried about two meters deep due to sediment from the city's frequent floods. During this project, the Bra's average level was lowered by roughly 70 centimeters, sloping gently from the Gran Guardia toward the Arena, with the Liston's height adjusted accordingly.

Until the 18th century, the Bra was shrouded in darkness at night. Oil lamps were introduced in the 19th century, followed by gas lighting in 1845, making the Liston a venue for evening walks as well. The square's completion came in 1873 with the landscaping of its central area into gardens, featuring three circular flowerbeds forming a triangle around a fountain. Between 1884 and 1951, the square also hosted tracks for Verona's tram network.

=== Events ===
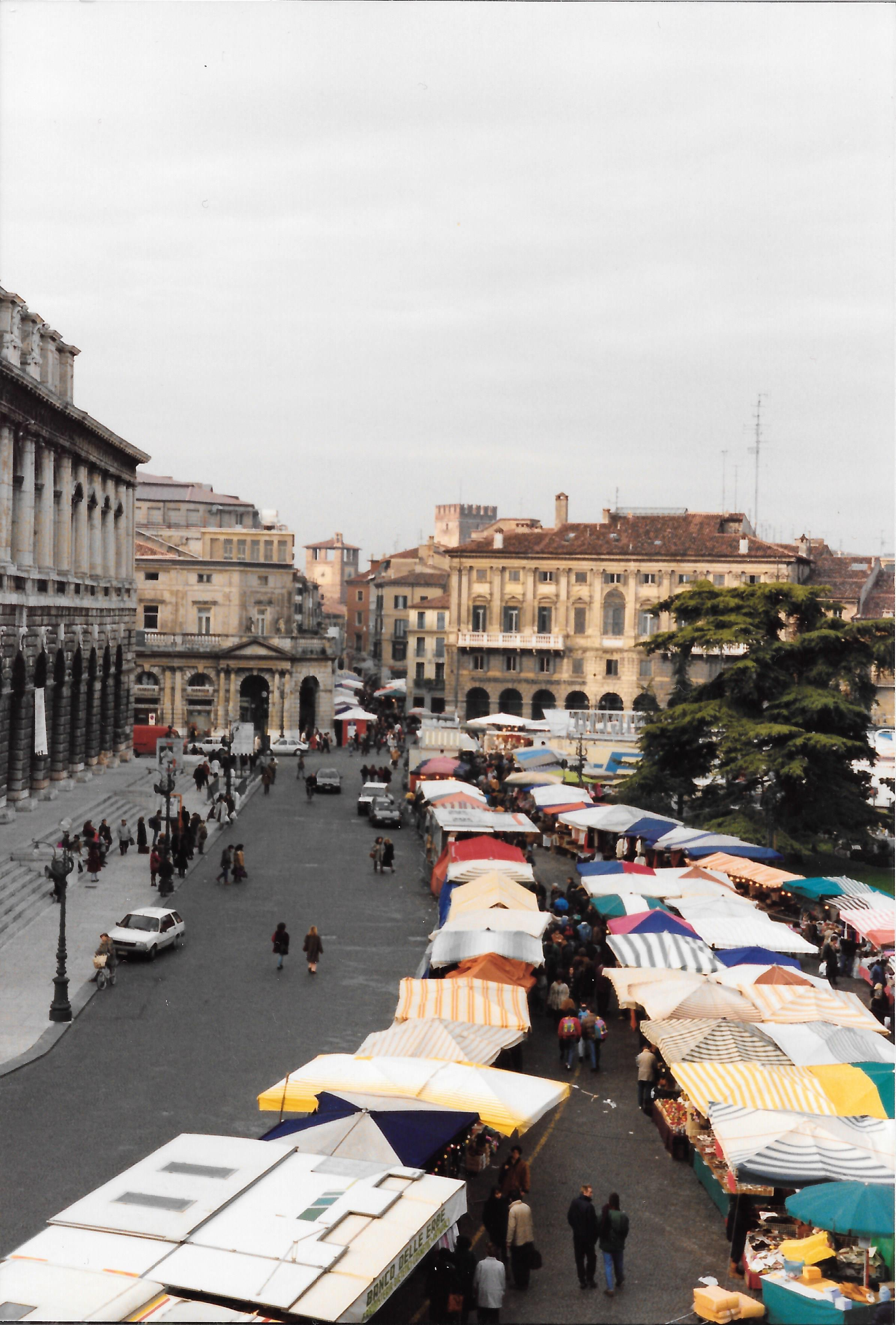
The Bra during the Santa Lucia fair

After being enclosed within the municipal walls in the 12th century, this space hosted markets for timber, hay, straw, and livestock, earning it the name "Foro Boario" in old records. More commonly, it was called "Piazza d’Armi," as Venetian troops were reviewed here from the outset of their rule—a role that made it a battleground between Venetian and French soldiers during the Veronese Easter in 1797. From 1633, after the Venetian Senate approved a goods fair, two annual 15-day fairs were held until one was destroyed by fire on October 28, 1712, and relocated. A new fair was established in 1822, lasting in Piazza Bra for about 20 years.

A much older tradition, still alive today, is the Saint Lucy fair, held annually from December 11 to 13. Legend holds that during the communal era, an epidemic struck Verona, affecting the eyes. Citizens vowed to pilgrimage to the Church of Santa Lucia. When children resisted, they were promised gifts in their shoes upon return. The miracle occurred, and the fair has since coincided with Saint Lucy's feast day.

With the Liston’s completion, the Bra became Verona's favored promenade, as a stunned chronicler from the 1837 Esperia magazine described:

…the Liston is the Veronese’s public promenade, a vast open space rare among cities. Here, businessmen find respite and comforting conversation, idlers amuse themselves, and beauties flock to receive admiring glances and sighs from their suitors. Numerous cafés offer brilliant, ample hospitality to the gatherings that convene there. Roaming musicians and improvisers—admittedly not very pleasing, yet always warmly received by the lively locals—break the chatter’s monotony, while the garrison’s military bands greatly enhance the enjoyment. In fine weather, it’s a delight to see thousands of men and women seated beneath and before the portico, a lively crowd weaving through the paths between rows of chairs—sometimes bowing, sometimes pausing near some beauty, exchanging envious compliments and words of hope—while the beauties cast cautious glances, seeking, amid the cheerful throng, the greeting of their dearest with poorly concealed impatience…

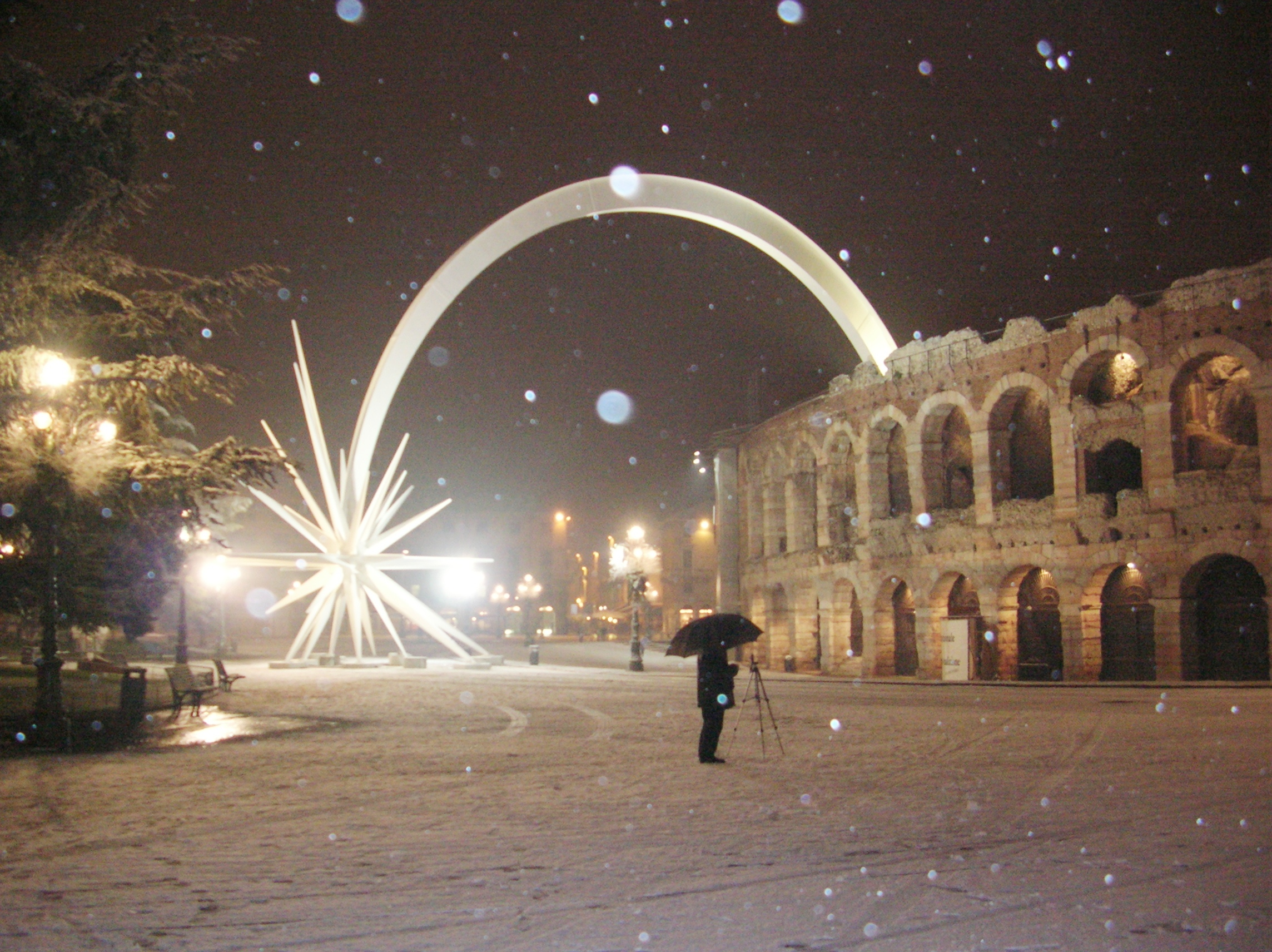
Verona's comet star during a snowy night

During the Christmas season, the Arena’s arches host the International Nativity Scene Exhibition, launched in 1984 by Alfredo Troisi. Accompanying it is the comet star, an event symbol stretching from the Arena’s basin into the Bra. Over time, the star has gained independent significance, cherished in its own right. Designed by architect and set designer Rinaldo Olivieri, it was inspired by a city map highlighting two voids—the Arena’s auditorium and the square before it. From this, he envisioned a grand arc of light and steel linking the musical temple to the urban space, descending among the people.

== Description ==
Formed over centuries, Piazza Bra is defined on each side by significant architecture. To the north stands the ancient Roman amphitheater; to the west, a row of palaces from the 15th to 18th centuries lines the Liston promenade; to the south rises the Gran Guardia, begun by Venetians and finished by Austrians; and to the east is the 19th-century Gran Guardia Nuova, better known as Palazzo Barbieri, Verona’s city hall.

=== Arena ===
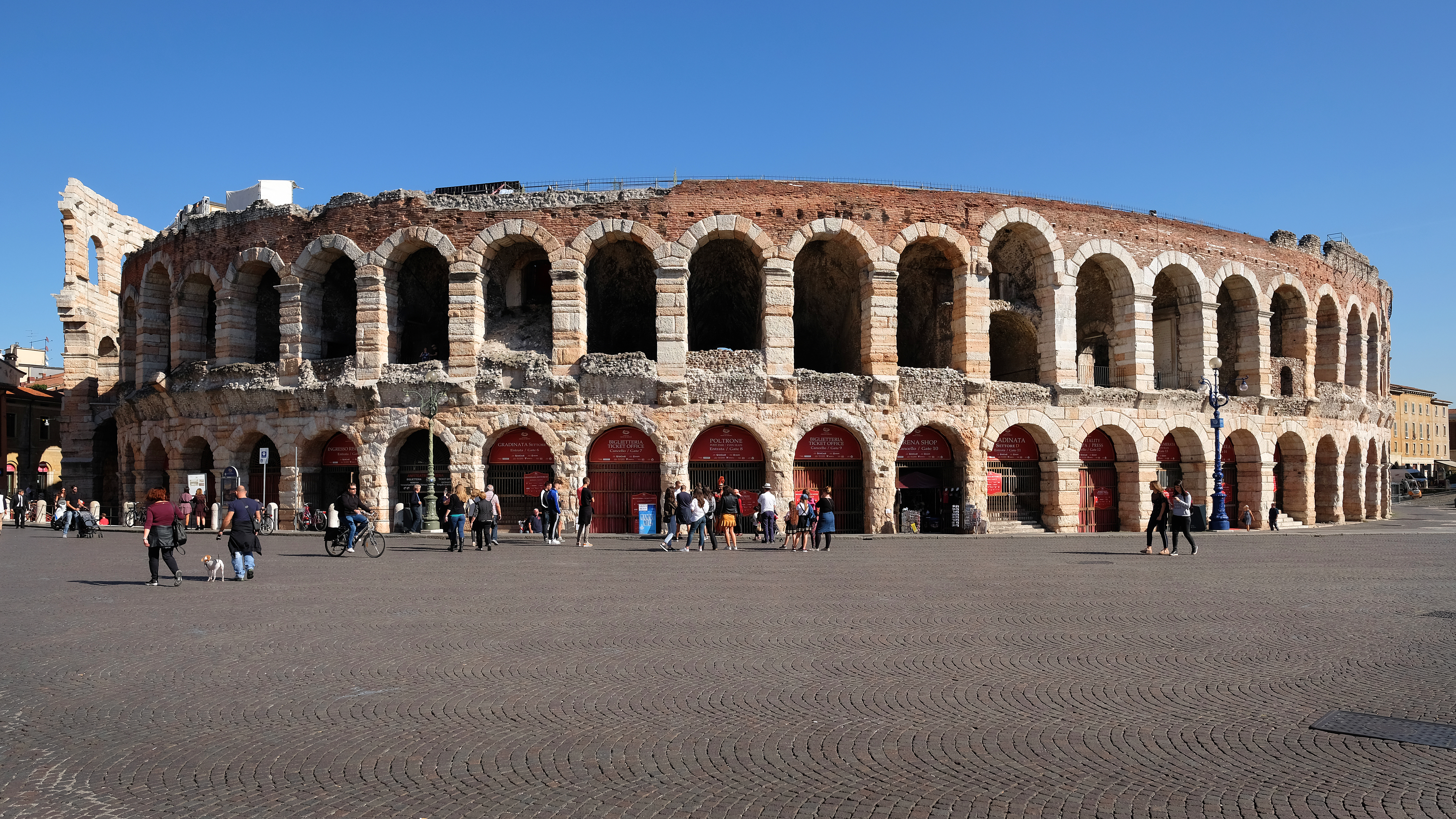
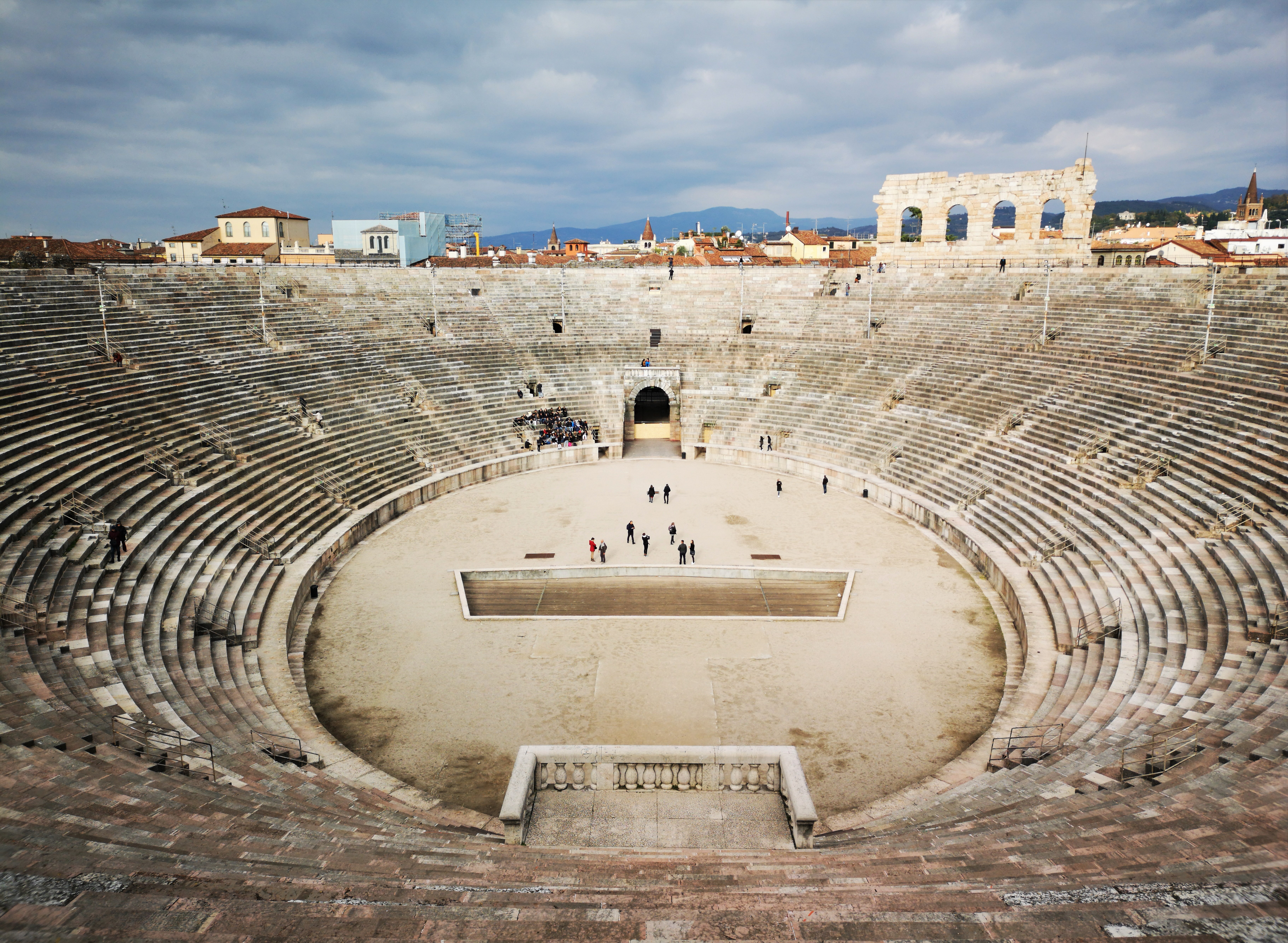
The Arena’s façade on the Bra and its interior

The absence of written records about the amphitheater’s inauguration makes precise dating challenging, though it is now widely accepted to have been built in the 1st century AD. Historians studying archaeological finds, such as statues that once adorned it, place its construction between 10 and 20 AD, from late in Augustus’s reign to early in Tiberius’s. Given that statues were typically added upon completion, historian Pirro Marconi suggests the Arena was finished around 30 AD.

The arena measures 250 x 150 Roman feet, or 75.68 m x 44.43 m, with a 5:3 ratio of major to minor axes. Its total diameter is 152.43 m x 123.23 m (520 x 420 Roman feet), and the auditorium spans 39.40 m (125 feet). Today’s appearance differs from the original due to the missing outer ring; the inner façade lacks the third gallery, preserved only in the “wing”—four arches, the sole remnant of the outer wall. Recent estimates for summer performances put the capacity at 22,000, though the stage occupies about a third of the seats, and the upper portico is gone. In Roman times, it likely held up to 30,000.

The Arena di Verona Festival, launched in 1913 with Giuseppe Verdi’s Aida to mark his centennial, brought global attention. Attendees included luminaries like Giacomo Puccini, Arrigo Boito, Pietro Mascagni, and a then little-known Franz Kafka. The Arena also launched Maria Callas’s operatic career with her debut in Amilcare Ponchielli’s La Gioconda.

=== Palaces along the Liston ===
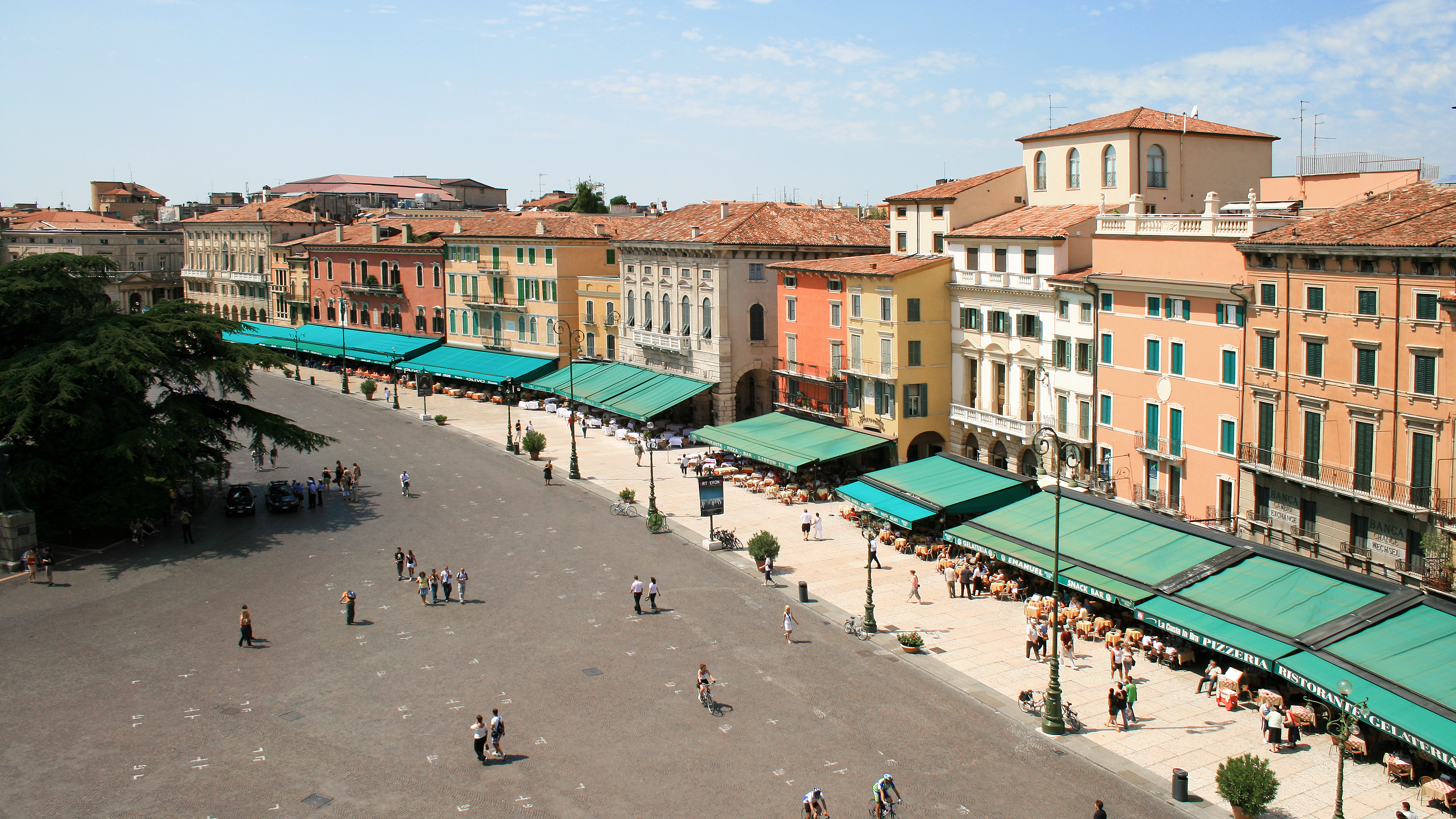
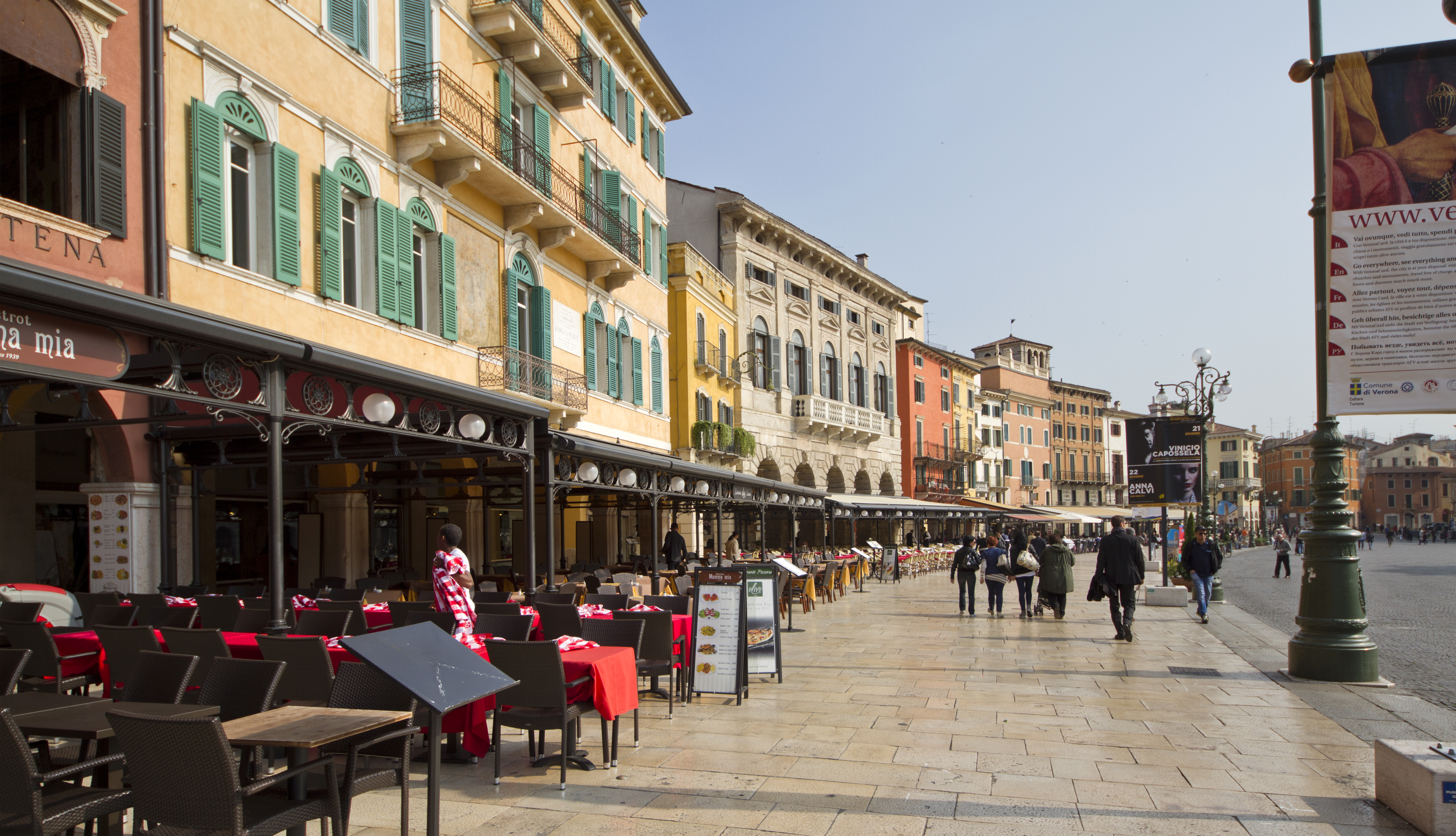
The Liston promenade

Along the Bra's western edge, a series of palaces line the Liston, the traditional strolling path. Starting nearest the Portoni della Bra, the 18th-century Palazzo Ottolini, designed by Michelangelo Castellazzi, stands at Via Roma's corner. Next is the 15th-century Palazzo Guglienzi-Brognoligo, a Renaissance-style building with a façade fresco by Francesco Morone. It long housed the Società Letteraria, one of Italy's oldest reading societies, counting members like Aleardo Aleardi, Cesare Lombroso, Carlo Montanari, and Ippolito Pindemonte. Adjacent is the 15th-century Palazzo Fracasso-Giafilippi, adorned with a fresco by Caroto. Beyond a narrow alley, Vicolo Liston, stands the mid-16th-century Palazzo degli Honorij, designed by renowned Veronese architect Michele Sanmicheli. Further along are homes once owned by the Faccioli, Cagnoli, Arrighi, Marastoni, and Rubiani families. The first building without a portico, designed by Luigi Trezza in 1790, appears somewhat awkward with its oversized columned windows and heavy lintels on a short façade. The final 16th-century residence now hosts the Società Letteraria.

To the right of the Portoni della Bra, separated by Via Roma but aligned with the Liston palaces, a large 17th-century structure houses the headquarters of the Accademia Filarmonica. Its courtyard, fronting a columned Ionic vestibule, holds ancient inscriptions and reliefs—the earliest items in the Maffeian Lapidary Museum's collection, founded by Scipione Maffei.

=== Gran Guardia ===
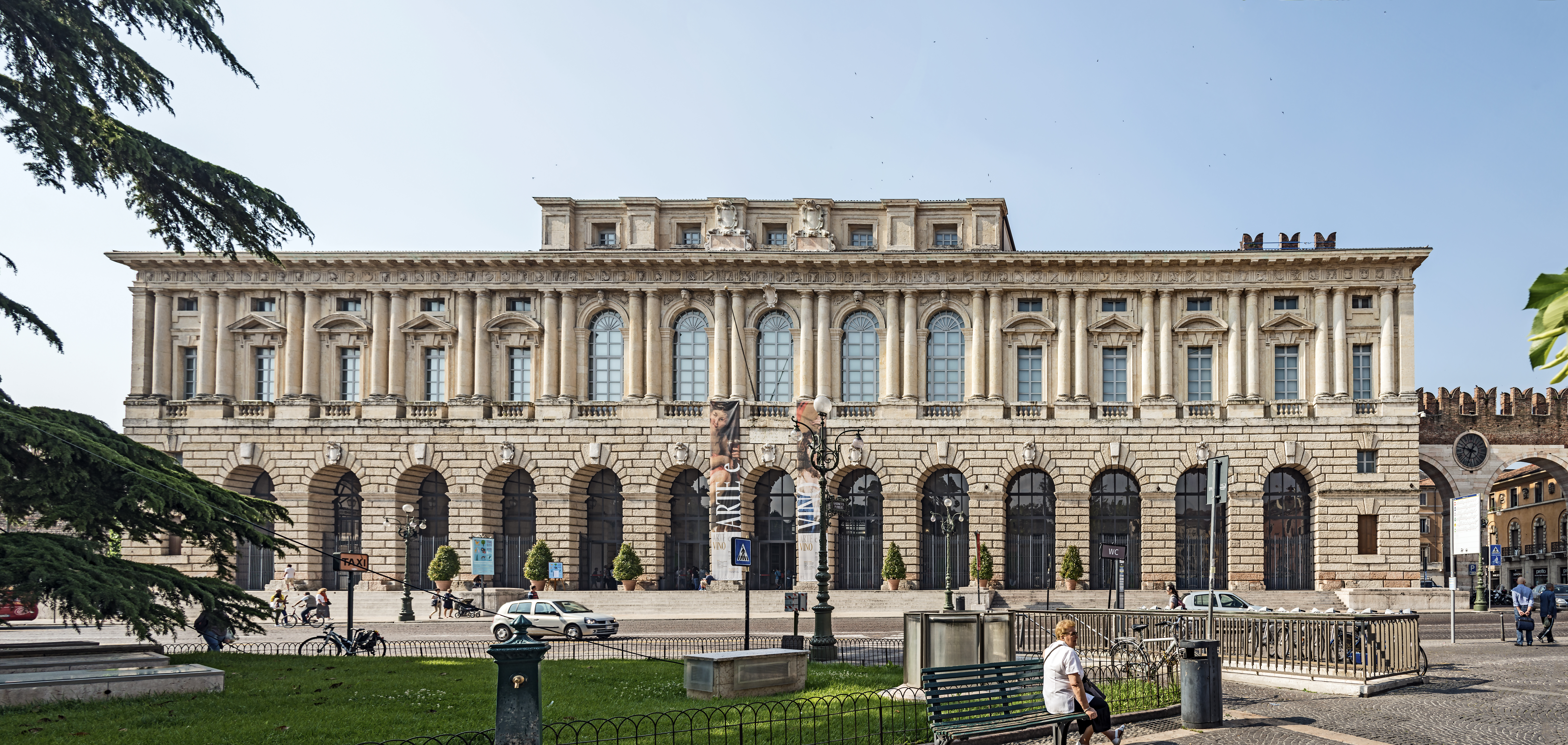
The Gran Guardia seen from the garden

The first structure on the Bra's southern edge, along the walls bordering the Visconti Citadel, was a small 16th-century munitions depot. On December 26, 1606, Verona's rector Zuanne Mocenigo wrote to Doge Leonardo Donato, noting the need for a covered space to review troops during rain. The doge approved, and Mocenigo commissioned Domenico Curtoni, nephew of Michele Sanmicheli, to design it. Curtoni's plan featured a pillared, roofed building abutting the Citadel walls, using them as one side to cut costs and time. Work began in 1610 but halted in 1614 due to funding shortages, leaving the structure incomplete.

In 1808, architect Giuseppe Barbieri was tasked with finishing it, but funds remained elusive, and control shifted from the French to the Austrians. Construction resumed in 1819, with the façade completed by mid-1820, though interior work dragged on for decades. By 1848, it was nearly finished when Austrian troops occupied it during the First Italian War of Independence. Completion came in 1853. The building features a 13-arch lower portico with striking chiaroscuro effects and an upper level of 15 windows with triangular and curved pediments, separated by paired classical columns.

=== Palazzo Barbieri ===
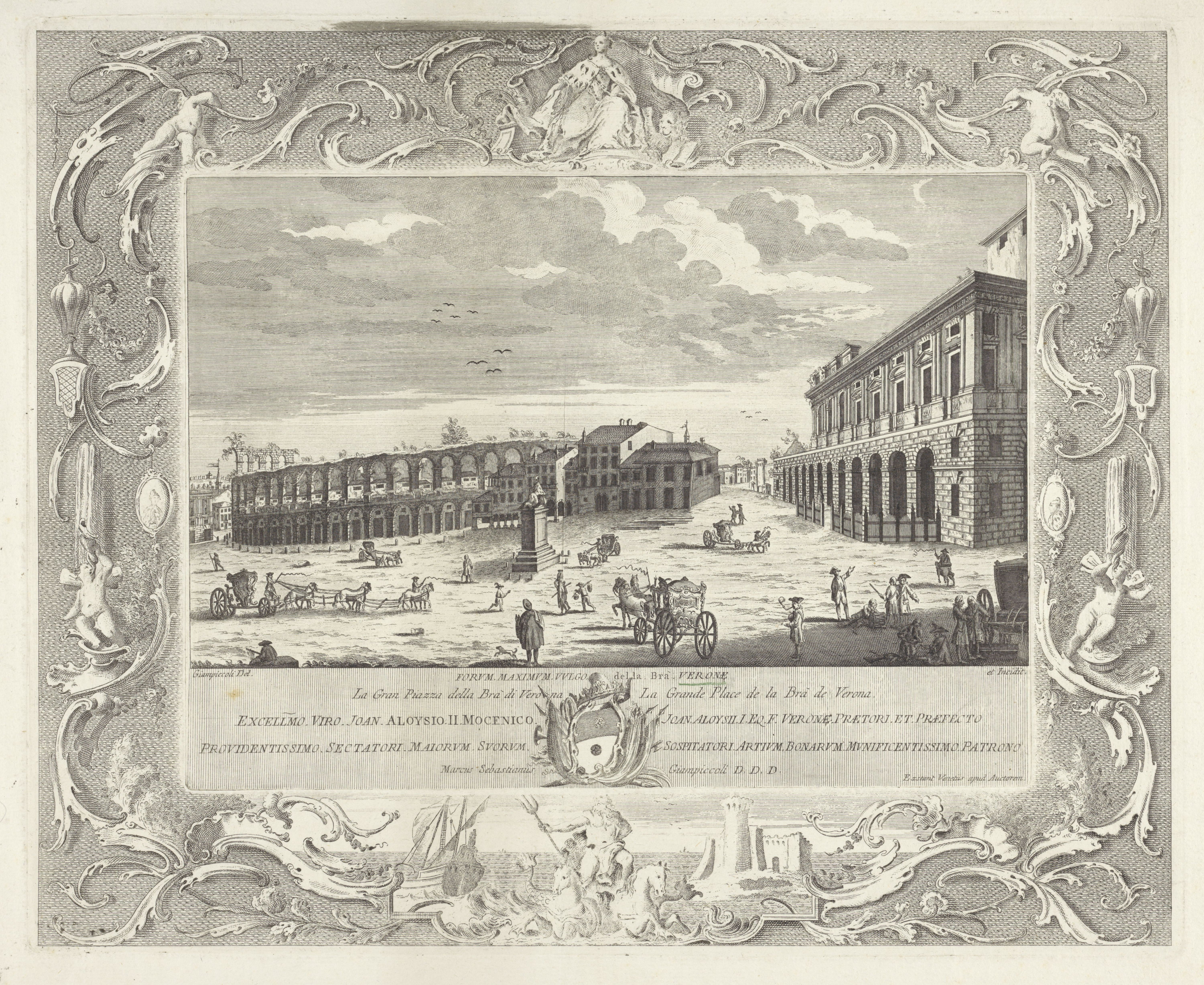
A mid-18th-century depiction of the Bra, with the Sant’Agnese district center (later Palazzo Barbieri), the Roman amphitheater on the left, and the unfinished Gran Guardia on the right

The Bra's eastern side once held the Sant’Agnese district, including its namesake church. In 1478, an emergency plague shelter was built nearby, lasting four centuries. Chronicles recount that in 1515, a citizen aided prostitutes from the district, housing them nearby. Others joined him, buying a house and equipping it as a hospital. The municipality later granted an adjacent building, and on March 1, 1520, it was officially recognized as the Ospedale della Santa Casa della Misericordia.

In 1780, a commission proposed a new hospital at the Bra's center, near the city's densest areas. Approved, it was completed by 1786 with a trapezoidal layout: 16 shops on the ground floor, the first floor as a hospital, and the second as a dormitory and refectory for “orphans, the abandoned, and beggars.” Named Ospedale della Misericordia Nuova, it distinguished itself from the older facility by Sant’Agnese, dubbed Misericordia Vecchia. Both were demolished in 1819 when work on the Gran Guardia resumed, leaving the eastern edge unresolved.

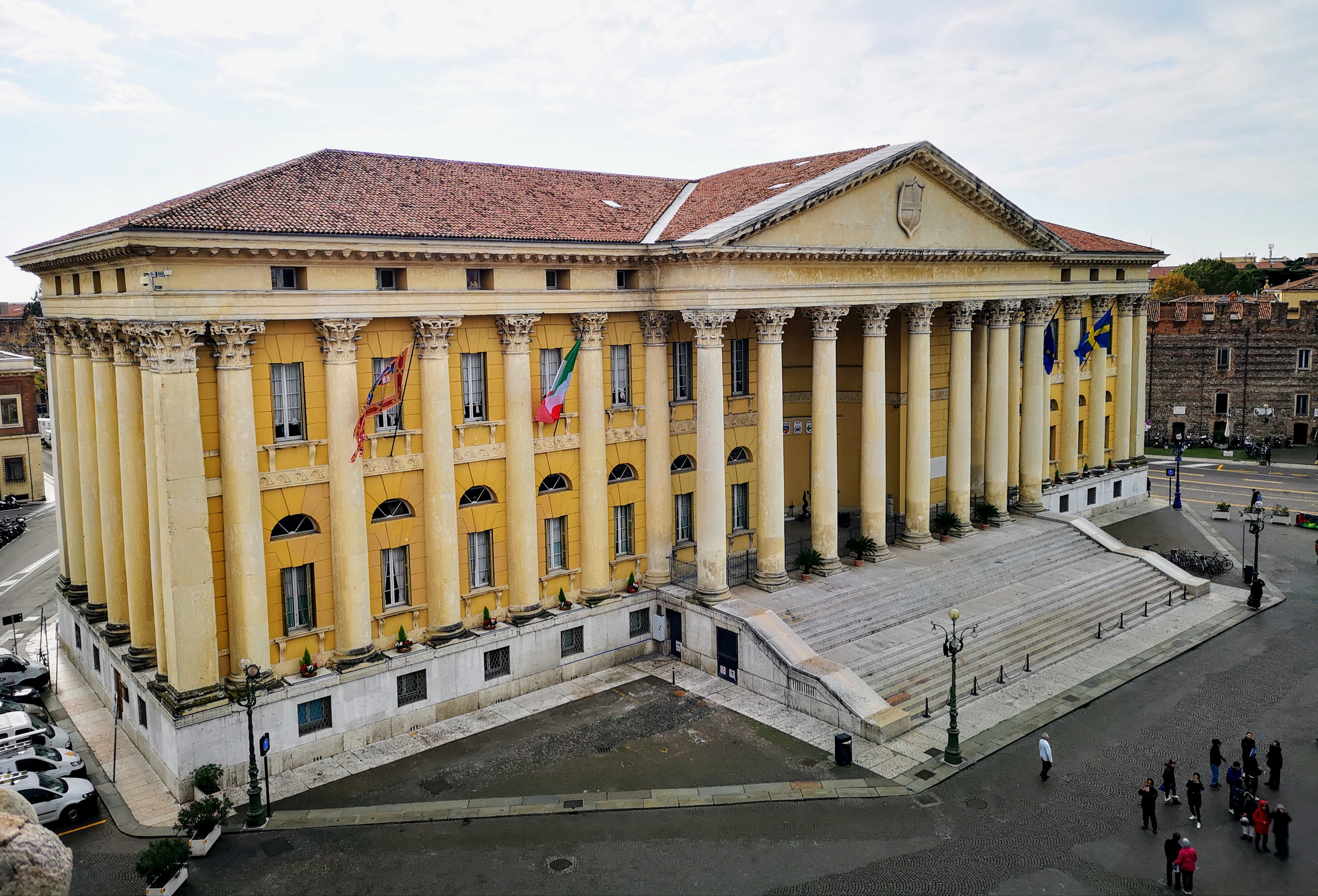
Palazzo Barbieri viewed from the Arena

In 1827, with the Bra's growing importance, a grand new building was commissioned, requiring the demolition of the Misericordia Vecchia, the church, and parts of Sant’Agnese facing the square. Giuseppe Barbieri's design was approved in 1831, though completion dates past 1843 are uncertain. Built for military use as the Gran Guardia Nuova, it housed the Imperial Royal City and Fortress Command in 1848. After years of disuse and renovations, it became the municipal offices in 1868, renamed Palazzo Barbieri after its architect.

Allied bombing on February 23, 1945, during World War II partially destroyed it. Reconstruction was approved in February 1947, with a new semicircular rear section designed by Raffaele Benatti and Guido Troiani, completed in 1950.

=== Statues and plaques ===
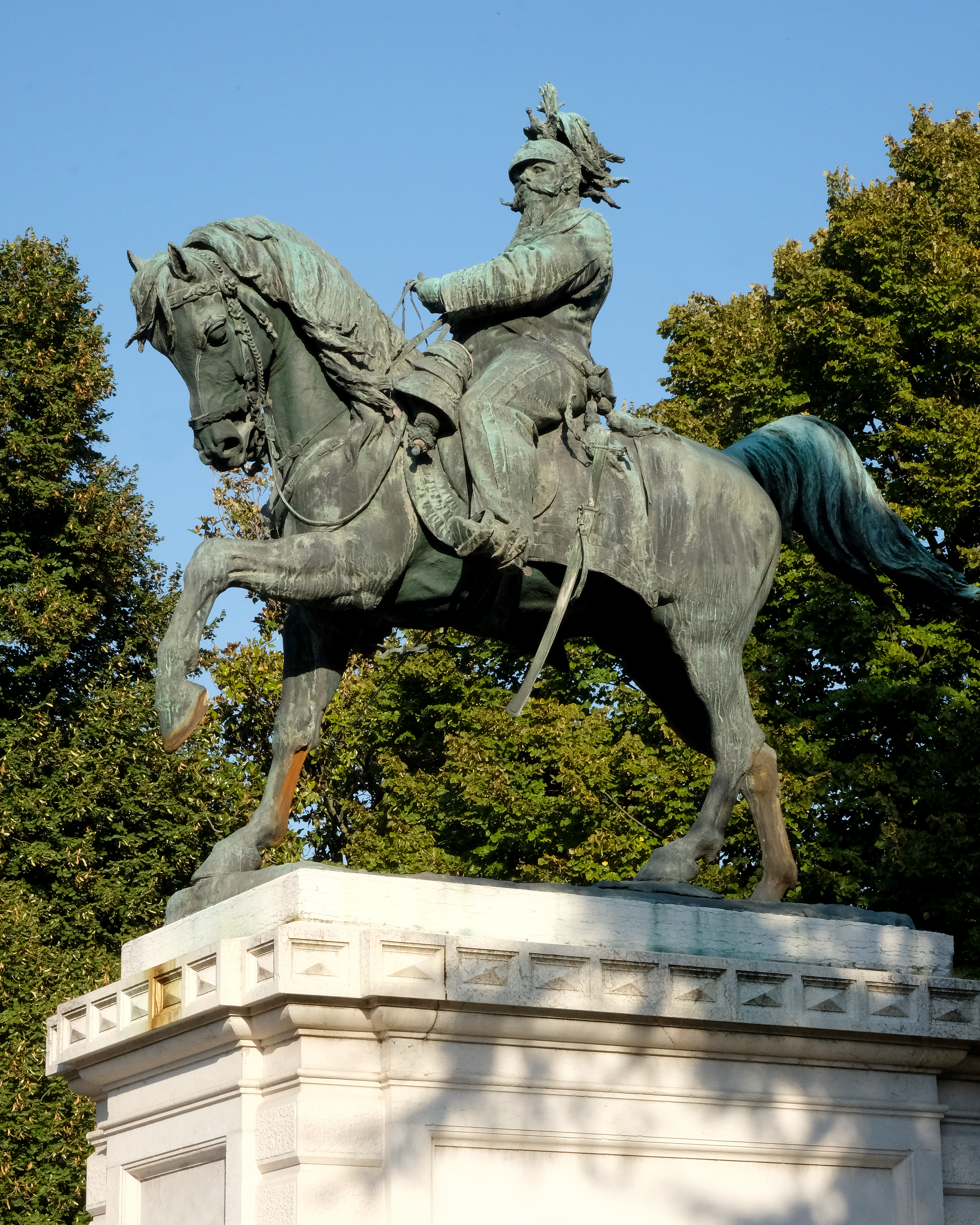
The statue of Victor Emmanuel II

Over time, the Bra's prominence has made it a site for commemorative plaques and statues. The grandest is the equestrian monument to King Victor Emmanuel II, crafted by Ambrogio Borghi and unveiled on January 9, 1883, though its pedestal required reinforcement months later to bear the bronze's weight.

Several plaques adorn the Liston palaces: one commemorates the massacre of October 6, 1866, noting “In this house, Carlotta Aschieri—25 and pregnant—fell butchered by Austrians, the last gasp of a dying tyranny”; another honors 18-year-old Luigi Lenotti, executed for desertion by Austrians; one marks Garibaldi’s “Rome or Death” oath to the crowd from Palazzo Gianfilippo; another remembers the Libyan war dead. Three plaques grace the City Hall: one for the 1866 plebiscite, one for Veronese war dead from 1848 to 1866, and one thanking the army for aid during the 1882 Adige flood. A monument to the 6th Alpini Regiment’s fallen stands along the wall beside the Gran Guardia.

== Access roads ==
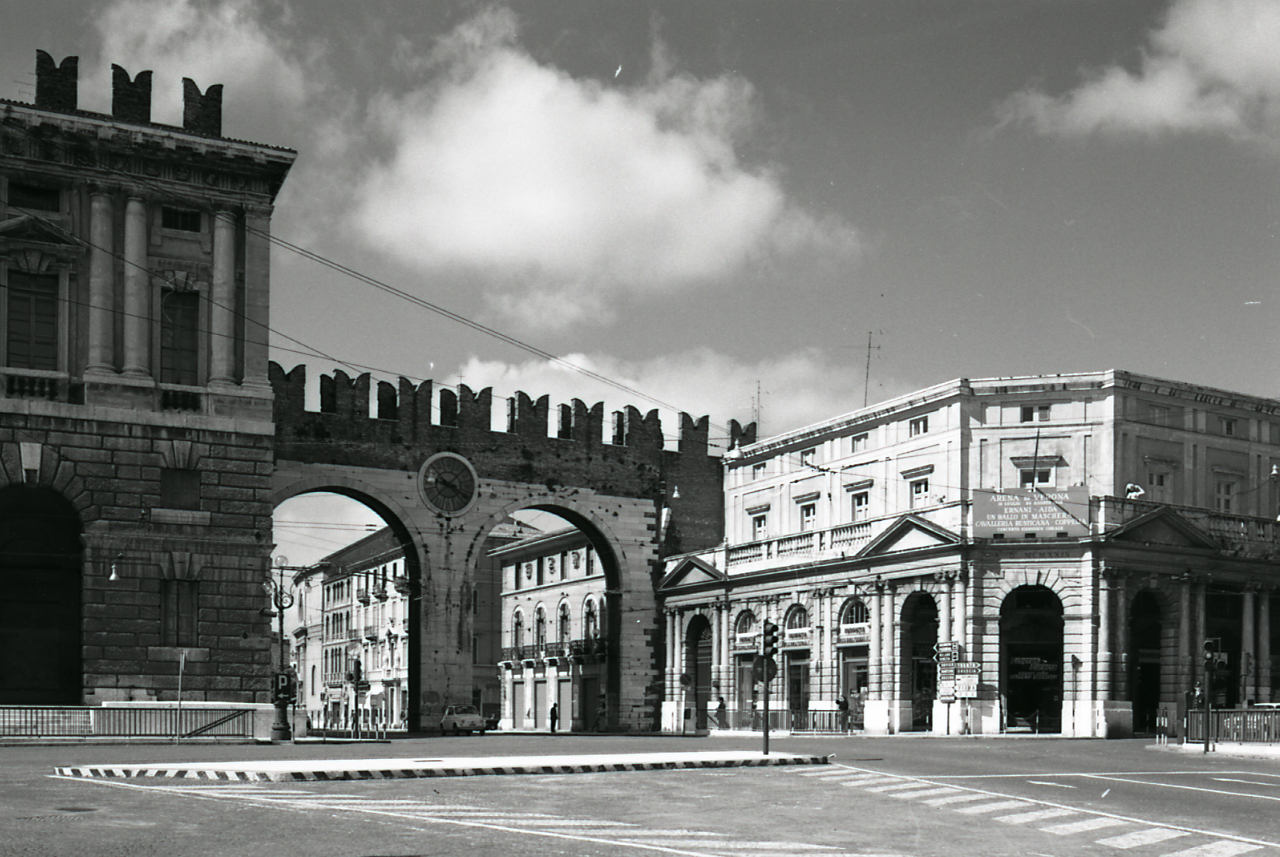
The Portoni della Bra in a 1972 photo by Paolo Monti; on the right, the Maffeian Lapidary Museum; on the left, the Gran Guardia

The square is accessible from all four cardinal directions via major roads: Corso Porta Nuova from the south, Via Mazzini from the north, Via Roma from the west, and Via Pallone from the east.

Until the 18th century, Corso Porta Nuova, stretching from Michele Sanmicheli’s Porta Nuova to the Portoni della Bra, was a winding lane amid uneven terrain. New buildings aligned along the Porta Nuova-to-Portoni axis emerged in the 1700s, and by the 19th century, it was leveled with wide sidewalks added. It became the main entry to the square and city, especially after the Verona Porta Nuova railway station was built.

Via Mazzini connects the Bra to the city's heart, reaching Piazza Erbe and Piazza dei Signori. Its first stretch follows a Roman decumanus, while the latter half was opened after Gian Galeazzo Visconti ordered demolitions. In the Middle Ages, dubbed Via Nuova, it was unpaved with shop awnings cluttering it; cleanup began in the early 1800s, with partial paving in 1818, completed only by the late 20th century.

Via Roma leads from the Bra to Castelvecchio, while Via Pallone runs to Ponte Aleardi and the Monumental Cemetery.

== See also ==
- Monuments of Verona
- History of Verona

== Bibliography ==
- Lenotti, Tullio (1954). La Bra [The Bra] (in Italian). Verona: Vita veronese.
- Coarelli, Filippo; Franzoni, Lanfranco (1972). Arena di Verona: venti secoli di storia [Verona Arena: Twenty Centuries of History] (in Italian). Verona: Ente autonomo Arena di Verona.
- Puppi, Lionello (1978). Ritratto di Verona: lineamenti di una storia urbanistica [Portrait of Verona: Outlines of an Urban History] (in Italian). Verona: Banca popolare di Verona.
- Brugnoli, Pierpaolo (1999). Le strade di Verona [The Streets of Verona] (in Italian). Rome: Newton Compton. ISBN 88-8289-025-2.
- Priante, Giovanni (2007). L'Arena e Verona: 140 anni di storia [The Arena and Verona: 140 Years of History] (in Italian). Verona: Athesis.
