= Accademia Filarmonica =

The Accademia Filarmonica may refer to:

- The Accademia Filarmonica di Bologna
- The Accademia Filarmonica di Verona
