= 1822 in music =

This article is about music-related events in 1822.

== Events ==
- March 16 – Marriage of Gioachino Rossini and Spanish soprano Isabella Colbran.
- Over the middle of the year Franz Schubert begins writing his Symphony No. 8, in B minor (D 759), but leaves it unfinished.
- Official date of the invention of the accordion by Christian Friedrich Ludwig Buschmann. (This has been thrown into doubt by the discovery of an accordion apparently manufactured in 1816.)
- The Royal Academy of Music is founded in London with William Crotch as first principal. It opens in March 1823 before the Royal charter is granted in June 1830.
- Johann Wenzel Kalliwoda becomes musical director to Prince Karl Egon II of Furstenburg.
- Harpist Franz Stockhausen marries soprano Margarethe Schmuck.
- Franz Liszt arrives in Vienna and commences piano lessons with Carl Czerny and theory lessons with Antonio Salieri. The latter writes a letter to Prince Esterhazy to advocate for Liszt's continued study in Vienna. On December 1, Liszt gives his first public performance in Vienna, sharing the billing with Caroline Unger. He plays Hummel's Piano Concerto No. 2.

== Popular music ==
- "Araby's Daughter" (song) w. Thomas Moore m. George Kiallmark. The words are derived from Moore's "Farewell to Araby's Daughter" published in 1817.

== Classical music ==
- Ludwig van Beethoven
  - Sonata op. 111 in C minor
  - Gratulations Menuett for Orchestra, WoO 3
  - The Consecration of the House
- Ferdinando Carulli – 3 Nocturnes concertants, Op. 143
- Mauro Giuliani – Serenade, Op. 19
- Johann Nepomuk Hummel – Birthday Cantata for Goethe
- Niels Peter Jensen – Flute Sonata, Op. 6
- Friedrich Kuhlau
  - Violin Sonata, Op. 33
  - Leichte Variationen über sechs Oestreichische Volkslieder, Op. 42
  - 3 Sonatinas, Op. 44
- Luigi Legnani – 36 Caprices, Op. 20
- Franz Liszt – Variation on a Waltz by Diabelli
- Ferdo Livadić – Nocturne in F-sharp minor
- Joseph Mayseder – String Quartet No.6, Op. 23
- Felix Mendelssohn
  - Concerto for Piano and Strings in A minor
  - Piano Quartet No. 1 in C minor
  - Sinfonia for Strings No. 7 in D minor
  - Sinfonia for Strings No. 8 in D Major
- Brizio Petrucci – Requiem Mass
- Anton Reicha – Wind Quintet, Op. 99 Nos. 2, 5
- Ferdinand Ries – Variations, Op. 105 Nos. 1 and 2
- Pierre Rode – 24 Caprices for Solo Violin, Op. 22
- Gioachino Rossini – La santa alleanza
- Franz Schubert
  - Symphony no. 8
  - Wanderer Fantasy
  - Der Wachtelschlag, D.742
  - Die Rose, D.745
  - Geist der Liebe, D.747
  - Am Geburtstage des Kaisers, D.748
  - Heliopolis, D.753
- Jan Václav Voříšek – Impromptu

== Opera ==
- Gaetano Donizetti – Zoraida di Granata
- Giacomo Meyerbeer – L'esule di Granata
- Franz Schubert
  - Die Verschworenen, D.787
  - Alfonso und Estrella

== Births ==
- January 8 – Carlo Alfredo Piatti, cellist (d. 1901)
- February 14 – Betty Boije, Finnish-Swedish contralto and composer (d. 1854)
- February 26 – Franz Strauss, horn player and composer, father of Richard Strauss (d. 1905)
- February 28 – Nicolas Maline, luthier (d. 1877)
- March 7 – Victor Massé, composer (d. 1884)
- April 3 – Elma Ström, Swedish opera singer (d. 1889)
- April 8 – Giuseppe Apolloni, opera composer (d. 1889)
- April 25 – James Pierpont, songwriter (d. 1893)
- May 27 – Joachim Raff, pianist, composer and music teacher (d. 1882)
- July 22 – Luigi Arditi, violinist, conductor and composer (d. 1903)
- August 15 – Wilhelm Rust, musicologist and composer (d. 1892)
- October 13 – Carl Martin Reinthaler, organist, conductor and composer (d. 1896)
- October 14 – Julie Berwald, singer.
- October 15 – Kornél Ábrányi, pianist and composer (d. 1903)
- December 3 – Korla Awgust Kocor, conductor and composer (d. 1904)
- December 10 – César Franck, organist and composer (d. 1890)
- December 16 – Charles Edward Horsley (d.1876)
- December 22 – Charles Lebouc, cellist (d. 1893)
- date unknown – Giulio Regondi, guitarist and composer (d. 1872)

== Deaths ==
- January – Americo Sbigoli, operatic tenor (burst blood vessel)
- February 2 – Jean-Baptiste Davaux, French violinist and composer, 79
- March 2 – Hermann Uber, composer, 40
- March 19 – Józef Wybicki, soldier-poet, lyricist of the Polish national anthem, 74
- March 22 – Johann Wilhelm Hässler, organist, pianist and composer, 74/5
- April 3 – Édouard Du Puy, violinist, singer and composer, 51/2
- June 25 – E. T. A. Hoffmann, composer and author, inspiration for Tales of Hoffmann, 46
- August 25 – William Herschel, British astronomer and composer, 83
- September 8 – Joseph Karl Ambrosch, operatic tenor and composer, 63
- October 16 – Eva Marie Veigel, dancer, 98
- November 18 – Anton Teyber, pianist and composer, 66
- December 28 – Albert Christoph Dies, composer and painter, 67
