= Liston (square) =

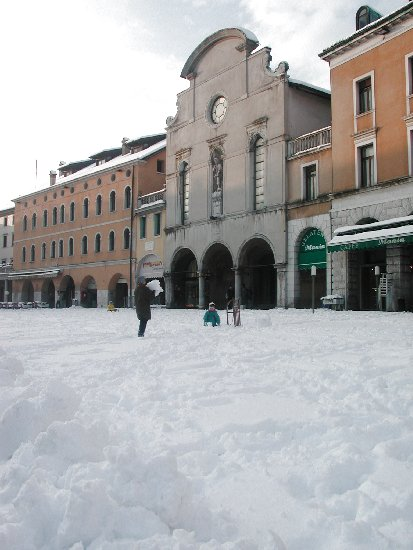
The liston of Belluno covered by snow

Liston is a Venetian word used in various cities of the Veneto region and former possessions of the former Republic of Venice. It is used to indicate a part of the city, usually a square or section of a square. The term liston refers to the long marble slabs used for paving the streets. The term far el liston means "to walk around the square".

Several cities in the Veneto have a liston. In Venice, it is the name of the walk from St. Mark's Square past the columns of Marco and Todaro. In Verona it is the west side of Piazza Bra. In Padua it is part of the Prato della Valle. In Belluno the liston is in Martyrs' Square (also known as the "Campedel"). In Rovigo it is the central part of the Piazza Vittorio Emanuele II. In Trieste, which has strong ties with Venetian culture, it is called the Corso Italia. In the Greek island of Corfu the locals still use the word to indicate the main promenade of Corfu city.

== Venice ==
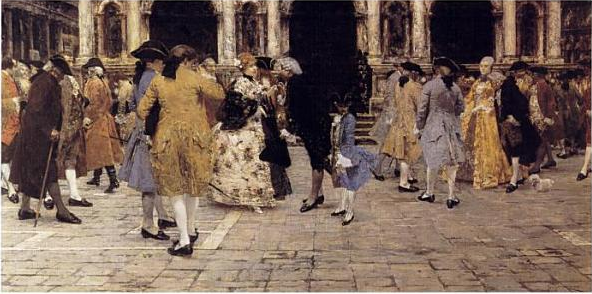
El Liston (1884) by Giacomo Favretto (1849–1887)

In Venice the Campo Santo Stefano was a grass area for many centuries, apart from the stone liston. This was the place where Venetians would stroll and meet, and the term for "take a walk" in the Venetian dialect is still andare al liston. Later the term liston was used for the Piazza San Marco, described as "the general rendezvous of the promenaders and ... the fashionable lounge of Venice".

Writing of 18th century Venice, Giovanni Rossi (1776–1852) describes the liston in the fashionable area near the San Stefano Church. During the carnival young nobles strutted there like peacocks wearing tabàro capes and the "most civilized mask", the baùta. Although the common people could walk there, according to Rossi, "their education was such that commoners left the nobles their space in liberty." Giacomo Favretto depicted El Liston in 1884, showing figures in elegant costumes walking and meeting in the heart of Venice.

== Belluno ==
Martyrs' Square (Italian: Piazza dei Martiri, also known as Campedel) in Belluno is called the "living room" of the city. The square is just outside the walls of the old city. Some historians claim that shape of the north side of the square was defined by the radius of guns defending the former walls of the city, to the south, which no longer exist. The axis of the square is defined by the liston, a long promenade. According to tradition, the quaint paved liston was made when the city was under the rule of the Venetian Republic. As of 2011, plans to redevelop the square were being considered, retaining the historic liston but removing the road that runs along the southern margin.

== Padua ==
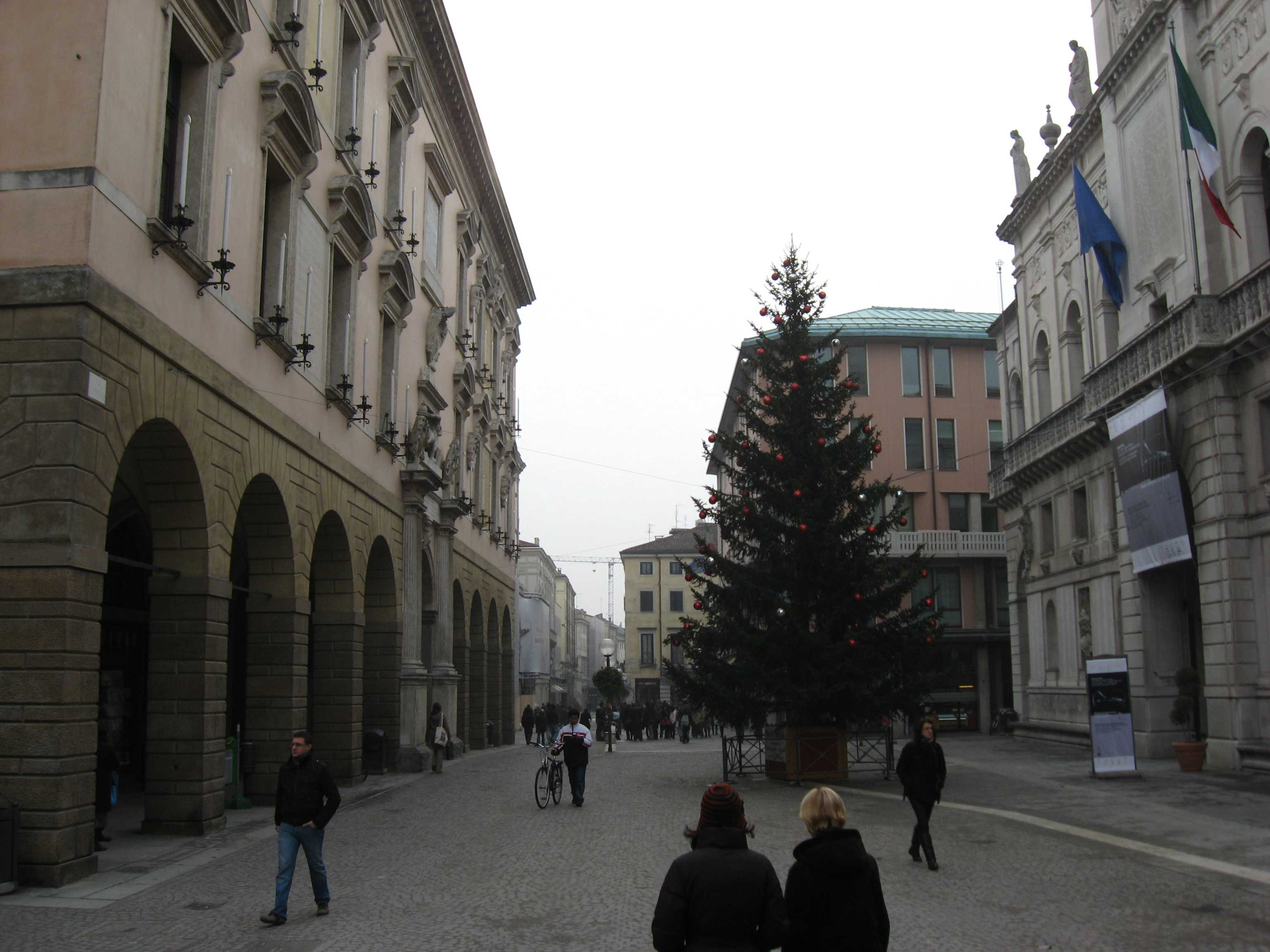
Padua

In Padua, historically, the liston was the stretch of Prato della Valle on the west side, opposite the Loggia Amulea, paved with trachyte in the first half of the 19th century by the architect Giuseppe Jappelli. Typically on Saturdays and on other occasions the walk was used for lively outdoor markets.

In recent years the term Liston has come to be extended to the central Via Umberto I, Via Roma, Via Cavour and Via VIII Febbraio, after the pedestrianization of the area between the mid-1980s and the year 2000. This has entered the common language of newspapers and local TV stations, even if technically incorrect. However the term applies well to these roads, since the creation of the pedestrian zone has effectively created a single long walk from Prato della Valle to Piazza Garibaldi.

== Rovigo ==
In Rovigo there is a liston in both the squares of the historic center, the Piazza Vittorio Emanuele II and the Piazza Garibaldi. The second runs along the old boundaries of the Church of Santa Giustina, demolished in 1809.

== Verona ==
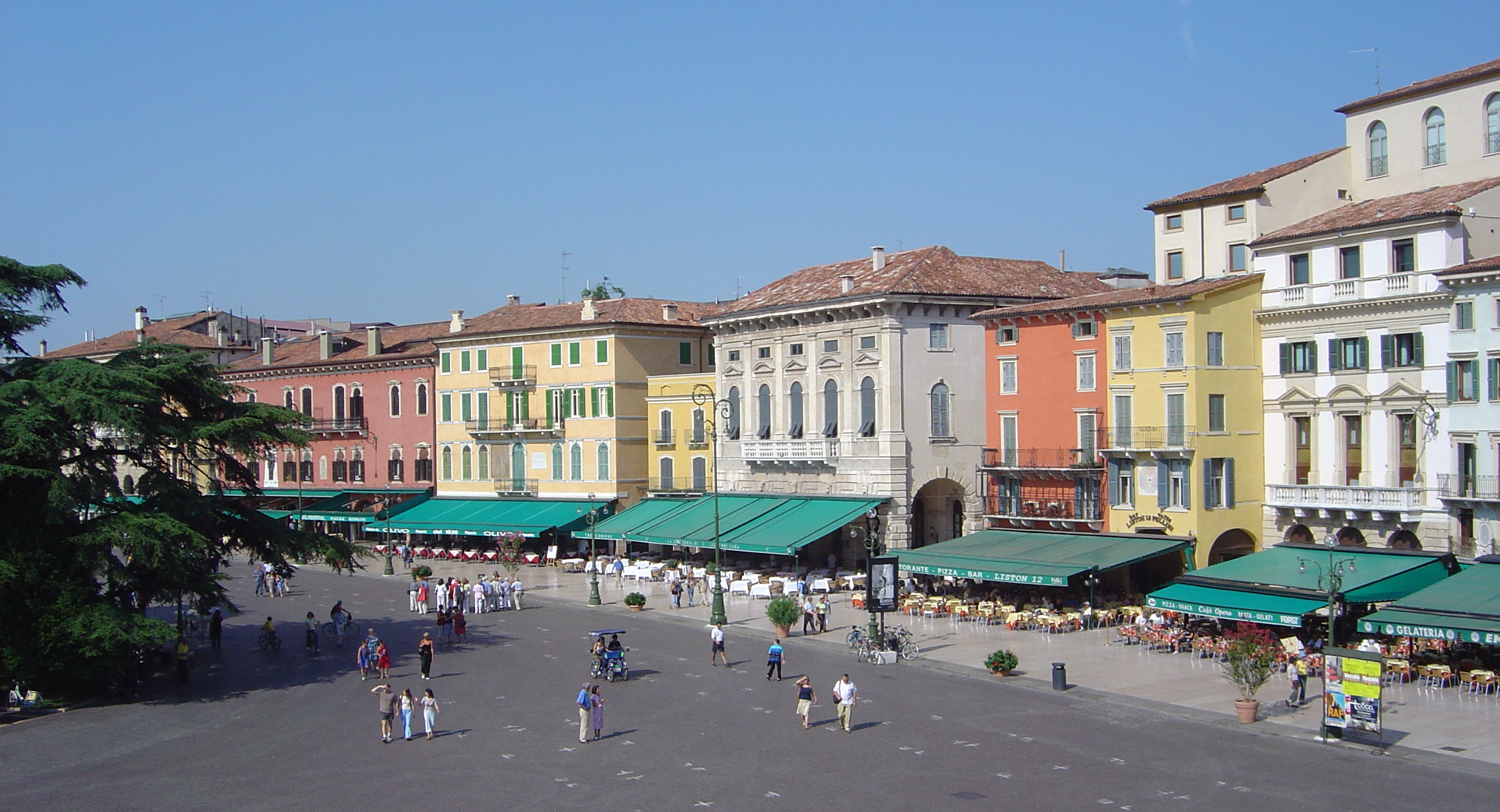
Verona

In Verona the liston is the wide sidewalk that borders the Piazza Bra on the west side, curving around the Arena. The piazza is a popular place for both tourists and local people to promenade. The liston is now used for outdoor seating by the many cafés surrounding the piazza.

== Ferrara ==
Ferrara has a liston next to the Cathedral in the ancient "Piazza delle Erbe", now called the "Piazza Trento & Trieste". Although Ferrara is part of the Emilia region, it has many Venetian aspects and is considered a bridge between the Emilian and Venetian culture.

== Corfu ==
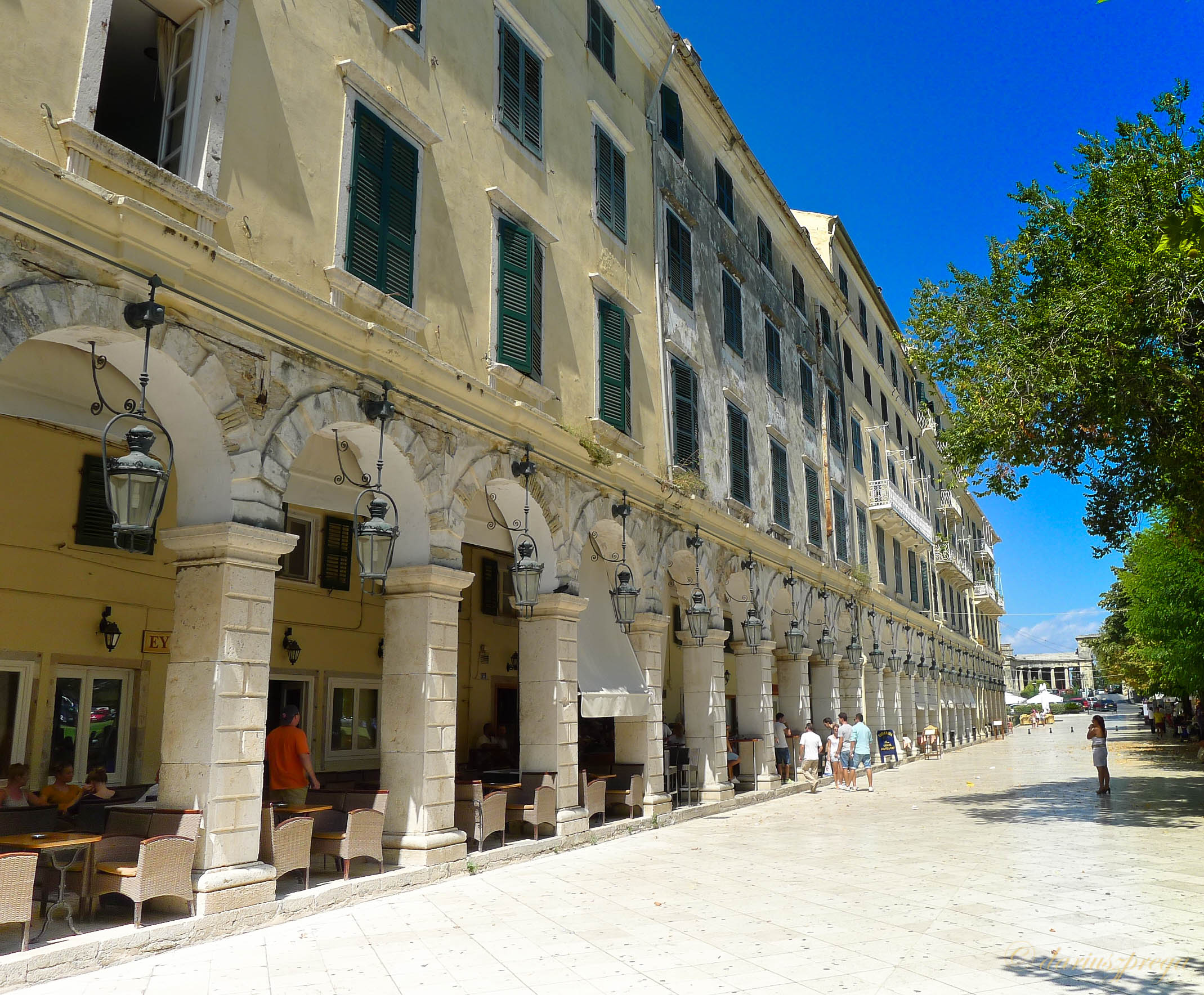
The Liston in Corfu

The Liston in Corfu, with arcaded terraces and fashionable cafes, was built in 1807 by the French imperial commissioner Mathieu de Lesseps. It is an excellent example of architecture from the Napoleonic period, when Corfu was part of the First French Empire. The design was inspired by the Rue de Rivoli, Paris.

Brewster Chamberlin celebrated it in his 2005 poem "Along the Liston, Corfu", describing the Liston as a crowded, relaxed place to sit and snack and watch the promenaders.

The Liston runs along one side of the Spianada, part town square and part park. At one time it was a firing range for Venetian troops.

Now it holds a cricket pitch, a British innovation that is regularly used by local teams.
