= Pedro Valenzuela =

Italian composer (fl. 1569–1579)

Pedro Valenzuela (fl. 1569-1579) was an Italian composer of the Renaissance period. He was of Spanish descent, and became a known foreign musician, performing as both a singer and composer.

== Life ==
It is known that Pedro Valenzuela was active in Verona in 1569. While there, he gave an impressive performance at a musical event, leading the Accademia Filarmonica to offer him a paid position as maestro. Valenzuela was ranked just below the top post and gave private musical instruction to the academies members. Due to issues with his salary, Valenzuela left his post just a couple months later in December of 1569. In 1577, Valenzuela was appointed as a singer in the choir at the Basilica di San Marco in Venice. He was recognized for his musical talent as both a singer and composer, earning a significant salary representative of his skill. Valenzuela remained at this post until 1579 when he left Venice, then joining the prestigious choir of SS Annunziata in Naples as an alto. In some records, his name appears as "Valenzola da Napoli," accounting for this relocation.

== Music and influence ==
Valenzuela embraced the Italian madrigal style, which was common among Catalan composers. Similarly, many Spanish composers described their work as madrigals and used Italian text. Valenzuela was one of these composers, representing the influence of Italian culture in Spain. He likely trained musically in the Venetian region, including Verona. Most of his works align with this Italian madrigal style, although his setting of the canzone stands out for its reflection of earlier musical styles. In his other madrigals, Valenzuela shows influence from the Venetian musical scene. This presented a gradual shift to a bold, more expressive musical style. While his polychoral works are both rich and elaborate, Valenzuela's piece La verginella stands out for its artistic refinement, placing his work next to composers such as Gabrieli and Byrd.

Valenzuela's 1578 collection of madrigals consists of a variety of pieces written in the Italian language. This includes a cycle based on Petrarch's canzone In quella parte dove Amor mi sprona, and his sonnets Pace non trovo and Padre del ciel. This collection also includes settings of work by both Ariosto and Girolamo Parabosco. All other authors of the texts remain unattributed.

== List of works ==
- Cantionum sacrarum
- La veriginella
- Mentre vienti o mio sole
- Voi volete ch'io muoia
