= Palazzo Barbieri =

Palace in Verona, Italy

Coordinates: 45°26′17″N 10°59′38″E

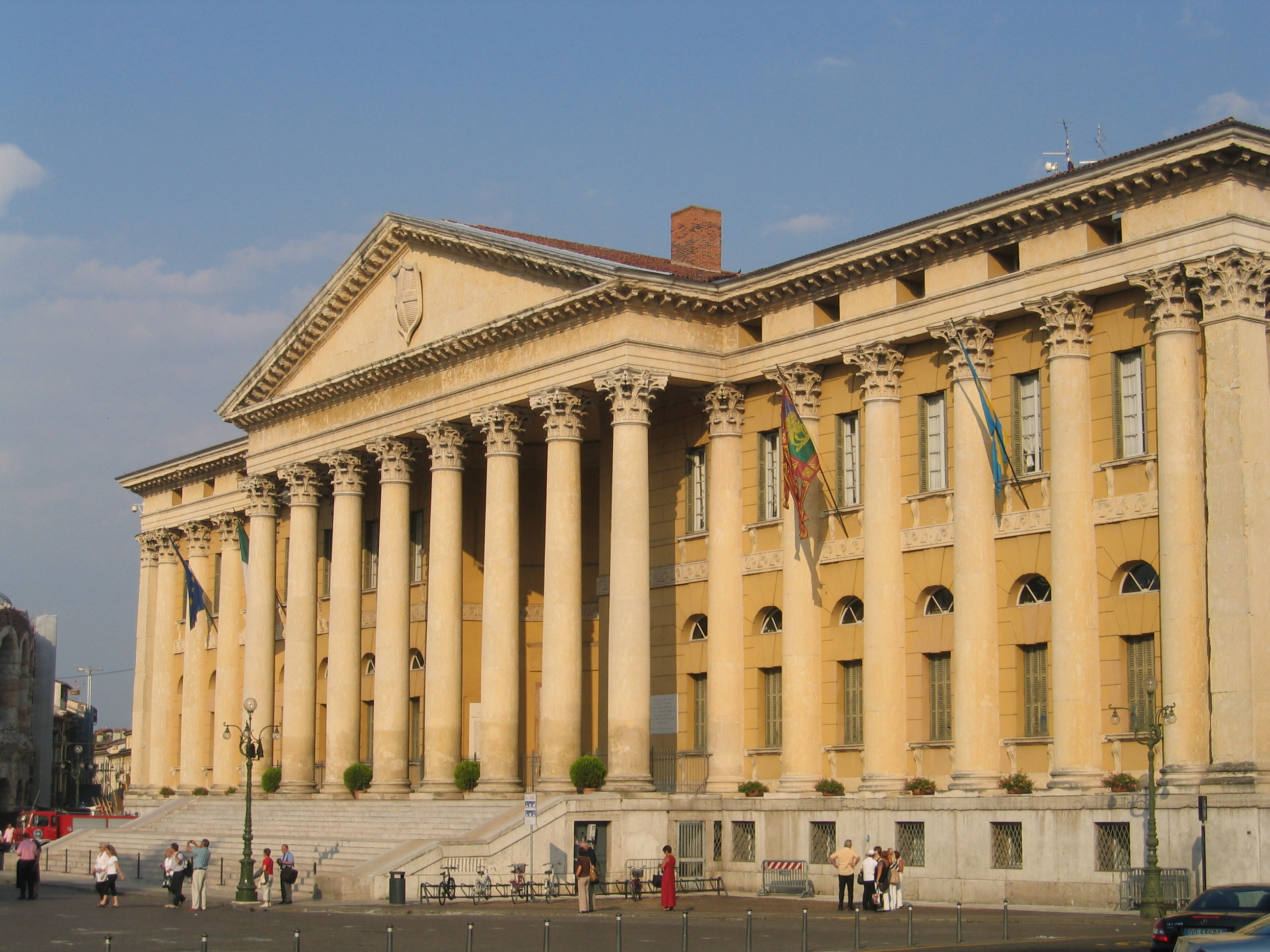
Palazzo Barbieri

Palazzo Barbieri (/pəˈlætsoʊ ˌbɑːrbiˈɛəri/ pə-LAT-soh BAR-bee-AIR-ee, Italian: [paˈlattso barˈbjɛːri]) is a Neoclassical-style palace located in Piazza Bra in Central Verona; it now serves as the town hall.

The palace was originally named Palazzo della Gran Guardia Nuova, and housed staff associated with the Austrian Army forces. It was designed by Giuseppe Barbieri and was later named in his honor. Construction began in 1836 and was completed by 1848.

The interiors contain a large canvas (1595) by Felice Brusasorzi depicting the victory of the Veronese over Benacensi in the year 829. Others who worked in the studio or contributed were Alessandro Turchi, Pasquale Ottino, and Sante Creara.

A 14th-century fresco depicting a Crucifixion and the Madonna from a private house was implanted into the wall near the entrance. One room has tapestries from the 16th century. One designed by Paolo Farinati depicts the 1164 Victory of the Veronese against Frederick Barbarossa. Tha palace also contains various paintings by Carlo Ferrari and Eugenio Gignous.

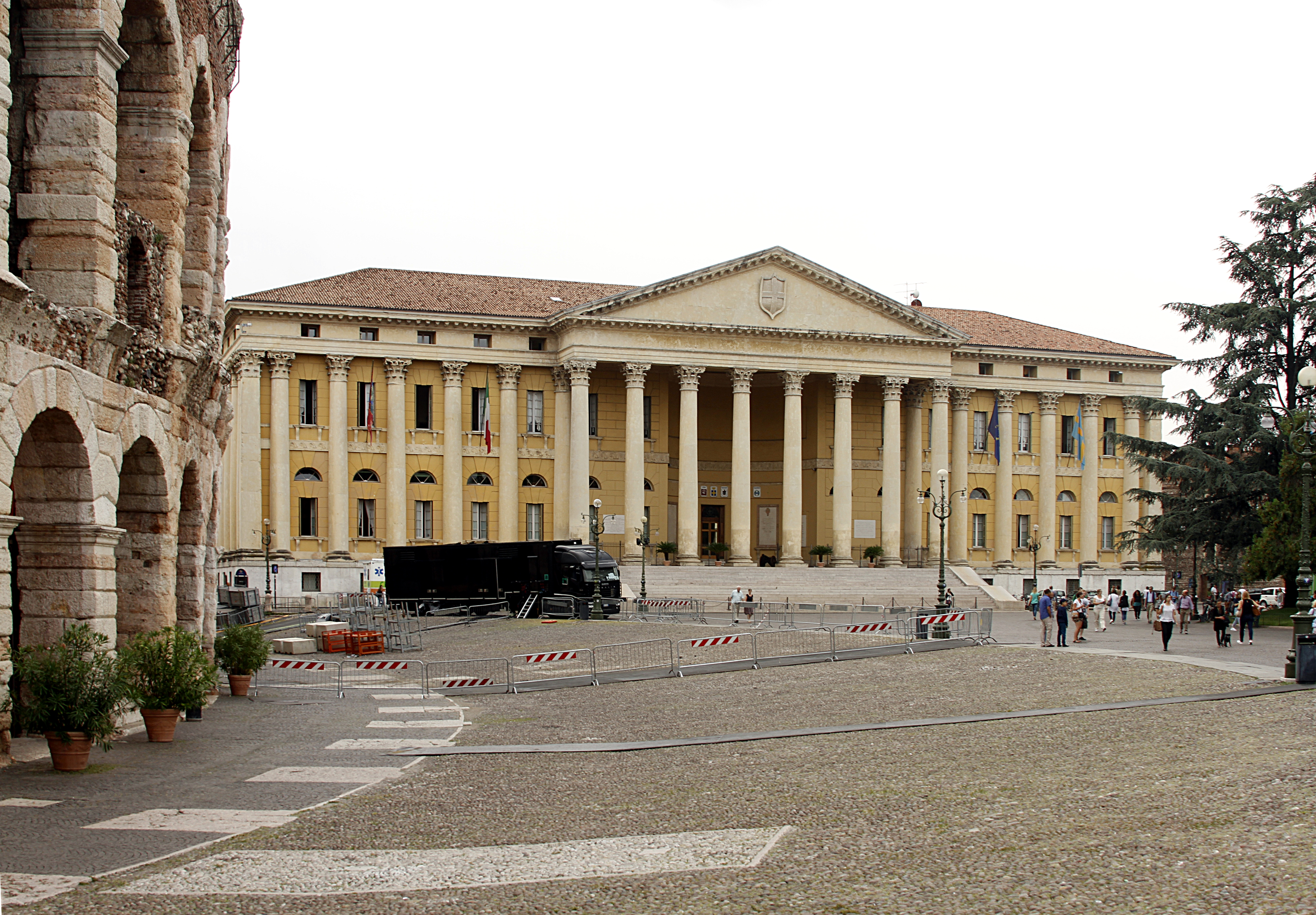
Neoclassical façade

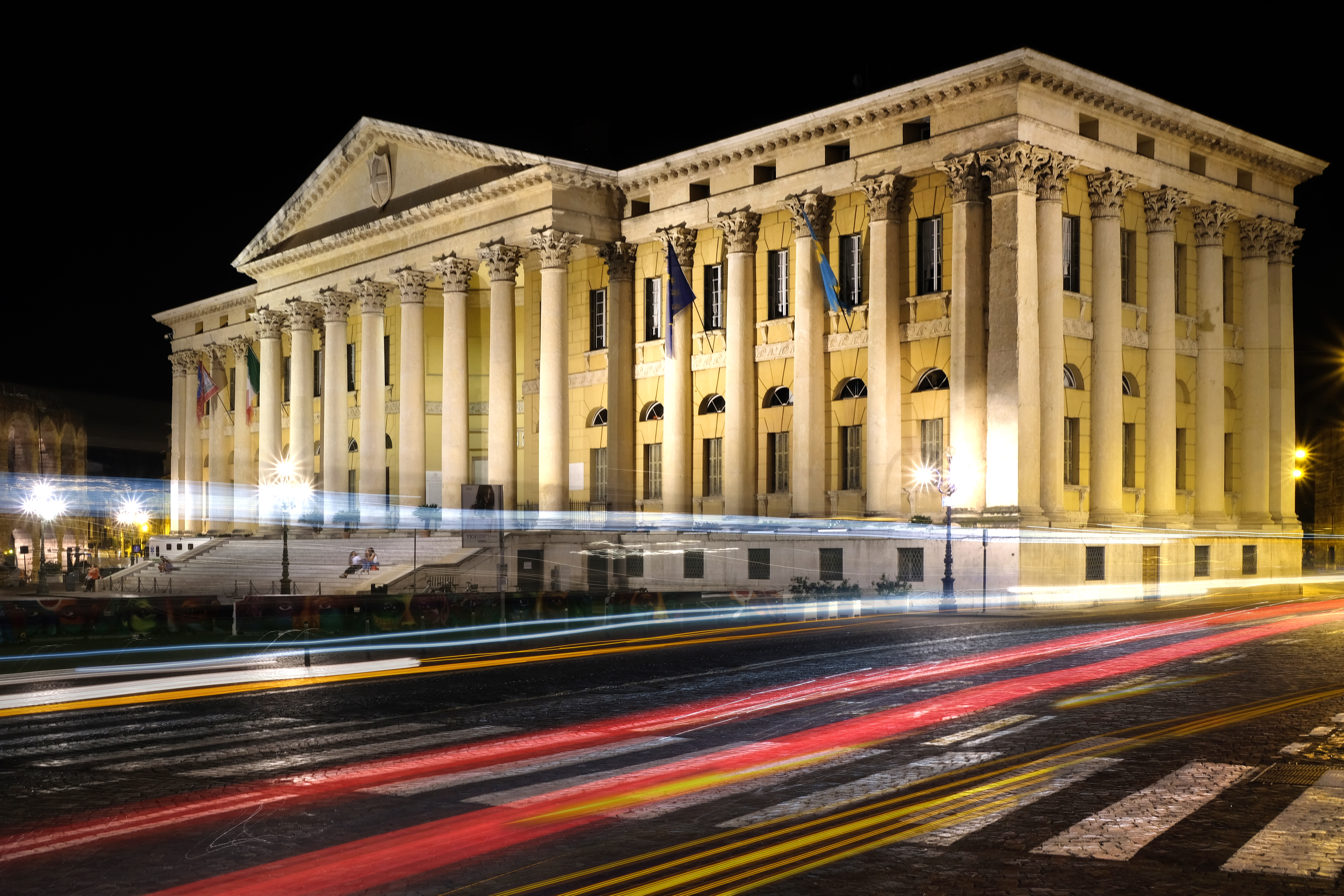
Night view

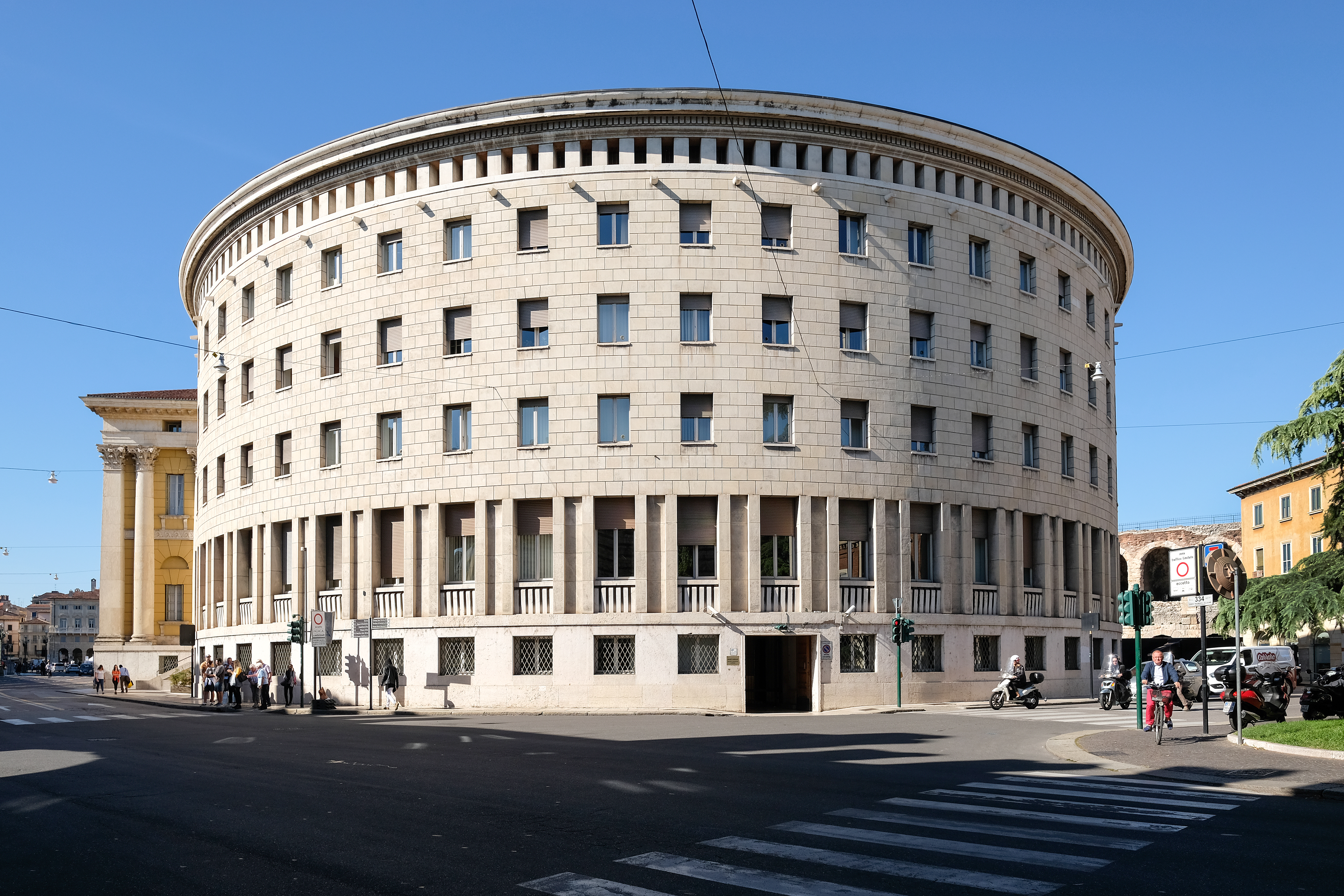
The modern expansion in the back

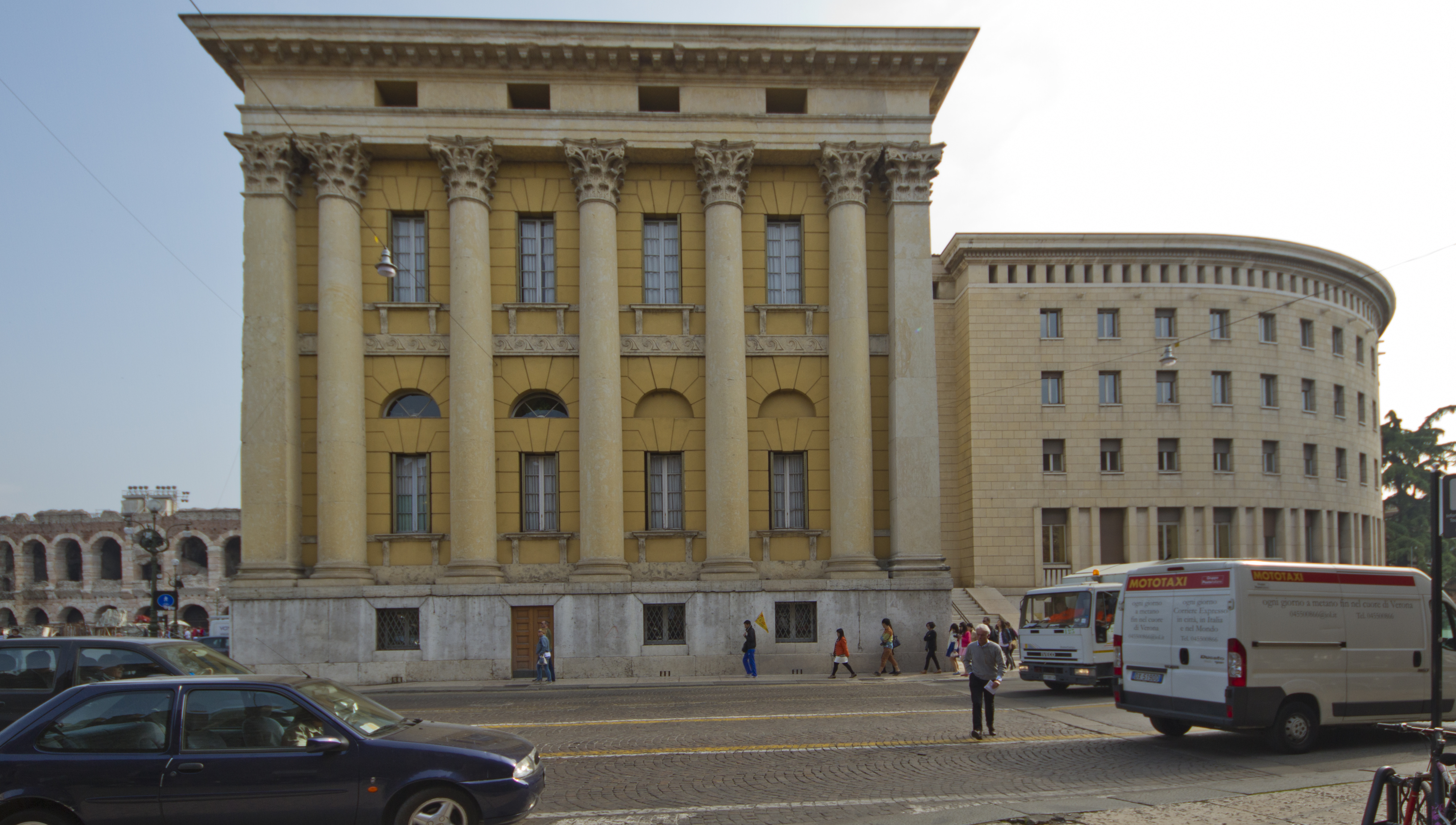
Side view, with the modern expansion
