= Lambert Courtois =

French composer, trombonist, and singer

Lambert Courtois (French pronunciation: [lɑ̃bɛʁ kuʁtwa]; also Courtoys, Curtois) (c.1520 – after 1583) was a French composer, trombonist, and singer of the late Renaissance, active in Italy and Ragusa.

Details of his early life are sparse. Originally from France, he came to Italy most likely during the 1540s, as several music prints there refer to someone of his name. By 1550 he was in Rome, where he performed at the church of San Marcello during Easter Week. He briefly directed the Accademia Filarmonica di Verona after their previous maestro di musica, Vincenzo Ruffo, was discharged for being negligent in his duties. Courtois only served for several months in early 1553. In May he went to Ragusa, modern-day Dubrovnik, as a trombonist in the court wind band. He remained there until 1570. Three further posts are known: a three-year stint in Udine lasting until 1573, and similar posts in Treviso (1578–79) and Vicenza (1582-83). Nothing further is known of his life after his employment in Vicenza.

Of Courtois's works, one book of madrigals for five voices (1580) and a handful of works printed in other anthologies survive. Two of the separate works are motets, written in the early 1540s, and attributed to "Lamberto", who was most likely the composer. The book of madrigals is dedicated to three aristocrats of Ragusa, who were likely students of the composer during his time in that city.

Courtois left family behind in Ragusa, including a son and grandson who were also musicians.
