= Teatro Filarmonico =

Opera house in Verona, Italy

Coordinates: 45°26′17″N 10°59′24″E

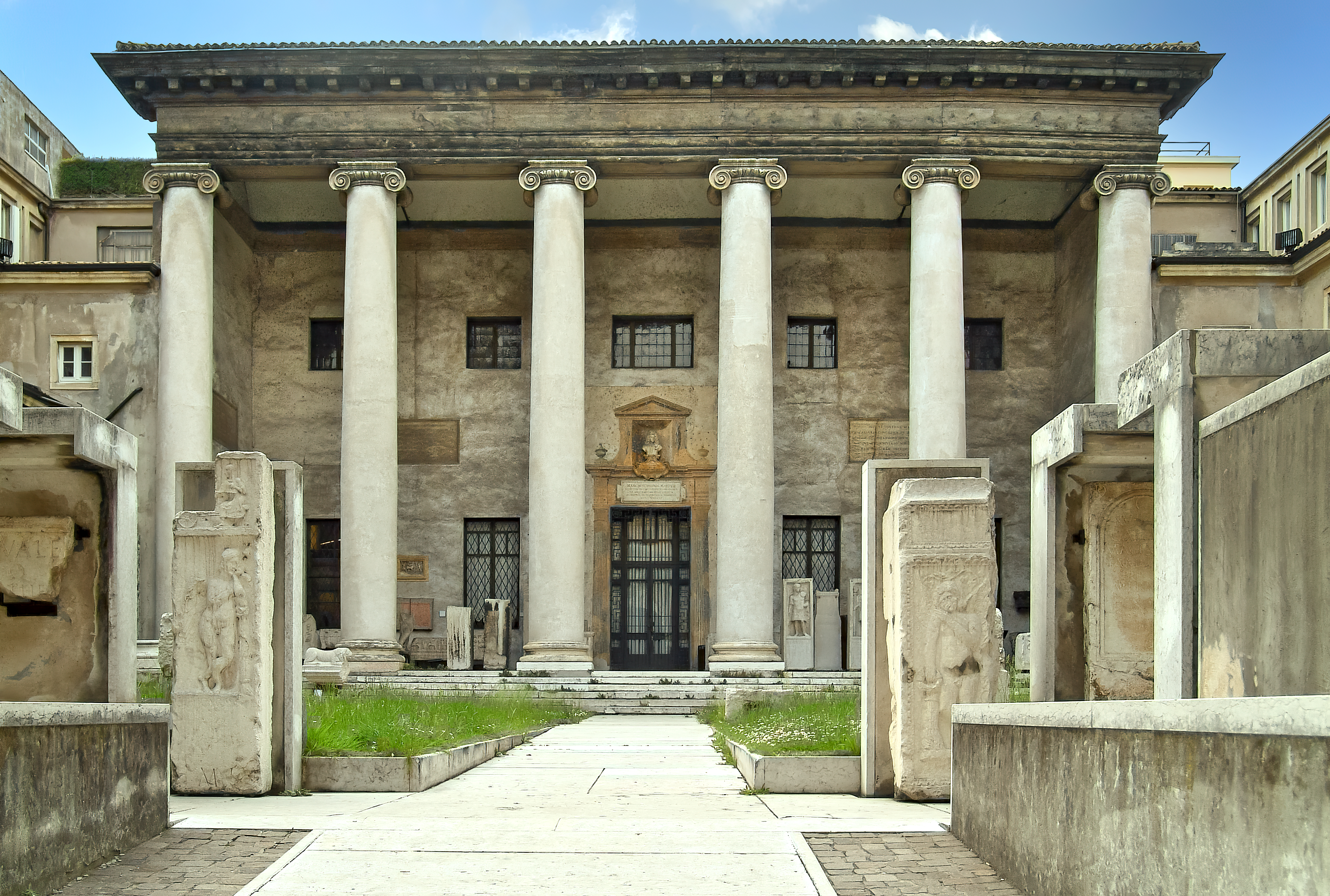
Exterior of the Teatro Filarmonico and the Museo lapidario maffeiano

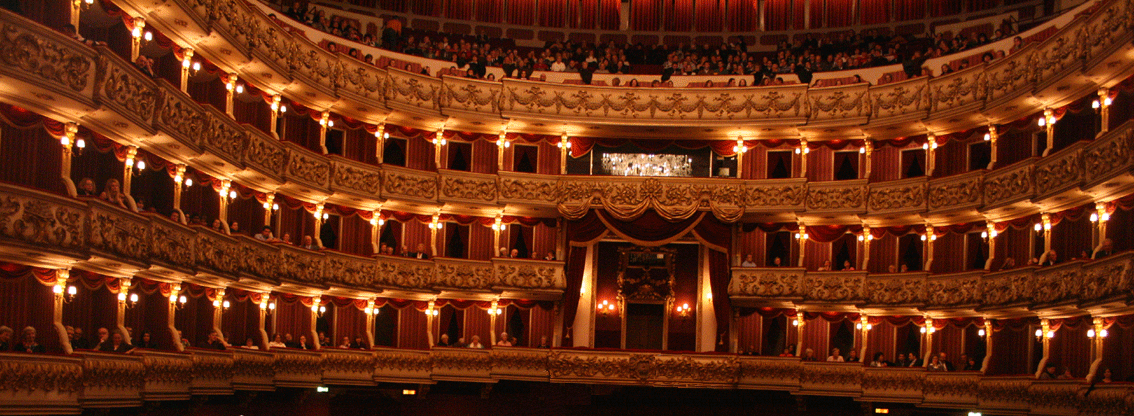
Interior design

The Teatro Filarmonico is the main opera theater in Verona, Italy, and is one of the leading opera houses in Europe. The Teatro Filarmonico is property of the Accademia Filarmonica di Verona. Having been built in 1716, and later rebuilt after a fire of January 21, 1749, and again after the allied bombing of February 23, 1945.

== History ==
Bereft of a large opera house, the Accademia Filarmonica di Verona decided in the early 18th century to build a theatre for the city. Work began in 1716 and lasted 13 years. The theater was inaugurated on the evening of January 6, 1732, with the pastoral drama La fida ninfa by Antonio Vivaldi, a libretto by Scipio Maffei. The opera season became famous, and the performances led society events. But on January 21, 1749, an accidental fire consumed the building. The theater was rebuilt and rededicated in 1754 with the opera Lucio Vero by Neapolitan composer Davide Perez. The opera had a limited success. During the Napoleonic French invasions, a long series of celebrations were held in the theater. In 1822 during the ,Congress of Verona the La santa alleanza (The Holy Alliance) by Gioachino Rossini was performed. The theater hosted international singers, and among its repertoire appear the most famous works of Italian and foreign melodrama.

On the night of February 23, 1945, the theater was razed by the Anglo-American bombing. The Philharmonic Academy announced that it would try to rebuild the theatre exactly as it had been before. The work lasted decades, and the theatre was inaugurated again in 1975, with the opera Falstaff by Antonio Salieri.

The theatre still hosts opera, ballets and concerts seasons. The operatic repertoire is one of the most famous for Italian operas and international (La sonnambula, The Barber of Seville, Tosca ...) and the works of non-repertoire (A day of the kingdom, Manon Lescaut of Auber, Loreley of Catalani ...). It was used during the 2026 Winter Olympics closing ceremony and the 2026 Winter Paralympics opening ceremony.

== See also ==
- Accademia Filarmonica di Verona
