= La santa alleanza =

1822 cantata composed by Gioachino Rossini

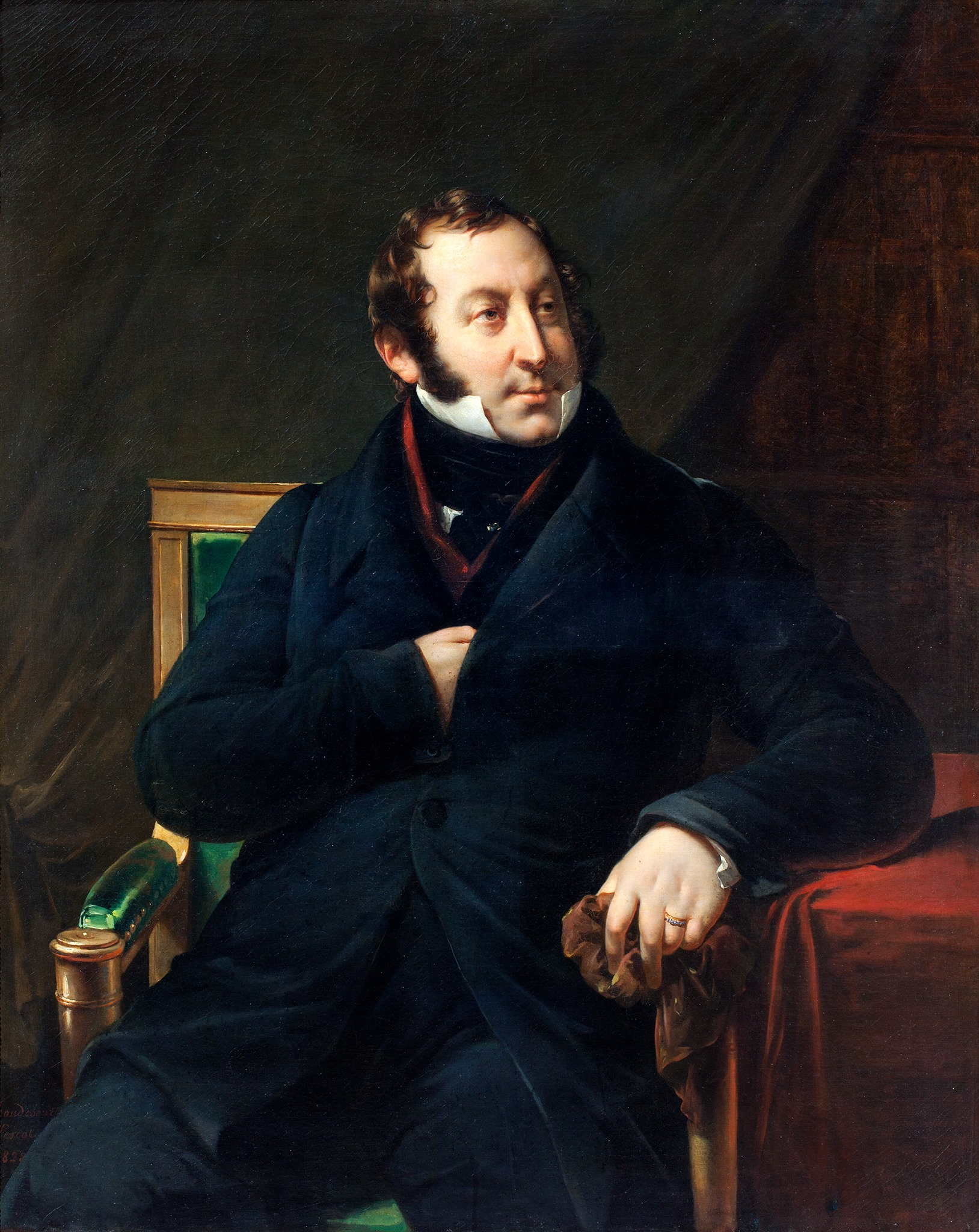
Gioachino Rossini, painted in Paris in 1828 by Hortense Haudebourt-Lescot

La santa alleanza (English: The Holy Alliance) is an 1822 cantata composed by the Italian Gioachino Rossini. It was produced by him for the Congress of Verona that year. Held in the Austrian-ruled city of Verona, it was the largest gathering of international figures since the Congress of Vienna seven years earlier. While Ludwig van Beethoven had been chosen to compose music to be performed at Vienna, in 1822 Klemens Von Metternich turned to the Italian Rossini.

The cantata was a celebration of the Holy Alliance that involved several Continental European powers, most notably Austria, Prussia and Russia. It premiered on 24 November 1822 in the city's Roman-era Verona Arena. It was one of four commissions Rossini received for the two month Congress. Amongst the works performed was a resetting of music from the 1810 opera La donna del lago with fresh lyrics.

A second cantata Il vero omaggio appeared at the city's Teatro Filarmonico on 3 December.

== Bibliography ==
- Jarrett, Mark. The Congress of Vienna and Its Legacy: War and Great Power Diplomacy After Napoleon. I.B. Tauris, 2013.
- Osborne, Richard. Rossini: His Life and Works. Oxford University Press, 2007.
- Roberts, Warren. Rossini and Choral compositions by Gioachino RossiniPost-Napoleonic Europe. University of Rochester, 2015.
