= Accademia Filarmonica di Verona =

Music academy

The Accademia Filarmonica di Verona is an academy dedicated to the performance and study of music, founded in 1543 in Verona, Italy. At its founding it consisted of a group of young noblemen with humanistic and literary inclinations, who were also musical amateurs, coming together to perform and study music. While it was not the first academy in Renaissance Italy – many academies were formed during the Renaissance to discuss intellectual, cultural, and humanistic issues – it was the earliest specifically musical academy of the Renaissance.

== History ==
The academy was founded on 1 May 1543 by the merging of two previous groups, the Incatenata and a previous Filarmonica. In its earliest incarnation, it was a small group of artists and musicians who assembled to perform and discuss music, largely for their own pleasure, with their meetings including abundant food and wine. The founders of the group were young members of Verona's aristocratic families. The six "regents" of the club took turns leading it, with their terms limited to two months. Before long they recognized the need to hire a professional teacher and composer as their maestro di musica, and in 1547 they contracted Jan Nasco, a Franco-Flemish composer from the Low Countries, to instruct them.

Nasco's duties were strict. The group met daily, and each evening he was to instruct the members in singing, if they wished; even if they did not want instruction, he was required to be present at their meetings. He was to compose music for any poem given to him by a member of the academy, and his compositions became the property of the academy. They gave him an annual salary of 30 ducats and lodging in their palazzo. During the hours prior to nones (three o'clock) he had free time, but if a majority of the members wanted his services he was required to be available. Nasco left his post after about four years, when the members attempted to cut his salary. However, he retained friendly relations with them, sending them numerous letters from Treviso, where he obtained another job. The academy next hired Vincenzo Ruffo to fill the post, but found him negligent in his duties and kept him for only nine months. Next to fill the post was the Frenchman Lambert Courtois. Some of the other notable musicians who served as maestro di musica for the academy in the 16th century included Alessandro Romano, Ippolito Chamaterò, Pedro Valenzuela, and Paolo Bellasio.

The academy flourished with little competition for the first twenty years of its existence, having regular meetings, giving public performances, and having an annual celebratory mass at a local church – always freshly composed – on the anniversary of their founding (1 May). While they were initially a private club, rarely admitting outside visitors, they increased the number of public performances over the years, expanding their reputation. Their influence can be seen in the extraordinary number of books of music dedicated to them: of all the books of madrigals dedicated to academies in Italy in the 16th century – out of over two hundred academies – fully half were dedicated to the Veronese Accademia Filarmonica. By the late 1560s the influence of the academy was beginning to wane, with competition from other academies and groups, in particular those gathered around the most influential Veronese music patron of the time, Count Mario Bevilacqua. Other Veronese academies in the 16th century – not all named Accademia, as some were named ridotto (retreat) – included the Accademia dei Moderati, the Accademia dei Novelli, and the ridotto Ridolfi, in addition to the ridotto of Bevilacqua. Yet another, the Accademia alla Vittoria merged with the Accademia Filarmonica in 1564, also for a period the Accademia Filarmonica was based at the Counts Giusti in Verona.

The academy continued, with a changing character, through the next centuries. In 1732, it built the famous Teatro Filarmonico, long considered to be one of the most beautiful theatres in Italy. The 14-year-old Mozart visited in December 1770 during his first trip to Italy with his father (it was during this visit that Saverio della Rosa painted the famous portrait of him). The Teatro Filarmonico was destroyed on 23 February 1945, during a bombing raid late in the Second World War, and was rebuilt during the 1960s.

== Present-day ==
In the present day, the academy both provides a venue for concerts and organizes performances. Part of its mission is presenting Renaissance and Baroque music. In addition to hosting live performances, the Accademia maintains a museum and library, with sections both on 16th- and 19th-century music. Many of the original musical instruments used during the early years of the academy are housed in the museum.
