= List of municipalities of the Province of Salerno =

List of 158 municipalities of the Province of Salerno

The following is a list of the 158 municipalities (comuni) of the Province of Salerno in the region of Campania in Italy.

== List ==
Municipality	Population (2026)	Area (km²)	Density
Acerno	2,418	72.50	33.4
Agropoli	21,418	32.77	653.6
Albanella	6,339	40.23	157.6
Alfano	891	4.82	184.9
Altavilla Silentina	7,058	52.48	134.5
Amalfi	4,572	5.70	802.1
Angri	34,353	13.77	2,494.8
Aquara	1,237	32.73	37.8
Ascea	5,914	37.45	157.9
Atena Lucana	2,400	26.01	92.3
Atrani	751	0.12	6,258.3
Auletta	2,106	35.68	59.0
Baronissi	16,788	17.93	936.3
Battipaglia	49,504	56.85	870.8
Bellizzi	13,330	8.02	1,662.1
Bellosguardo	639	16.75	38.1
Bracigliano	5,343	14.41	370.8
Buccino	4,462	65.92	67.7
Buonabitacolo	2,454	15.54	157.9
Caggiano	2,486	35.43	70.2
Calvanico	1,407	14.91	94.4
Camerota	6,741	70.58	95.5
Campagna	17,194	136.31	126.1
Campora	297	29.15	10.2
Cannalonga	939	17.75	52.9
Capaccio	22,463	113.03	198.7
Casal Velino	5,368	31.71	169.3
Casalbuono	1,013	34.82	29.1
Casaletto Spartano	1,222	86.57	14.1
Caselle in Pittari	1,860	45.56	40.8
Castel San Giorgio	13,758	13.59	1,012.4
Castel San Lorenzo	2,182	14.29	152.7
Castelcivita	1,370	57.64	23.8
Castellabate	8,672	37.43	231.7
Castelnuovo Cilento	2,849	18.06	157.8
Castelnuovo di Conza	557	14.06	39.6
Castiglione del Genovesi	1,280	10.41	123.0
Cava de' Tirreni	49,330	36.53	1,350.4
Celle di Bulgheria	1,677	31.62	53.0
Centola	5,020	47.75	105.1
Ceraso	2,195	46.46	47.2
Cetara	1,886	4.97	379.5
Cicerale	1,178	41.37	28.5
Colliano	3,387	55.16	61.4
Conca dei Marini	635	1.13	561.9
Controne	757	7.75	97.7
Contursi Terme	3,158	28.93	109.2
Corbara	2,518	6.73	374.1
Corleto Monforte	462	58.97	7.8
Cuccaro Vetere	510	17.66	28.9
Eboli	37,656	137.58	273.7
Felitto	1,140	41.53	27.5
Fisciano	14,237	31.69	449.3
Furore	678	1.88	360.6
Futani	1,048	14.85	70.6
Giffoni Sei Casali	4,951	35.08	141.1
Giffoni Valle Piana	11,461	88.61	129.3
Gioi	1,058	27.99	37.8
Giungano	1,305	11.70	111.5
Ispani	971	8.34	116.4
Laureana Cilento	1,255	13.74	91.3
Laurino	1,200	70.46	17.0
Laurito	647	20.22	32.0
Laviano	1,261	55.68	22.6
Lustra	1,005	15.24	65.9
Magliano Vetere	573	23.30	24.6
Maiori	5,211	16.67	312.6
Mercato San Severino	21,309	30.33	702.6
Minori	2,528	2.66	950.4
Moio della Civitella	1,810	17.19	105.3
Montano Antilia	1,644	33.44	49.2
Monte San Giacomo	1,354	51.69	26.2
Montecorice	2,592	22.25	116.5
Montecorvino Pugliano	11,212	28.88	388.2
Montecorvino Rovella	12,308	42.16	291.9
Monteforte Cilento	531	22.17	24.0
Montesano sulla Marcellana	6,281	110.22	57.0
Morigerati	577	21.19	27.2
Nocera Inferiore	43,291	20.95	2,066.4
Nocera Superiore	23,396	14.66	1,595.9
Novi Velia	2,328	34.71	67.1
Ogliastro Cilento	2,307	13.24	174.2
Olevano sul Tusciano	6,571	26.72	245.9
Oliveto Citra	3,601	31.62	113.9
Omignano	1,636	10.10	162.0
Orria	887	26.55	33.4
Ottati	564	53.61	10.5
Padula	4,775	67.12	71.1
Pagani	35,117	11.98	2,931.3
Palomonte	3,772	28.30	133.3
Pellezzano	10,824	14.04	770.9
Perdifumo	1,802	23.81	75.7
Perito	763	24.00	31.8
Pertosa	632	6.16	102.6
Petina	984	35.47	27.7
Piaggine	1,056	62.77	16.8
Pisciotta	2,416	31.24	77.3
Polla	5,084	48.08	105.7
Pollica	2,048	28.17	72.7
Pontecagnano Faiano	26,334	37.19	708.1
Positano	3,643	8.65	421.2
Postiglione	2,019	48.24	41.9
Praiano	1,920	2.67	719.1
Prignano Cilento	1,111	12.04	92.3
Ravello	2,335	7.94	294.1
Ricigliano	1,039	27.92	37.2
Roccadaspide	6,900	64.16	107.5
Roccagloriosa	1,535	40.56	37.8
Roccapiemonte	8,676	5.31	1,633.9
Rofrano	1,222	63.59	19.2
Romagnano al Monte	369	9.67	38.2
Roscigno	570	15.18	37.5
Rutino	744	9.69	76.8
Sacco	394	23.66	16.7
Sala Consilina	12,103	59.70	202.7
Salento	1,734	23.79	72.9
Salerno	125,323	59.85	2,094.0
Salvitelle	457	9.60	47.6
San Cipriano Picentino	6,738	17.39	387.5
San Giovanni a Piro	3,591	37.90	94.7
San Gregorio Magno	3,798	50.05	75.9
San Mango Piemonte	2,616	6.02	434.6
San Marzano sul Sarno	10,209	5.19	1,967.1
San Mauro Cilento	824	15.28	53.9
San Mauro La Bruca	500	19.05	26.2
San Pietro al Tanagro	1,699	15.51	109.5
San Rufo	1,585	31.96	49.6
San Valentino Torio	10,994	9.16	1,200.2
Sant'Angelo a Fasanella	498	32.61	15.3
Sant'Arsenio	2,639	20.14	131.0
Sant'Egidio del Monte Albino	7,683	7.25	1,059.7
Santa Marina	3,220	28.36	113.5
Santomenna	368	8.92	41.3
Sanza	2,313	128.75	18.0
Sapri	6,261	14.20	440.9
Sarno	30,937	40.00	773.4
Sassano	4,680	47.76	98.0
Scafati	47,574	19.90	2,390.7
Scala	1,507	13.86	108.7
Serramezzana	272	7.23	37.6
Serre	3,671	67.03	54.8
Sessa Cilento	1,129	18.04	62.6
Siano	9,226	8.57	1,076.5
Sicignano degli Alburni	3,057	81.11	37.7
Stella Cilento	612	14.52	42.1
Stio	759	24.28	31.3
Teggiano	6,967	61.87	112.6
Torchiara	1,908	8.46	225.5
Torraca	1,214	16.01	75.8
Torre Orsaia	1,928	21.03	91.7
Tortorella	462	34.22	13.5
Tramonti	4,209	24.83	169.5
Trentinara	1,573	23.44	67.1
Valle dell'Angelo	217	36.60	5.9
Vallo della Lucania	7,779	25.32	307.2
Valva	1,539	26.79	57.4
Vibonati	3,235	20.54	157.5
Vietri sul Mare	6,878	9.52	722.5

== See also ==
- List of municipalities of Campania
- List of municipalities of Italy
