= Buccino =

- Comune
- Comune di Buccino
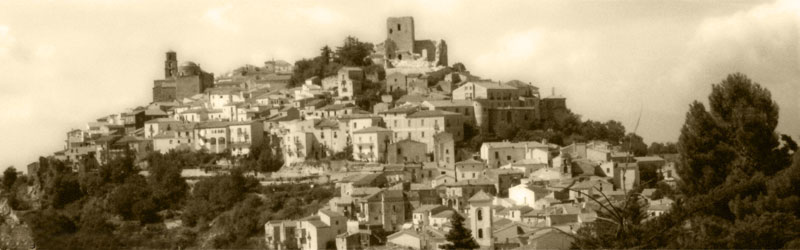

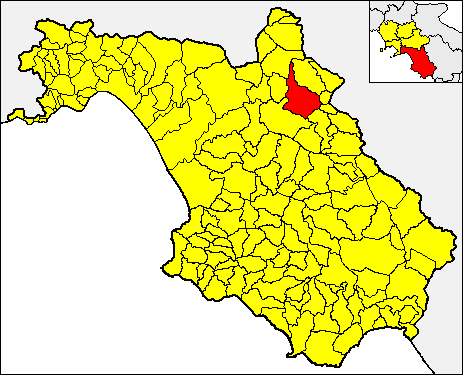
- Buccino within the Province of Salerno

- Location within Italy Location within Campania
- Coordinates: 40°38′N 15°23′E
- Country: Italy
- Region: Campania
- Province: Salerno (SA)
- Frazioni: Buccino Scalo, Pianelle, San Giovanni, Teglia, Temponi, Tufariello

Area
  - Total: 65.48 km^{2} (25.28 sq mi)
- Elevation: 663 m (2,175 ft)

Population (31 December 2004)
  - Total: 5,555
  - Density: 84.84/km^{2} (219.7/sq mi)
- Demonym: Buccinesi
- Time zone: UTC+1 (CET)
  - Summer (DST): UTC+2 (CEST)
- Postal code: 84021
- Dialing code: 0828
- ISTAT code: 065017
- Patron saint: Santa Maria Immacolata
- Saint day: Prima domenica di Luglio
- Website: Official website

Buccino is a town and comune in Campania in Italy, in the province of Salerno, located about 700 m above sea level.

== Geography ==
The municipality borders with Auletta, Colliano, Palomonte, Romagnano al Monte, Salvitelle, San Gregorio Magno and Sicignano degli Alburni. It counts the hamlets (frazioni) of Buccino Scalo, Pianelle, San Giovanni, Teglia, Temponi and Tufariello.

== History ==
In Roman times, the town was known as Volcei. It was the chief town of the independent tribe of the Volceiani, Vulcientes or Volcentani, whose territory was bounded north by that of the Hirpini, west and south by Lucania and east by the territory of Venusia. Some pre-Roman ruins still exist. It became a municipium, and in 323 CE had an extensive territory attached to it, including the town of Numistro, the large Cyclopean walls of which may still be seen, 35 km below Muro Lucano.

== Main sights ==
Below the town is a well-preserved Roman bridge over the Tanagro river.

== Religion ==
There are three Roman Catholic parishes in Buccino: Santa Croce in Gerusalemme; Santa Maria Assunta e San Giovanni Gerosolimitano; and Santa Maria Solditta in San Antonio Abate. All three belong to the deanery of Caggiano in the Archdiocese of Salerno-Campagna-Acerno. The three parishes are in the care of Don Vincenzo Ruggiero, appointed priest in July 2020.

There are 9 places of worship:

- The Parish Church of Santa Croce in Gerusalemme on the Via S. Croce;
- The Parish Church of Sant'Antonio Abate in the Piazza S. Antonio Abata;
- The Parish Church of Santa Maria Assunta in the Piazza R. Giuliani;
- The Church of San Nicola della Piazza and the Chapel of Madonna delle Lacrime, respectively a subsidiary church and subsidiary chapel belonging to the Parish of Santa Maria Assunta e San Giovanni;
- The Church of San Giuseppe, a subsidiary church belonging to the Parish of Santa Maria Solditta;
- The Church of Santa Maria delle Grazia, a subsidiary of the Sanctuary of Maria Santissima Immocolata;
- The Church of San Giovanni Gerosolomitano, a subsidiary of the Parish of Santa Maria Assunta e San Giovanni;
- The Church of Santissima Annunziata, a subsidiary of the Church of Santa Croce.
