= Elford (name) =

Elford is an English surname and occasionally a given name. Notable people with the name include:

Given name

- Elford Albin Cederberg (1918–2006), American politician from Michigan

Surname

- John Elford (fl. 1966–1976), Australian rugby league footballer
- John Paul Elford (1922–1991), American Roman Catholic priest
- Keith A. Elford, bishop emeritus of the Free Methodist Church in Canada
- Richard Elford (c. 1677–1714), English singer
- Shane Elford (born 1977) Australian rugby league player
- Vic Elford (1935–2022) English sportscar racing, rallying and Formula One driver
- Sir William Elford, 1st Baronet (1749–1837), English banker, politician, and amateur artist

As part of a compound surname

- William Elford Leach (1791–1836), English zoologist and marine biologist
- Lateef Elford-Alliyu (born 1992) is an English football striker

== Places ==
- Elford, village in Staffordshire, England
- North Ravenswood, West Virginia, United States; a neighborhood of the city of Ravenswood in Jackson County, West Virginia; it used to be called Elford.
