= Bottaro Canal =

Location
- Country: Italy
- Region: Campania
- Provinces: Naples, Salerno

Physical characteristics
- Length: 6.00 km

Basin features
- Cities: Scafati, Pompei, Torre Annunziata

The Bottaro Canal (Italian: Canale Bottaro or Bottajo) is a canal in Campania, Italy.

== Reclamation ==
Under the Sarno Comprehensive Land Reclamation Consortium, the first reclamation effort took place in the 1990s; part of the canal was later dredged and reclaimed while General Roberto Jucci served as the consortium's commissioner, in the early 2000s. The works were blocked because difficulties arose in finding suitable deposits to house the collected sludge, and the deposits turned out to contain traces of asbestos.In 2018, the Campania region approved a plan to clean up the canal, in order to remove 10,000 cubic meters of debris, accumulated during the period in which it was used as a floodway, at a cost of over 1,300,000 euros.
