= Punta Fortino Lighthouse =

Lighthouse in Campania, Italy

Punta Fortino
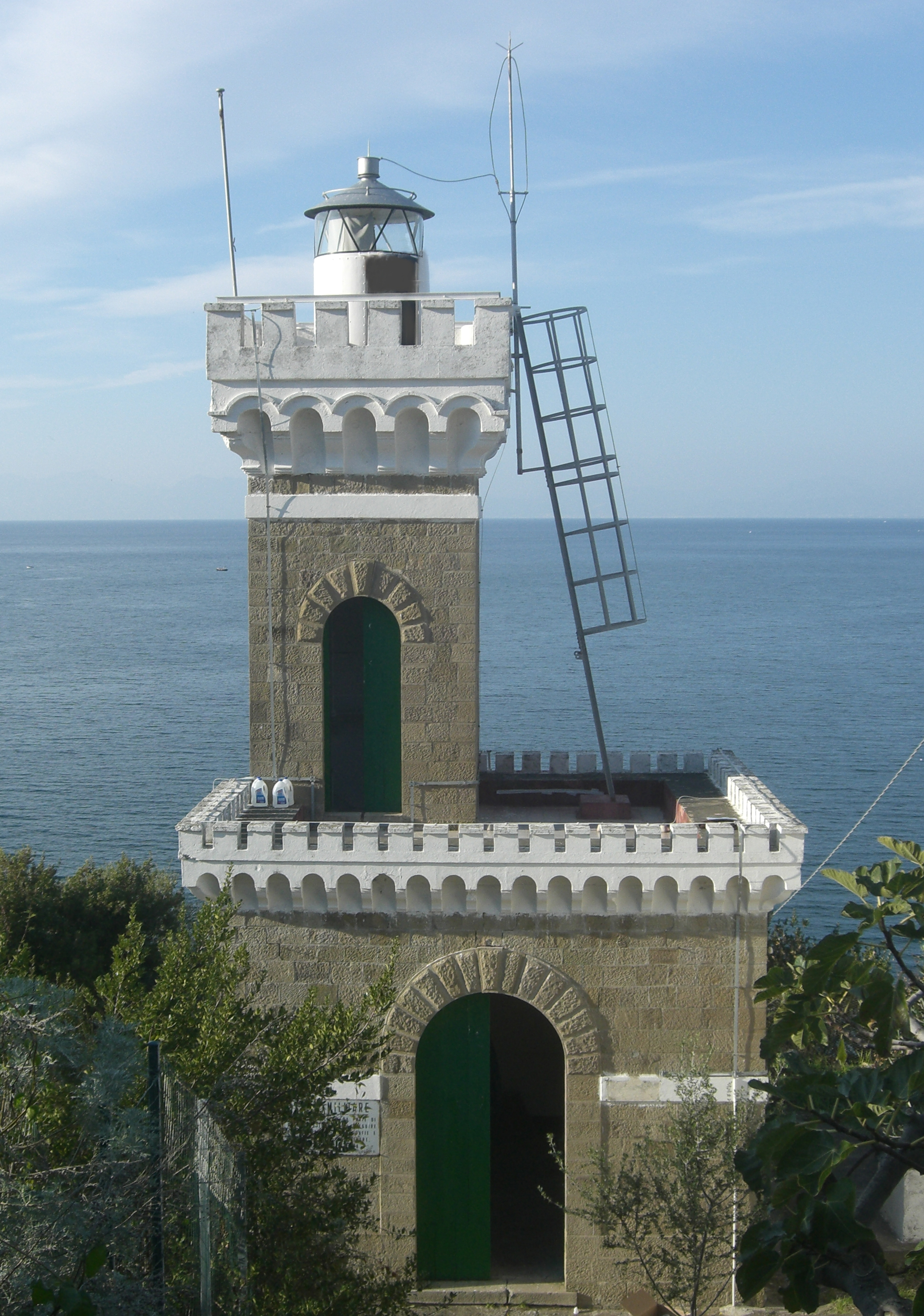
- Punta Fortino Lighthouse
- Location: Agropoli; Campania; Italy
- Coordinates: 40°21′18″N 14°59′13″E

Tower
- Constructed: 1923
- Foundation: concrete base
- Construction: stone tower
- Automated: yes
- Height: 10 metres (33 ft)
- Shape: quadrangular tower with balcony and lantern on a square building
- Markings: unpainted stone tower, grey metallic lantern
- Power source: mains electricity
- Operator: Marina Militare

Light
- Focal height: 42 metres (138 ft)
- Lens: Type TD
- Intensity: main: AL 1000 W reserve: LABI 100 W
- Range: main: 16 nautical miles (30 km; 18 mi) reserve: 11 nautical miles (20 km; 13 mi)
- Characteristic: L Fl (2) W 6s.
- Italy no.: 2660 E.F.

Punta Fortino Lighthouse (Italian: Faro di Punta Fortino) is an active lighthouse at the northern point of Agropoli, Campania on the Tyrrhenian Sea.

== Description ==
The lighthouse was built in 1923 and consists of a one-storey stone square prism building with the tower rising at a corner, 10 feet (3.0 m) high, with embattled parapet and lantern. The lantern painted in white and the dome in grey metallic, is positioned at 42 metres (138 ft) above sea level and emits two long white flashes in a six seconds period, visible up to a distance of 16 nautical miles (30 km; 18 mi). The lighthouse is completely automated and operated by the Marina Militare with the identification code number 2660 E.F.

== See also ==
- List of lighthouses in Italy
- Agropoli
