= Ricigliano =

- Comune
- Comune di Ricigliano
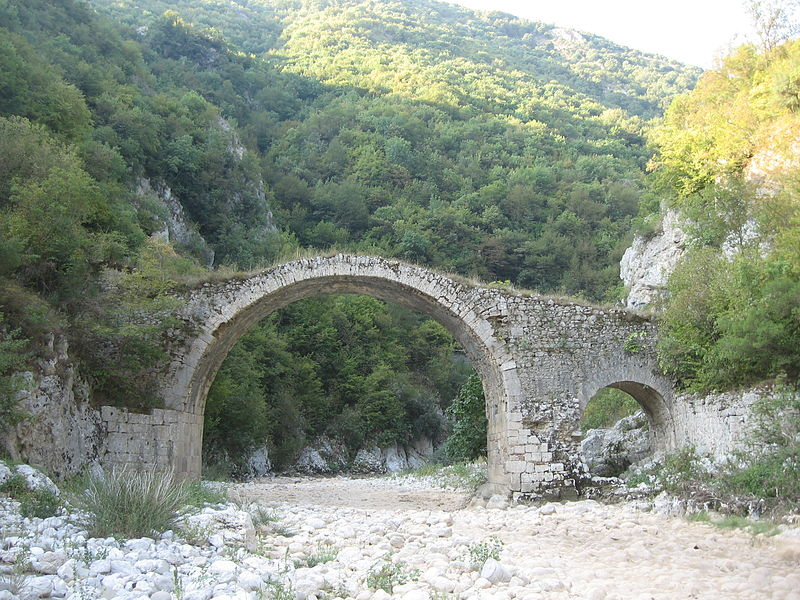
- Hannibal's Bridge on the river Melandro

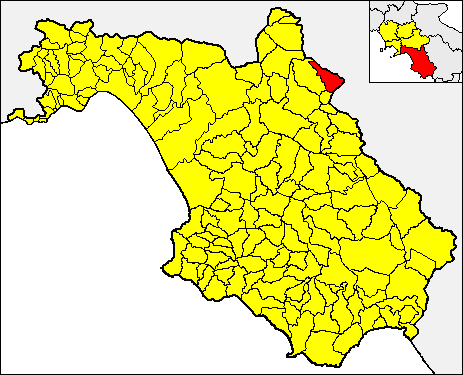
- Ricigliano within the Province of Salerno

- Location within Italy Location within Campania
- Coordinates: 40°40′N 15°29′E
- Country: Italy
- Region: Campania
- Province: Salerno (SA)

Area
  - Total: 27 km^{2} (10 sq mi)
- Elevation: 560 m (1,840 ft)

Population (1 April 2009)
  - Total: 1,283
  - Density: 48/km^{2} (120/sq mi)
- Demonym: Riciglianesi
- Time zone: UTC+1 (CET)
  - Summer (DST): UTC+2 (CEST)
- Postal code: 84020
- Dialing code: 0828
- ISTAT code: 065105
- Patron saint: san Cristoforo
- Saint day: 25 July
- Website: Official website

Ricigliano is a town and comune in the province of Salerno in the Campania region of south-western Italy.

== Geography ==
The municipality borders with Balvano (PZ), Muro Lucano (PZ), Romagnano al Monte and San Gregorio Magno.
