= Colliano =

- Comune
- Comune di Colliano
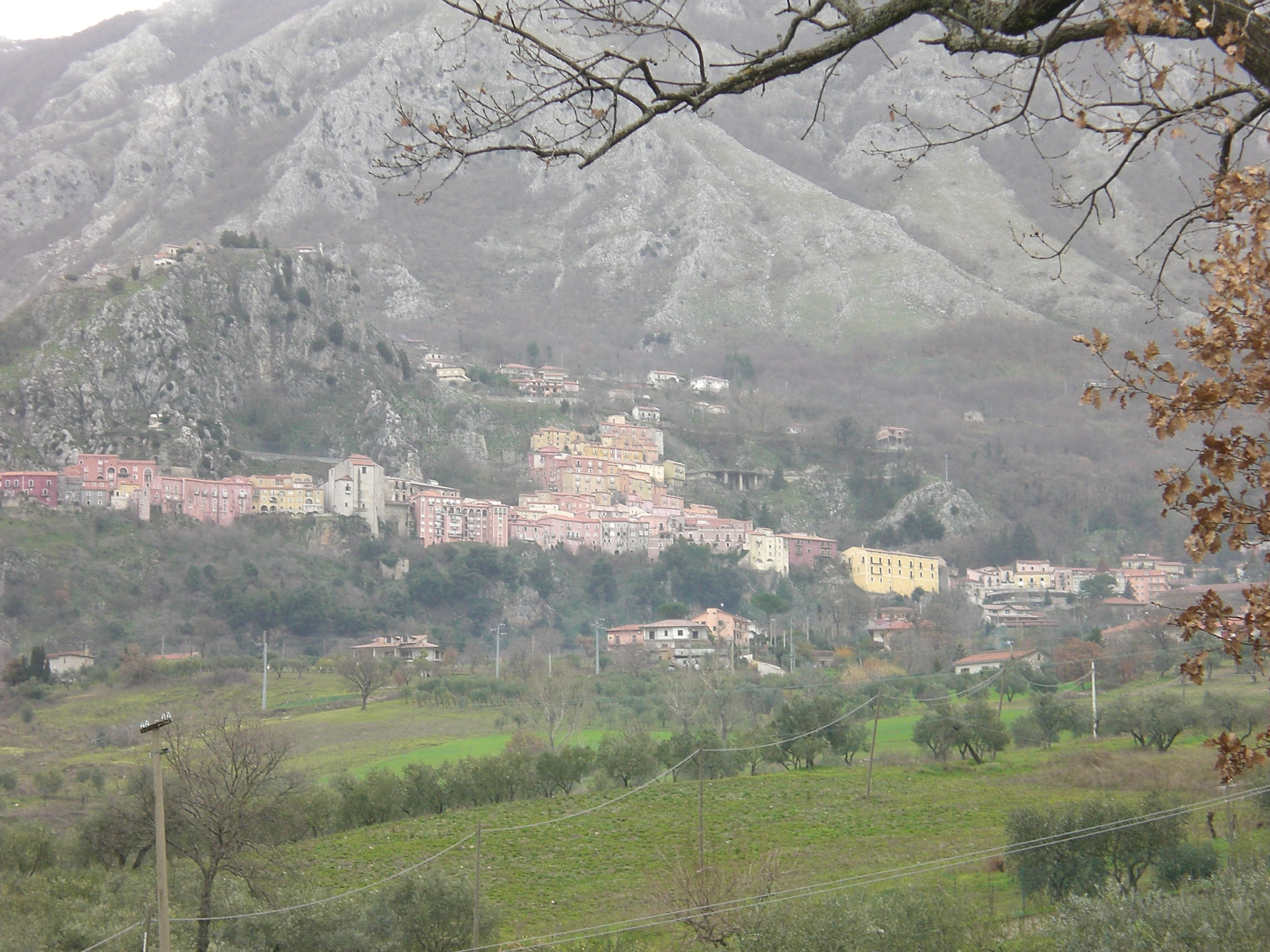
- View of Colliano and Collianello (on the top of the hill)

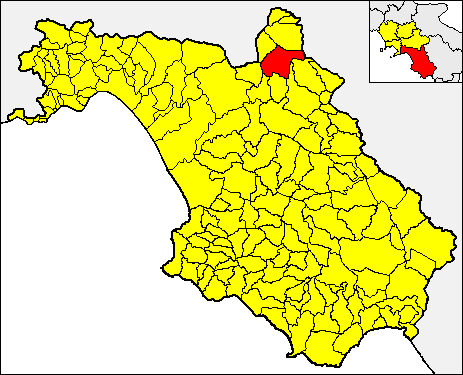
- Colliano within the Province of Salerno

- Location within Italy Location within Campania
- Coordinates: 40°44′N 15°17′E
- Country: Italy
- Region: Campania
- Province: Salerno (SA)
- Frazioni: Bagni, Bisigliano, Collianello, Macchia Grande, Macchia Piccola, San Vittore, Sasso, Valle di Raio

Area
  - Total: 54 km^{2} (21 sq mi)

Population (1 April 2009)
  - Total: 3,813
  - Density: 71/km^{2} (180/sq mi)
- Demonym: Collianesi
- Time zone: UTC+1 (CET)
  - Summer (DST): UTC+2 (CEST)
- Postal code: 84020
- Dialing code: 0828
- ISTAT code: 065043
- Patron saint: St. Leo IX
- Saint day: 20 July
- Website: Official website

Colliano (Campanian: Cuglian) is a town and comune in the province of Salerno in the Campania region of south-western Italy. The name is likely related to the Italian word, collinare, which means hill top.

== Geography ==
The municipality borders with Buccino, Contursi Terme, Laviano, Muro Lucano (PZ, Basilicata region), Oliveto Citra, Palomonte, San Gregorio Magno and Valva.

== See also ==
- Collianello
- Piano di Pecore
