= Romagnano =

Romagnano may refer to:

- Romagnano al Monte, Italian municipality of the province of Salerno
- Romagnano Sesia, Italian municipality of the province of Novara
