= Prignani =

Prignani can refer to:

- Francesco Moricotti Prignani (died 1394), Italian Roman Catholic bishop and Cardinal
- Pope Urban VI (1318 – 1389), Bartholomew Prignani, Roman Catholic Pope

== See also ==
- Prignano (disambiguation)
