= Laureana =

Laureana may refer to:

Places

- Laureana Cilento, Italian municipality of the province of Salerno
- Laureana di Borrello, Italian municipality of the province of Reggio Calabria
