= Prignano =

Prignano may refer to:

- Prignano Cilento, Italian municipality of the province of Salerno
- Prignano sulla Secchia, Italian municipality of the province of Modena
- Bartolomeo Prignano, the name at birth of Pope Urban VI.
