= Lustra, Campania =

Lustra
- Comune
- Comune di Lustra
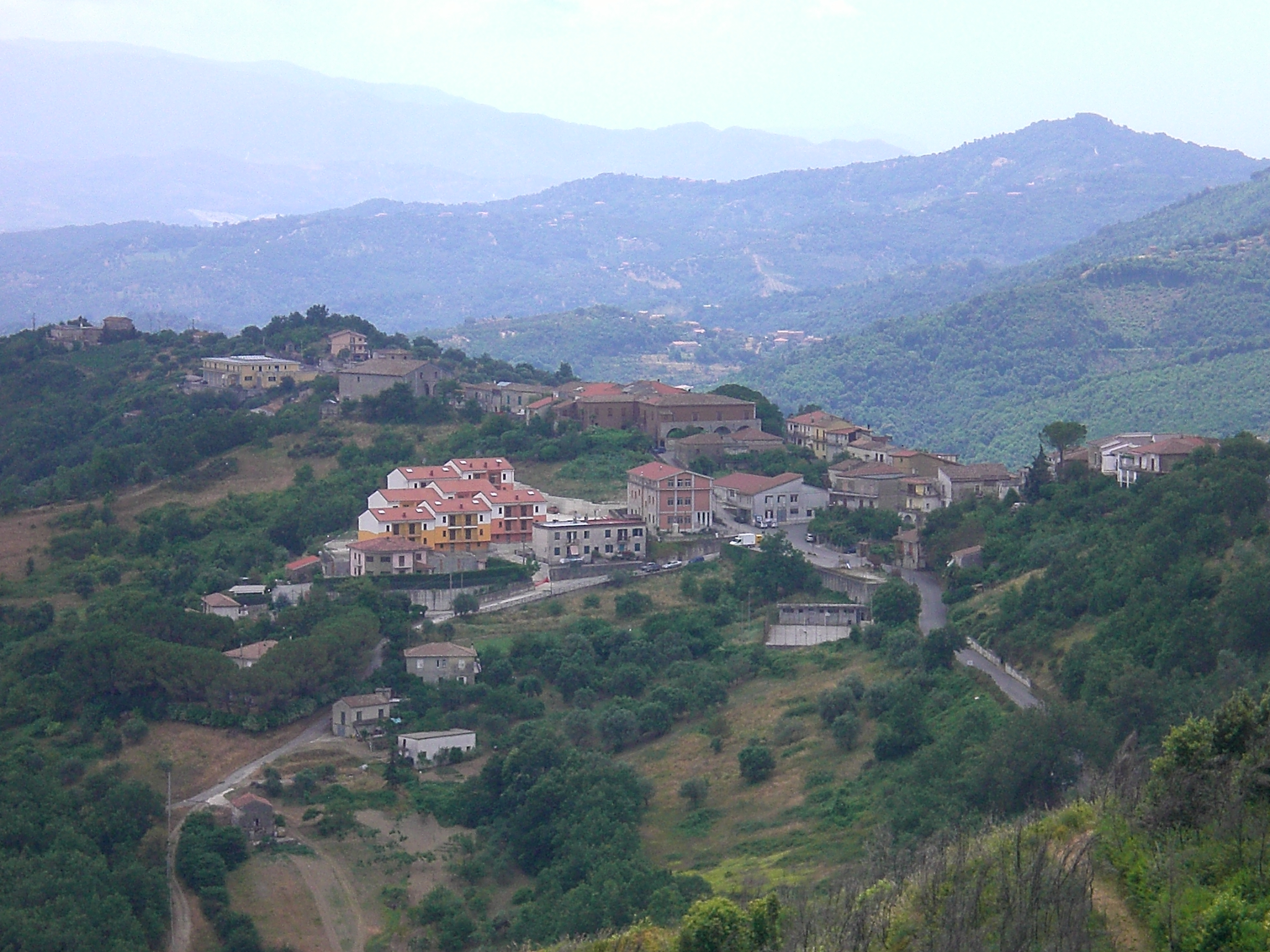

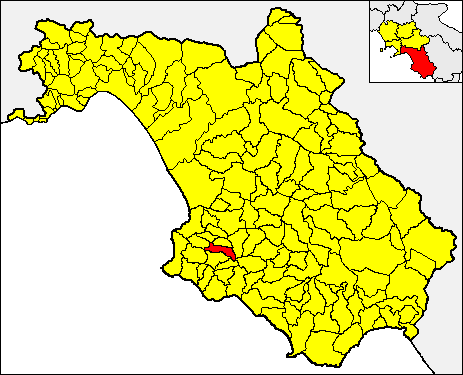
- Lustra within the Province of Salern

- Location within Italy Location within Campania
- Coordinates: 40°17′N 15°4′E
- Country: Italy
- Region: Campania
- Province: Salerno (SA)
- Frazioni: Corticelle, Monacelli, Ponti Rossi, Rocca Cilento, Selva Cilento.

Government
  - Mayor: Giuseppe Castellano

Area
  - Total: 15.24 km^{2} (5.88 sq mi)

Population (30 September 2017)
  - Total: 1,044
  - Density: 68.50/km^{2} (177.4/sq mi)
- Demonym: Lustresi
- Time zone: UTC+1 (CET)
  - Summer (DST): UTC+2 (CEST)
- Postal code: 84050
- Dialing code: 0974
- ISTAT code: 065064
- Website: Official website

Lustra is a town and comune in the province of Salerno, in the Campania region of south-western Italy.

== Geography ==
The municipality borders Laureana Cilento, Omignano, Perdifumo, Perito, Rutino, Salento, Sessa Cilento and Torchiara. It includes the frazioni of Corticelle, Monacelli, Ponti Rossi, Rocca Cilento and Selva Cilento.

== See also ==
- Cilento
