= Salvitelle =

- Comune
- Comune di Salvitelle
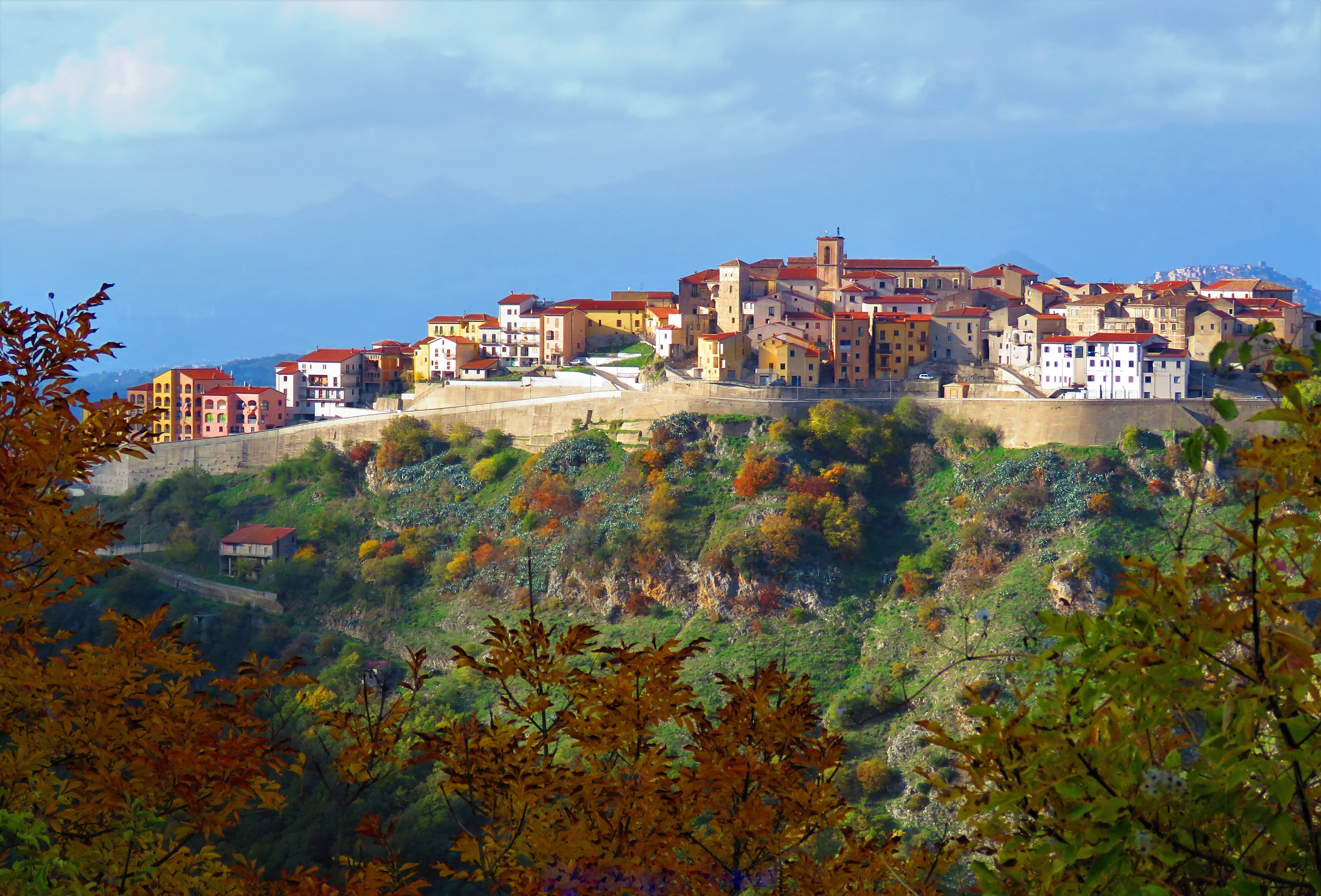

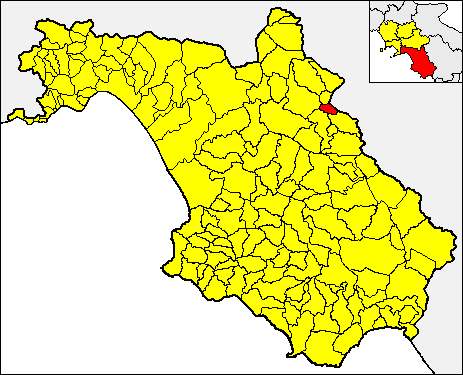
- Salvitelle within the Province of Salerno

- Location within Italy Location within Campania
- Coordinates: 40°36′N 15°28′E
- Country: Italy
- Region: Campania
- Province: Salerno (SA)

Area
  - Total: 9 km^{2} (3.5 sq mi)
- Elevation: 630 m (2,070 ft)

Population (1 December 2009)
  - Total: 609
  - Density: 68/km^{2} (180/sq mi)
- Demonym: Salvitellesi
- Time zone: UTC+1 (CET)
  - Summer (DST): UTC+2 (CEST)
- Postal code: 84020
- Dialing code: 0975
- ISTAT code: 065117
- Patron saint: San Sebastiano
- Saint day: 20 January and the last Sunday in August
- Website: Official website

Salvitelle (Campanian: Salvtell) is a town and comune in the province of Salerno in the Campania region of southwestern Italy.

== Geography ==
The municipality borders with Auletta, Buccino, Caggiano, Romagnano al Monte and Vietri di Potenza (PZ).

== Monuments and Places of Interest ==
- Chapel of St. Sebastian (1557-1558),
- Church of SS. Rosario (1740),
- Church of the Holy Spirit (1800),
- Grassibelli Palace,
- Mucci Palace,
- Romanzi Palace,
- Briganti Palace.
