= Rutino =

- Comune
- Comune di Rutino
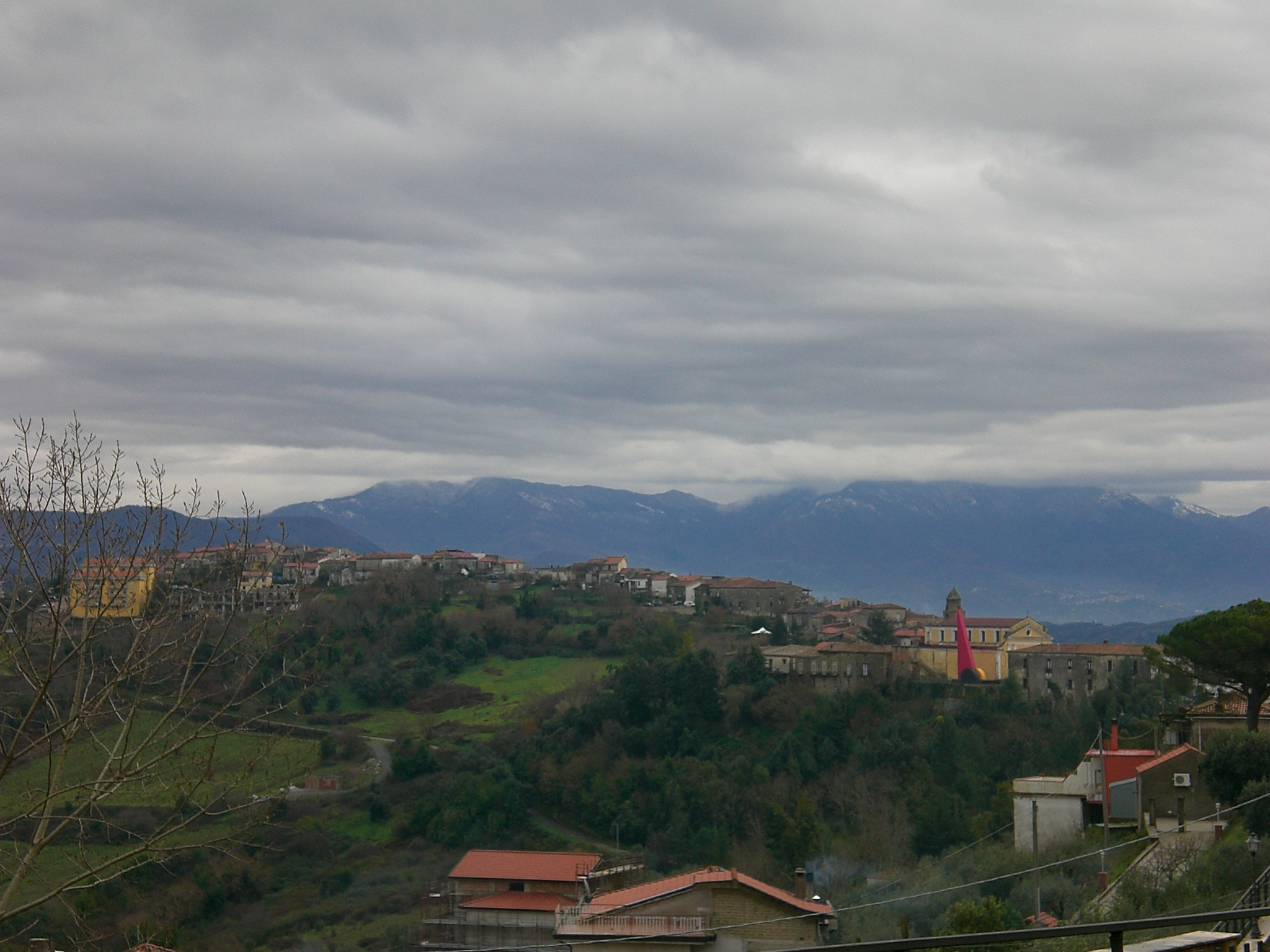

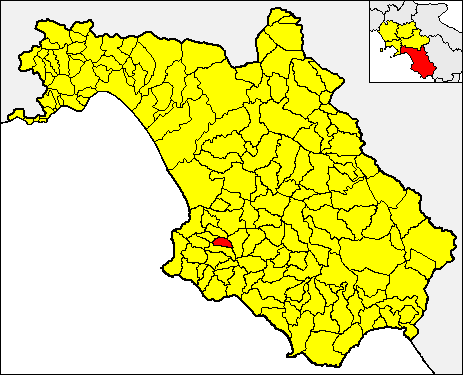
- Rutino within the Province of Salerno

- Location within Italy Location within Campania
- Coordinates: 40°18′N 15°4′E
- Country: Italy
- Region: Campania
- Province: Salerno (SA)
- Frazioni: Rutino Scalo

Government
  - Mayor: Voria Michele (Civic Party (Lista Civica))

Area
  - Total: 9.64 km^{2} (3.72 sq mi)
- Elevation: 371 m (1,217 ft)

Population (1 April 2009)
  - Total: 883
  - Density: 91.6/km^{2} (237/sq mi)
- Time zone: UTC+1 (CET)
  - Summer (DST): UTC+2 (CEST)
- Postal code: 84070
- Dialing code: 0974
- ISTAT code: 065112
- Patron saint: San Michele Arcangelo
- Saint day: Second Sunday of May
- Website: www.comune.rutino.sa.it/

Rutino is a town and comune in the province of Salerno in the Campania region of southwestern Italy. It is in the geographic region Cilento.

== Politic geography ==
The comune is divided into Rutino, the principal city, and the "frazione" of Rutino Scalo. It borders Lustra, Perito, Prignano Cilento, Torchiara. The two most important cities near Rutino are Agropoli and Vallo della Lucania.

== Physical geography ==
Rutino is the agricultural center of the lower Cilento, on the right side of the middle valley dell'Alento, on a spur of the hill on top of which stands the castle of Rocca Cilento. The build-up presents a typical elongated structure, the axis of development being constituted by the state Tirrena. It is in Seismic Zone 3 (low seismicity).

== History ==
The date of foundation of the country is not known. The house is indicated for the first time under the name of Ruticinum (in locum Ruticini) in a document of 954. This speaks of the "Translatio", the remains of the body of the apostle St. Matthew from Duoflumina (Casal Velino) to Caputaquis (Capaccio) and from there to Salerno.

The country in the eleventh century was a house of the Barony of Cilento, Sanseverino family feud from 1276. Sold in 1535 by Ferrante Sanseverino Francis de Rogerio, in 1538 it passed to the latter's son, Gian Lorenzo. It later belonged to Giovanni Gomez together with the Castle Rock, which followed the events.

From 1811 to 1860, under the name Rotino, was part of the district Torchiara, the District of Vallo of the Kingdom of the Two Sicilies.

From 1860 to 1927, during the Kingdom of Italy was part of the district of Torchiara, belonging to the district of Vallo della Lucania.

During the Second World War the town was occupied by German troops who were camped in the old sports field. Until the opening of the new provincial road 417, which starts and ends in Agropoli Sapri, was an important stop on the route of highway 18 Tirrena Inferiore.

After the Second World War the village: Rutino Scalo possessed a train station that has been closed in the last 90s.

== Culture ==
=== Schools ===
In this comune there are three schools, a preschool, an elementary school, and the middle school "Michele Magnoni". The nearest secondary schools are in Vallo della Lucania and Agropoli. The nearest university is in Salerno (Fasano).

=== The Flight of the Angel ===
The most important holiday that is celebrated throughout the year is that of the patron St. Michael the Archangel. The festival falls on the second Sunday of May and is celebrated with a solemn religious rite. The statue of the saint is carried in procession through the streets of the town and is accompanied by Catholic associations, from the band and from many of the faithful. The procession is characterized by two key moments:

- The first is a brief stop to watch the fireworks have become famous for their durability and their powerful explosive charge that pierces the sky and makes the earth tremble: it is a show overwhelming and exciting.

The procession continues and arrived at the square carriers lie on a table the Statue of San Michele placing it in front of the stage, decorated for the occasion, which acts as hell.

- The second moment is the sacred representation of the battle between the Archangel Michael and Lucifer.

The Angel from the loggia of the parsonage harnessed to a pulley sliding on a rope. Is advanced slowly to stand in front of the stage which is Hell. A silence fell on the square where people flocked to better enjoy the show. The Angel begins the first part of the play by throwing a stern warning to Lucifer rebelling against God and tells him that his disobedience would cost him dearly. Lucifer says he is ready to fight and challenge the Angel. With this agreement ends the first part of the drama. The Angel accompanied by bursts of applause reaches the opposite side of the square and the statue of the "Prince of the Angels", in procession along the opposite side of the country (district Serra). The return of the procession came to the streets again, the Angel, equipped with a shield and sword back on the scene and faces the arch enemy Lucifer. The battle begins, and after a symbolic battle, the angel defeats the devil making him collapsing to the ground. Humiliated and confused Lucifer declared defeated and took refuge in hell. The Angel in taking the return flight sings a hymn of praise to heaven. The event concludes by returning the statue in the parish.

== Monuments and buildings of interest ==
   Palazzo Lombardi
   Palazzo Colombaia
   Church of Santa Maria dell'Arco
   Chapel of Our Lady of Chains
   Chapel of St. Joseph

=== Totem of Peace ===
It is a monumental work of Mario Molinari, who is the symbol adopted by leading countries of the world and that is taking place in over 200 cities from every continent.

=== Church of St. Michael the Archangel ===
This church is of medieval origin, the building has undergone a radical transformation in 1885. There are many statues kept the 600, a painting of Saint Lucia and in a service area is now used as a parish museum.

=== Rutino Scalo ===
The Church of St. Anne and St. Joachim, built in the 1950s.
