= North Ravenswood, West Virginia =

North Ravenswood
- Neighborhood
- Location within the state of West Virginia
- Coordinates: 38°57′38″N 81°46′7″W
- Country: United States
- State: West Virginia
- County: Jackson
- Elevation: 614 ft (187 m)
- Time zone: UTC-5 (Eastern (EST))
  - Summer (DST): UTC-4 (EDT)
- GNIS ID: 1560016

North Ravenswood is a neighborhood of Ravenswood in Jackson County, West Virginia, United States, and a former unincorporated community. It was formerly named Elford, and had its own post office.
