= Trentinara =

- Comune
- Comune di Trentinara
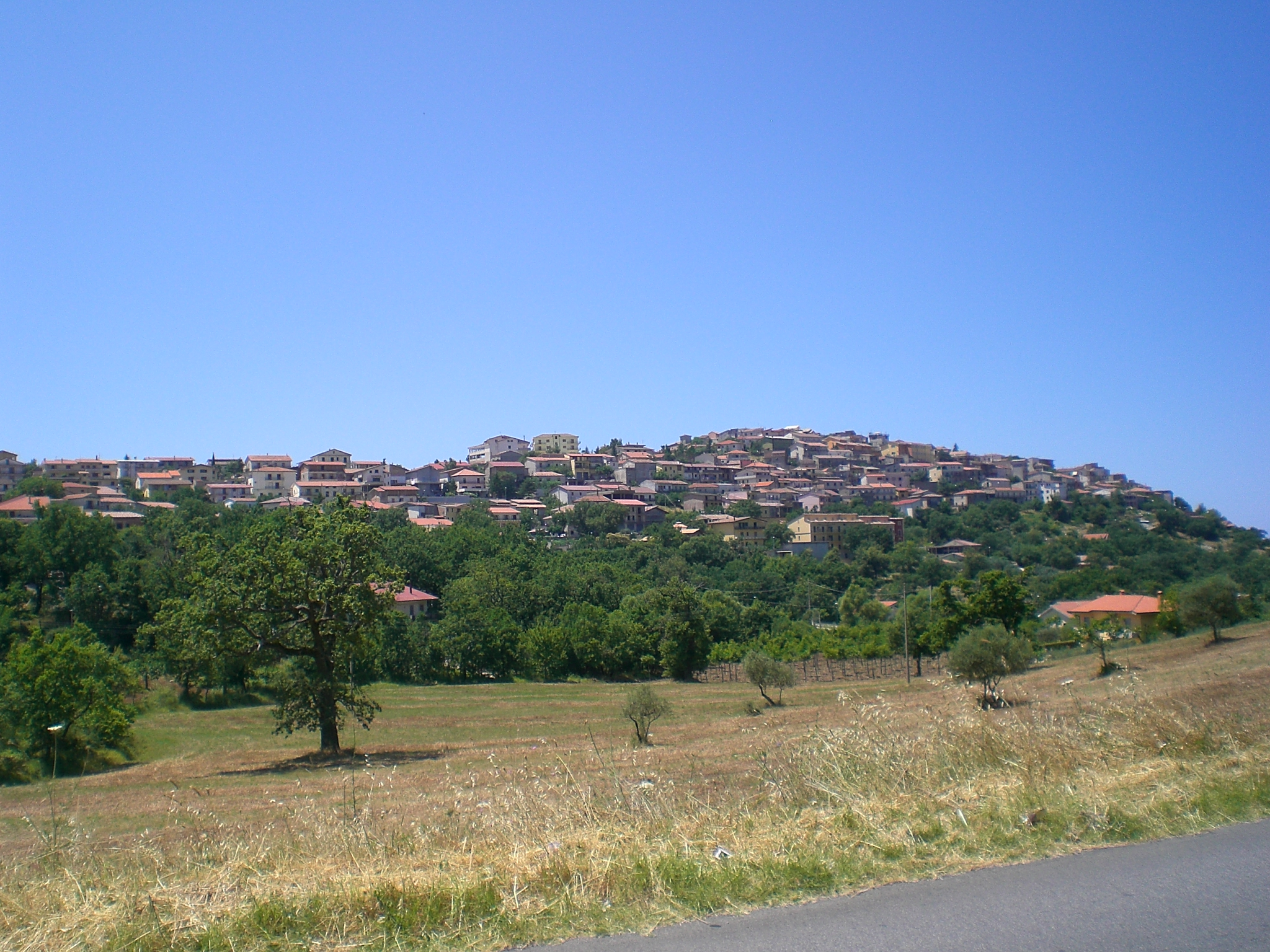

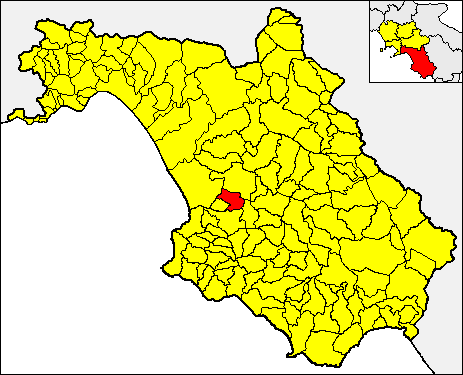
- Trentinara within the Province of Salerno

- Location within Italy Location within Campania
- Coordinates: 40°24′N 15°7′E
- Country: Italy
- Region: Campania
- Province: Province of Salerno (SA)

Government
  - Mayor: Rosario Carione

Area
  - Total: 23.44 km^{2} (9.05 sq mi)
- Elevation: 606 m (1,988 ft)

Population (31 December 2011)
  - Total: 1,769
  - Density: 75.47/km^{2} (195.5/sq mi)
- Demonym: Trentinaresi
- Time zone: UTC+1 (CET)
  - Summer (DST): UTC+2 (CEST)
- Postal code: 84070
- Dialing code: 0828
- Patron saint: Santa Irene di Tessalonica
- Saint day: 16 October
- Website: Official website

Trentinara is a town and comune near Paestum in the province of Salerno in the Campania region of south-western Italy.

== Geography ==
The municipality, located in northern Cilento, borders with Capaccio, Cicerale, Giungano, Monteforte Cilento and Roccadaspide. Known for its views and landscape, the area is sometimes referred to as "The Cilento's Terrace".

== See also ==
- Cilentan dialect
- Cilento and Vallo di Diano National Park
