= Santomenna =

- Comune
- Comune di Santomenna
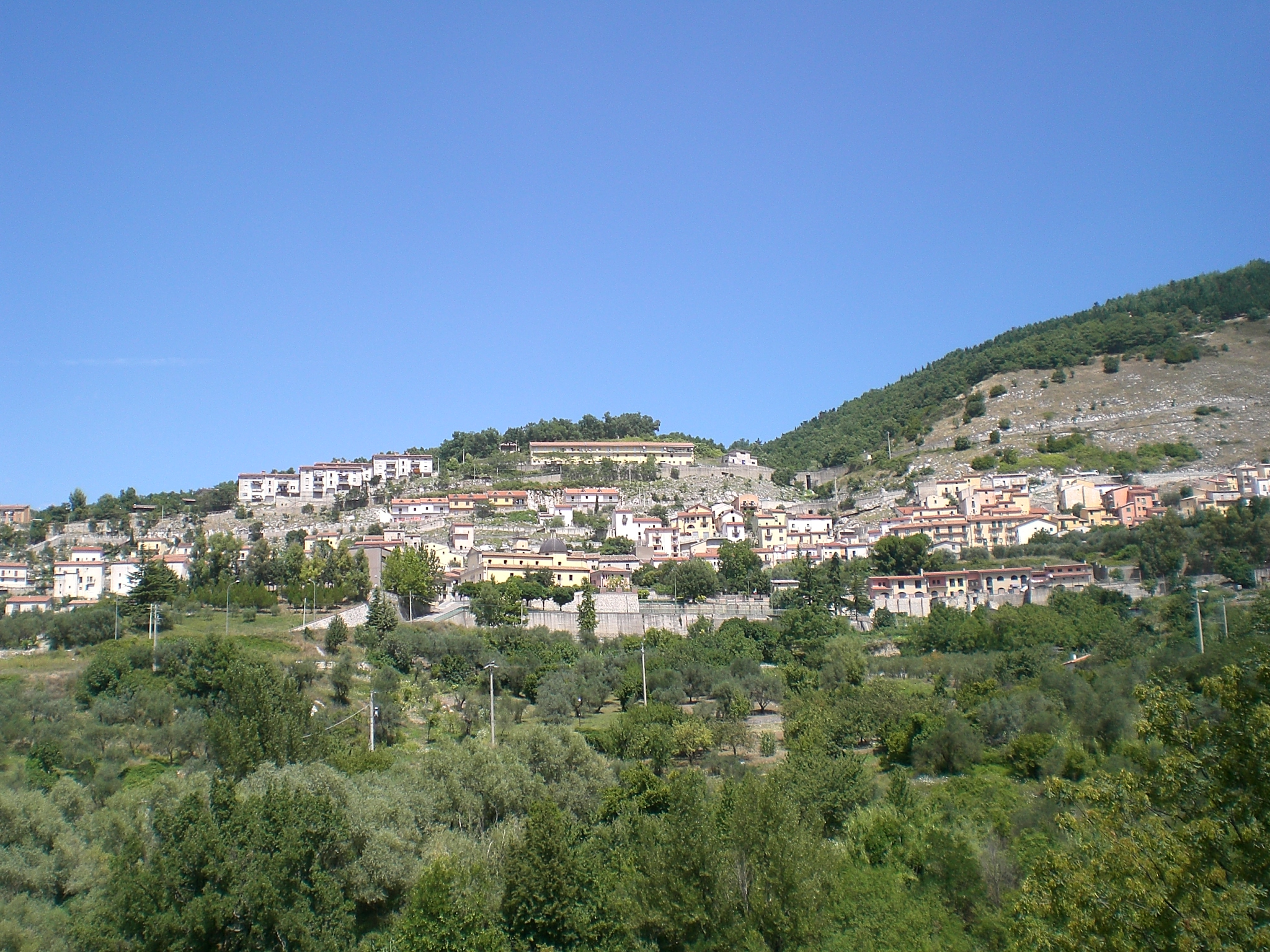

- Location within Italy Location within Campania
- Coordinates: 40°48′N 15°19′E
- Country: Italy
- Region: Campania
- Province: Salerno (SA)

Government
  - Mayor: Gerardo Venutolo

Area
  - Total: 8.92 km^{2} (3.44 sq mi)
- Elevation: 540 m (1,770 ft)

Population (31 May 2013)
  - Total: 461
  - Density: 51.7/km^{2} (134/sq mi)
- Demonym: Sammennesi
- Time zone: UTC+1 (CET)
  - Summer (DST): UTC+2 (CEST)
- Postal code: 84020
- Dialing code: 0828
- Patron saint: St. Menna
- Website: Official website

Santomenna is a town and comune in the province of Salerno in the Campania region of south-western Italy.
