= John Paul Elford =

American Roman Catholic priest

John Paul Elford (September 24, 1922 – February 6, 1991) was an American Roman Catholic priest who was appointed a bishop but declined the position and was never consecrated.

Born in Pittsburgh, Pennsylvania, on September 24, 1922, Elford moved with his family to Bloomington, Indiana, in 1944. He went to St. Meinrad Archabbey seminary and received his doctorate in sacred theology from Catholic University of America in Washington, D.C. Elford was ordained to the priesthood for the Archdiocese of Indianapolis on May 27, 1947. On July 15, 1968, Pope Paul VI appointed Elford titular bishop of Acropolis and auxiliary bishop of the Diocese of Fort Wayne–South Bend, Indiana.

In October 1968, Ellford announced that Pope Paul had granted his request to "dispense me from accepting the office of bishop". He offered no explanation and asked the public to accept what he had done "without question". He cited "personal reasons" and said he was "at peace" with the decision.

He died on February 6, 1991.
