= Cicerale =

- Comune
- Comune di Cicerale
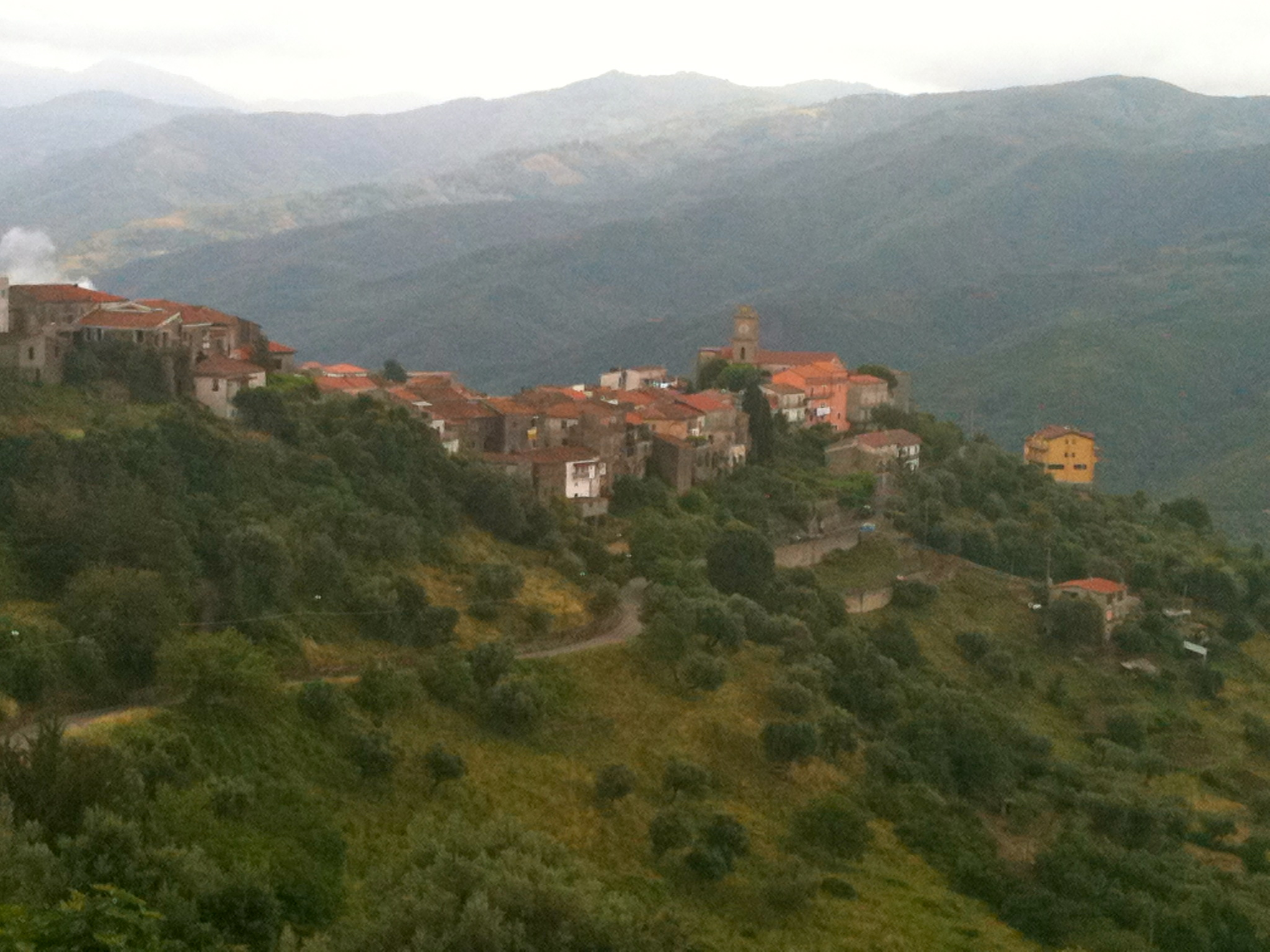

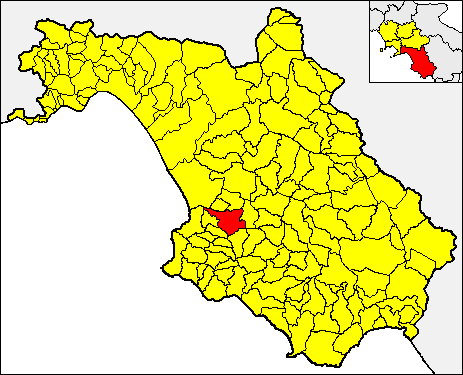
- Cicerale within the Province of Salerno

- Location within Italy Location within Campania
- Coordinates: 40°20′37.93″N 15°7′48.94″E
- Country: Italy
- Region: Campania
- Province: Salerno (SA)
- Frazioni: Monte Cicerale

Government
  - Mayor: Francesco Carpinelli

Area
  - Total: 41.37 km^{2} (15.97 sq mi)
- Elevation: 475 m (1,558 ft)

Population (28 February 2017)
  - Total: 1,202
  - Density: 29.05/km^{2} (75.25/sq mi)
- Demonym: Ciceralesi
- Time zone: UTC+1 (CET)
  - Summer (DST): UTC+2 (CEST)
- Postal code: 84053
- Dialing code: 0974
- ISTAT code: 065042
- Patron saint: Saint George
- Saint day: 19 August
- Website: Official website

Cicerale is a town and comune in the province of Salerno in the Campania region of south-western Italy.

== Geography ==
The municipality is located in Cilento and borders with Agropoli, Capaccio-Paestum, Giungano, Monteforte Cilento, Ogliastro Cilento, Perito, Prignano Cilento and Trentinara.

It counts a single hamlet (frazione), Monte Cicerale. Located 2 km far from the town, the village lies at an altitude of 550 m and has a population of 384.

== See also ==
- Alento river
- Cilentan dialect
- Cilento and Vallo di Diano National Park
