= Torchiara =

- Comune
- Comune di Torchiara
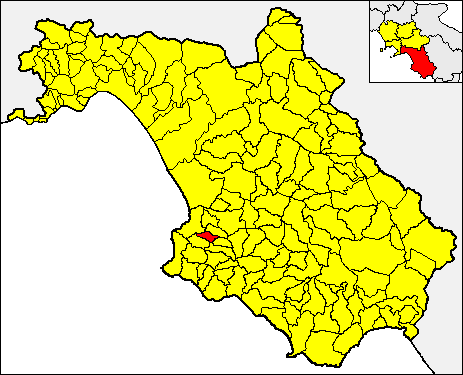
- Torchiara within the Province of Salerno

- Location within Italy Location within Campania
- Coordinates: 40°19′N 15°3′E
- Country: Italy
- Region: Campania
- Province: Salerno (SA)
- Frazioni: Copersito

Area
  - Total: 8 km^{2} (3.1 sq mi)
- Elevation: 360 m (1,180 ft)

Population (1 April 2009)
  - Total: 1,790
  - Density: 220/km^{2} (580/sq mi)
- Demonym: Torchiaresi
- Time zone: UTC+1 (CET)
  - Summer (DST): UTC+2 (CEST)
- Postal code: 84076
- Dialing code: 0974
- ISTAT code: 065147
- Patron saint: Santissimo Salvatore
- Saint day: 6 August
- Website: Official website

Torchiara is a town and comune in the province of Salerno in the Campania region of south-western Italy.

== Geography ==
The municipality borders with Agropoli, Laureana Cilento, Lustra, Prignano Cilento and Rutino. It counts the frazione of Copersito.

== See also ==
- Cilento
