= Ogliastro Cilento =

- Comune
- Comune di Ogliastro Cilento
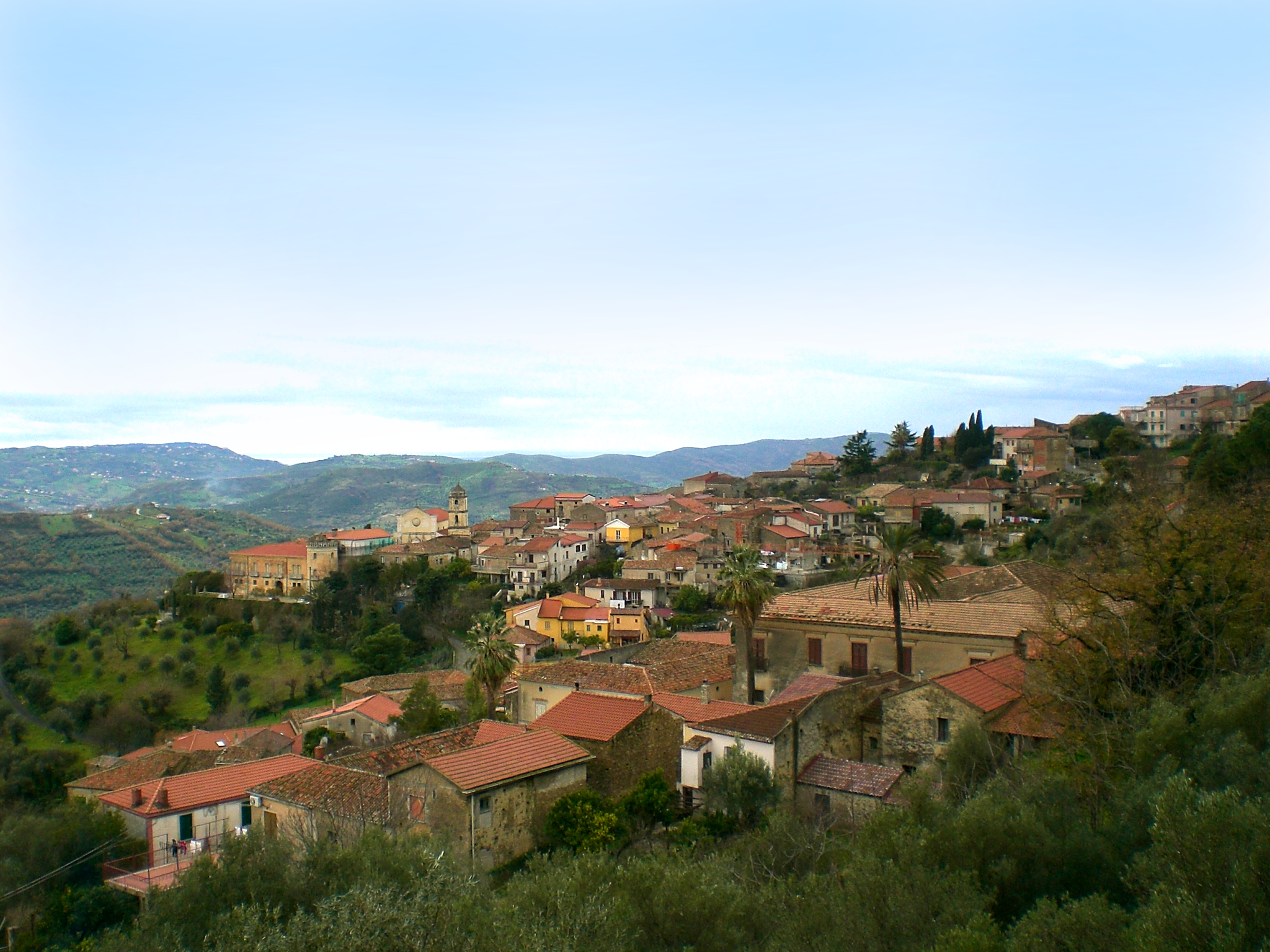

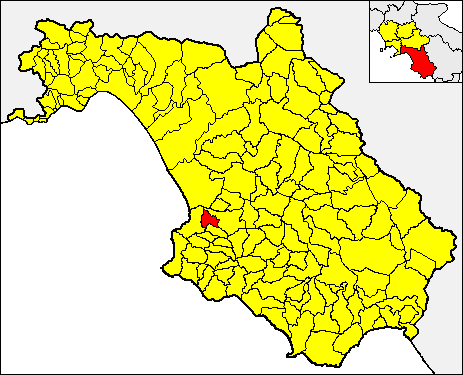
- Ogiastro Cilento within the Province of Salerno

- Location within Italy Location within Campania
- Coordinates: 40°21′5.04″N 15°2′36.46″E
- Country: Italy
- Region: Campania
- Province: Salerno (SA)
- Frazioni: Eredita, Finocchito

Government
  - Mayor: Paolo Astone

Area
  - Total: 13 km^{2} (5.0 sq mi)
- Elevation: 365 m (1,198 ft)

Population (2011)
  - Total: 2,241
  - Density: 170/km^{2} (450/sq mi)
- Demonym: Ogliastresi
- Time zone: UTC+1 (CET)
  - Summer (DST): UTC+2 (CEST)
- Postal code: 84061
- Dialing code: 0974
- ISTAT code: 065081
- Patron saint: Our Lady of Good Counsel
- Saint day: 26 April
- Website: Official website

Ogliastro Cilento is a town and comune in the province of Salerno in the Campania region of south-western Italy. As of 2011 its population was of 2,241.

== History ==
First mentioned in 1059 as Oleastrum (Latin word referred to the olive tree), the town was part of Agropoli, a fief of the bishop of Paestum, until 1556.

== Geography ==
=== Overview ===
Located in northern Cilento, few km from the Cilentan Coast and the Ancient Greek town of Paestum (11 km), Ogliastro Cilento is a hill town bordering with the municipalities of Agropoli, Cicerale, and Prignano Cilento. Crossed by the national road SS18 Naples-Reggio Calabria, it is 8 km far from Agropoli, 30 from Vallo della Lucania, 32 from Battipaglia, and 56 from Salerno.

=== Frazioni ===
The hamlets (frazioni) of Ogliastro the villages of Eredita and Finocchito. The municipality counts also the localities (composed of few scattered farmhouses) of Ginestre, Purgatorio, Santa Caterina, and Santa Maria della Grazia.

- Eredita (40.35742°N 15.04993°E) is the most populated hamlet, and is located close to Ogliastro, below a hill. It was first mentioned in 1103 as Heredita.
- Finocchito (40.35192°N 15.07395°E) is a small village located in the eastern side of the municipality, near the mountain road to Cicerale. Its population is of 82.

== See also ==
- Cilentan dialect
- Cilento and Vallo di Diano National Park
