= Laureana Cilento =

- Comune
- Comune di Laureana Cilento
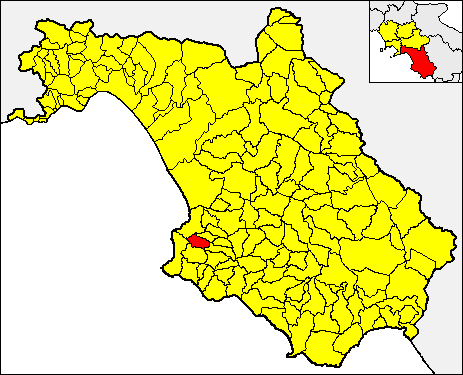
- Laureana Cilento within the Province of Salerno

- Location within Italy Location within Campania
- Coordinates: 40°18′N 15°2′E
- Country: Italy
- Region: Campania
- Province: Salerno (SA)
- Frazioni: Archi, Casaliello, Matonti, San Martino, San Cono, Spinelli, Vetrali

Government
  - Mayor: Angelo Serra

Area
  - Total: 13.74 km^{2} (5.31 sq mi)

Population (31 August 2017)
  - Total: 1,182
  - Density: 86.03/km^{2} (222.8/sq mi)
- Demonym: Lauranesi
- Time zone: UTC+1 (CET)
  - Summer (DST): UTC+2 (CEST)
- Postal code: 84050
- Dialing code: 0974
- ISTAT code: 065060
- Patron saint: San Cono
- Saint day: 3 June
- Website: Official website

Laureana Cilento is a town and comune in the province of Salerno in the Campania region of south-western Italy.

== Geography ==
Laureana borders with the municipalities of Agropoli, Castellabate, Lustra, Perdifumo and Torchiara. Its frazioni are the villages of Archi, Casaliello, Matonti, San Martino, San Cono, Spinelli and Vetrali.
