= San Marzano sul Sarno =

- Comune
- Comune di San Marzano sul Sarno
- Coat of arms

- Location within Italy Location within Campania
- Coordinates: 40°46′10.93″N 14°35′40.78″E
- Country: Italy
- Region: Campania
- Province: Salerno (SA)

Government
  - Mayor: Andrea Annunziata (Vivi San Marzano)

Area
  - Total: 5 km^{2} (1.9 sq mi)
- Elevation: 20 m (66 ft)

Population (31 December 2010)
  - Total: 10,205
  - Density: 2,000/km^{2} (5,300/sq mi)
- Demonym: Sammarzanesi
- Time zone: UTC+1 (CET)
  - Summer (DST): UTC+2 (CEST)
- Postal code: 84010
- Dialing code: 081
- Patron saint: San Biagio

San Marzano sul Sarno is a town and comune in the province of Salerno in the Campania region of southern Italy. It is situated about halfway between Autostrade A3 and A30.

== History ==
The territory of the Sarno valley presents the first traces of human presence between the 9th and 6th centuries BC, a period to which numerous necropolises date back with around 1,400 pit tombs, attributed to the Sarrastri population. Subsequently, the population declined in favor of the new centers of Nuceria Alfaterna, Pompeii and Stabia.

The first mention of San Marzano dates back to a letter from Pope Gregory I in 601, addressed to the abbot of the monastery of San Giorgio in Orvieto, which mentions a Benedictine monastery located in Fundo Marciano, destroyed by the Lombards. With the name of San Marzano the locality is mentioned in a deed of sale from 963 preserved in the Abbey of the Santissima Trinità in Cava de' Tirreni.

In 1220 San Marzano was granted by Federico II to the abbey of Montevergine, and shortly before 1234, it passed to Guidone II Filangieri and remained in the family until it was confiscated in 1269 from Riccardo II Filangieri, who had sided with Conradin of Swabia against Charles I of Anjou. Under Angevin rule the fiefdom was in the possession of several families.

It was an autonomous university with the name of "Terra di San Marzano", as cited in a deed of 1521.

In the 16th century the fiefdom was erected into a barony, in the possession of the Del Tufo family. At the beginning of the seventeenth century, it was a marquisate in the possession of the Mastrilli family and, together with the other communities of the valley, it was in dispute with Alfonso Piccolomini, count of Celano and feudal lord of Scafati, due to a dam on the Sarno river that he had built and which involved damage to local populations.

The title of marquis of San Marzano and the possession of the fiefdom were inherited from the Mastrilli to Gentile III Albertini around 1678, remaining in the possession of the family until the abolition of feudal rights in 1806. In 1808 San Marzano became a municipality of the Kingdom of the Two Sicilies. Starting from 1820, the construction of the new road connecting Sarno and the Naples-Salerno consular road (in the Quarto district, in the territory of Sant'Egidio del Monte Albino), which crossed the territory of San Marzano, favored the development of the locality.

With the transition to the Kingdom of Italy the municipality took its current name in 1862. In 1871 the construction of the new municipal building was started by the mayor Vincenzo Pisani, inaugurated in 1877.

In 1903 the archaeologist Ettore Pais conducted an excavation campaign in the San Marzano area, which brought to light materials from the 9th-8th century BC. In 1910 the mayor Paolo Samengo brought gas lighting to the town and in the following years electric light, the telephone and the first pipe for drinking water.

The town was damaged by bombings during the Second World War and in particular the bridge over the Sarno river.

== See also ==
- San Marzano tomato
