= San Valentino Torio =

- Comune
- Comune di San Valentino Torio
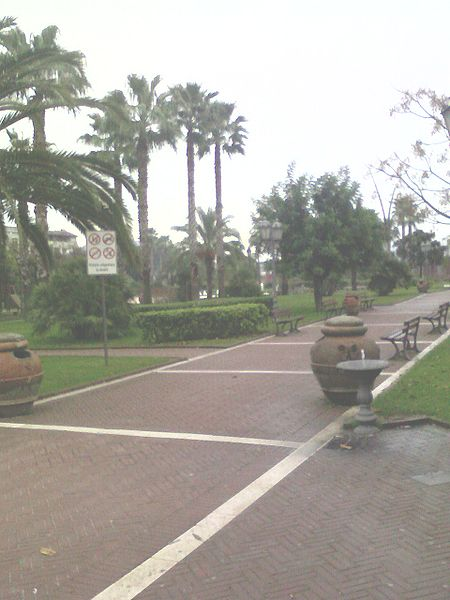

- Coat of arms

- Location within Italy Location within Campania
- Coordinates: 40°47′N 14°36′E
- Country: Italy
- Region: Campania
- Province: Salerno (SA)

Government
  - Mayor: Michele Strianese

Area
  - Total: 9 km^{2} (3.5 sq mi)
- Elevation: 22 m (72 ft)

Population (31 December 2010)
  - Total: 10,313
  - Density: 1,100/km^{2} (3,000/sq mi)
- Demonym: Valentinesi
- Time zone: UTC+1 (CET)
  - Summer (DST): UTC+2 (CEST)
- Postal code: 84010
- Dialing code: 081
- Patron saint: St. Valentine
- Saint day: 14 February

San Valentino Torio is a town and comune in the province of Salerno in the Campania region of south-west Italy. San Valentino Torio is situated in the northern part of the province, not far from Mount Vesuvius, in the Sarno River valley.

San Valentino Torio occupies a predominantly agricultural area with cultivation of the typical vegetables of the region, such as the San Marzano tomato.

== History ==
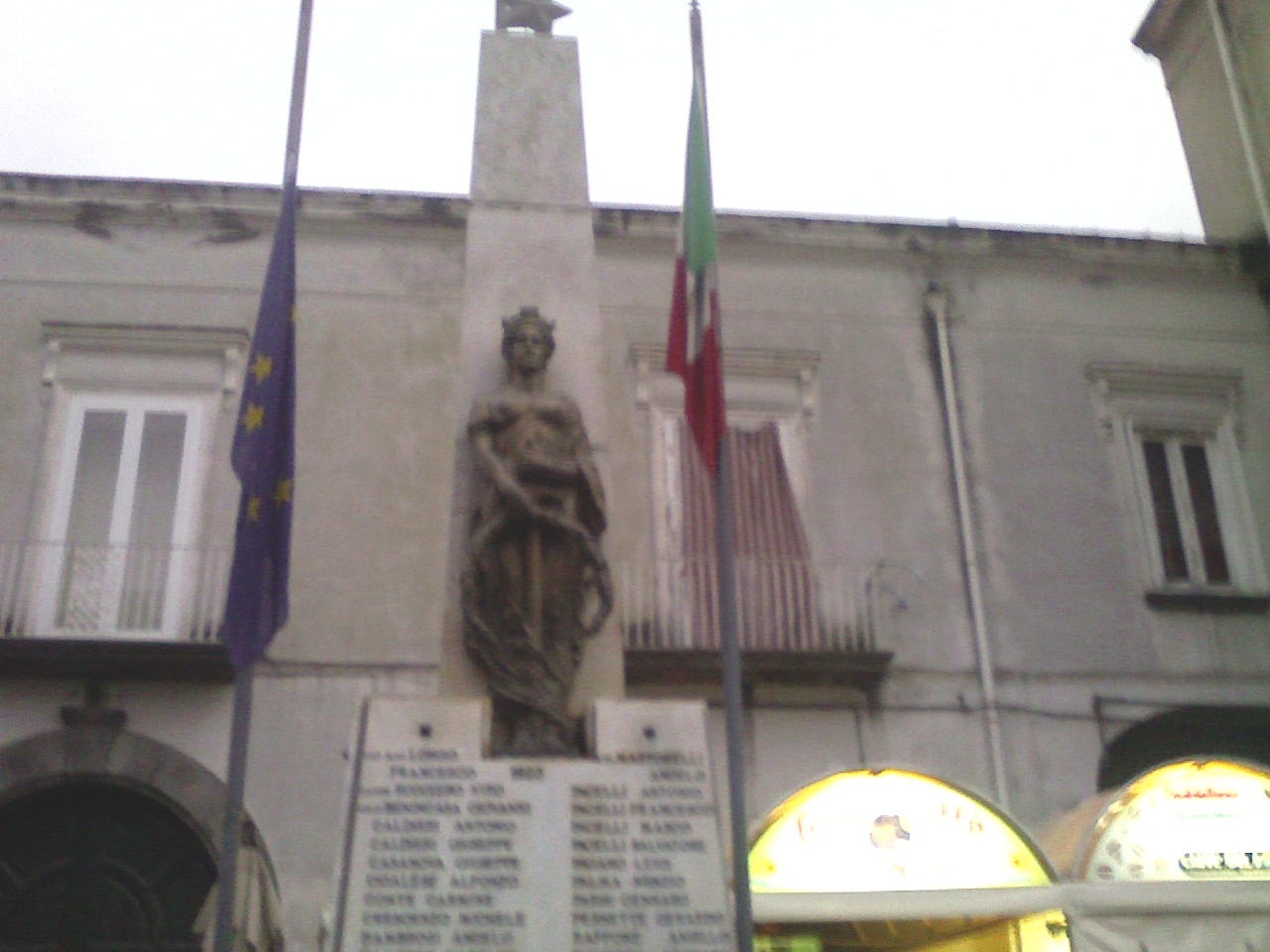
A monument to the Italian resistance movement in San Valentino Torio.

The first traces of human presence in the southern plain of Campania date from the ninth to the sixth centuries BCE. These include a necropolis with 1,400 tombs, attributed to the Sarrastri tribe. The Samnites invaded the territory in 421 BCE.

The earliest mention of San Valentino (as Balentino) is found in an 868 CE document, preserved in the Trinità della Cava abbey. Its territory was held by the Del Balzo and Capece Minutolo families until the abolition of feudalism in 1806. It assumed its current name after the unification of Italy, in 1861.
