= Prignano Cilento =

- Comune
- Comune di Prignano Cilento
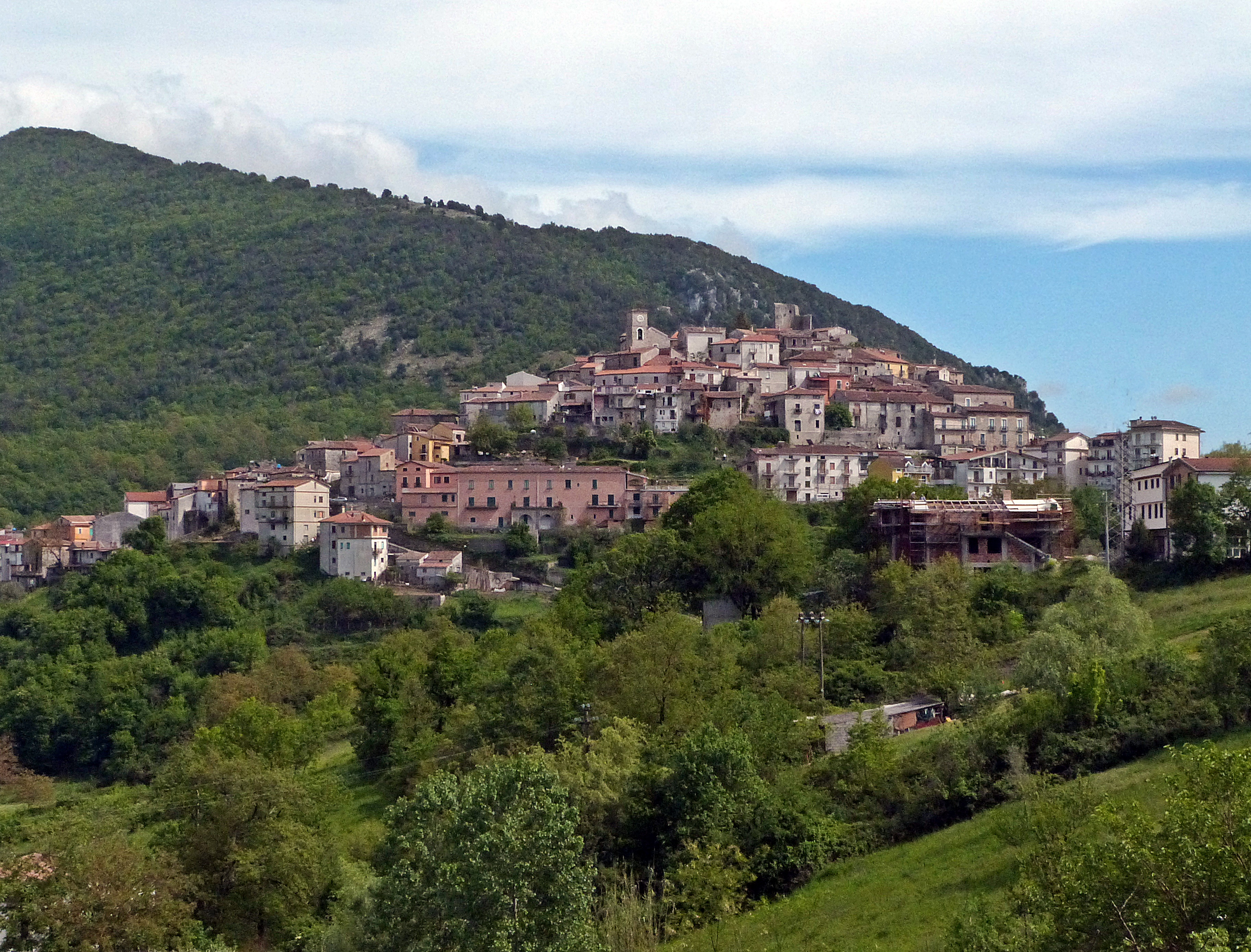

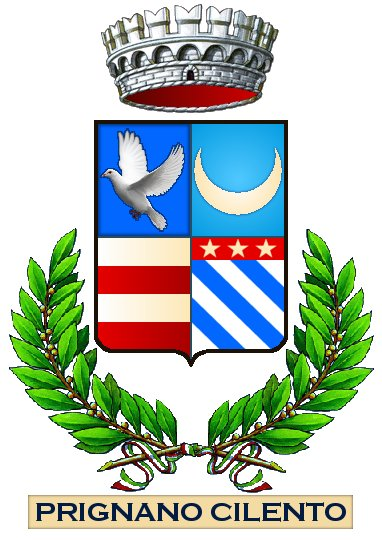
- Coat of arms

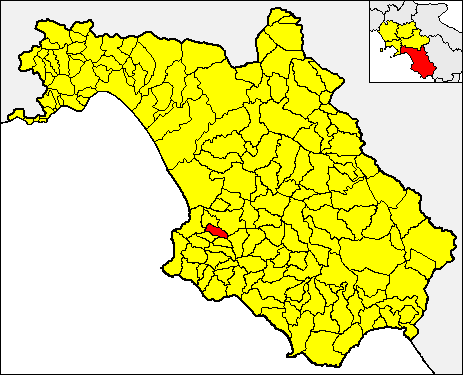
- Prignano Cilento within the Province of Salerno

- Location within Italy Location within Campania
- Coordinates: 40°20′N 15°04′E
- Country: Italy
- Region: Campania
- Province: Salerno (SA)
- Frazioni: Melito, San Giuliano

Government
  - Mayor: Giovanni Cantalupo

Area
  - Total: 11 km^{2} (4.2 sq mi)
- Elevation: 415 m (1,362 ft)

Population (2017)
  - Total: 1,035
  - Density: 94/km^{2} (240/sq mi)
- Demonym: Prignanesi
- Time zone: UTC+1 (CET)
  - Summer (DST): UTC+2 (CEST)
- Postal code: 84060
- Dialing code: 0974
- Patron saint: St. Nicholas of Bari
- Saint day: December 6
- Website: Official website

Prignano Cilento is a town and comune in the province of Salerno in the Campania region of south-western Italy. As of 2017 its population was 1,035.

== Geography ==
=== Location ===
Prignano is located in northern Cilento and borders the municipalities of Agropoli (10 km west), Cicerale, Ogliastro Cilento (4 km north), Perito, Rutino and Torchiara. In the eastern edge of its territory are the Alento River dam and reservoir, shared with Perito and Cicerale municipal territories.

=== Frazioni ===
It counts the hamlets of (frazioni) Melito and San Giuliano; and the rural localities of Acquabona, Alento, Selva and Serre. Until the end of the 16th century, there was another hamlet named Poglisi (or Puglisi).

- Melito lies under the hill where Prignano (1 km away) is located. It is a rural medieval village and its main sights are the Tower Volpe, the Old Fountain and St. Catherine's Chapel.
- San Giuliano is urbanistically contiguous to Prignano and is nowadays considered a quarter of it. Anciently known as Taverna, it was a post house, and its main sight is St. Julian's Chapel.

== Main sights ==
Notable churches in the town are San Nicola di Bari, Santa Caterina, San Cosmo e Damiano, Sant'Antonio and San Biagio (originally the church of San Giuliano). There are four private antique chapels in the town. There was an Italo-Greek monastery, Santa Sofia, in the locality of Serre.

== Transport ==
The town is crossed in the middle by the state highway SS18, and is served by the SS18 Var highway, linking Salerno to Sapri (via Battipaglia, Agropoli and Vallo della Lucania), at the homonym exit. Nearest railway stations are Torchiara and Agropoli-Castellabate, both on the Southern Tyrrhenian railway.

== See also ==
- Cilentan dialect
- Cilento and Vallo di Diano National Park
