= Perdifumo =

- Comune
- Comune di Perdifumo
- Coat of arms

- Location within Italy Location within Campania
- Coordinates: 40°15′N 15°1′E
- Country: Italy
- Region: Campania
- Province: Salerno (SA)
- Frazioni: Camella, Giungatelle, Mercato Cilento, Vatolla

Government
  - Mayor: Vincenzo Paolillo (Lista Civica)

Area
  - Total: 23.81 km^{2} (9.19 sq mi)

Population (31 March 2018)
  - Total: 1,776
  - Density: 74.59/km^{2} (193.2/sq mi)
- Demonym: Perdifumesi
- Time zone: UTC+1 (CET)
  - Summer (DST): UTC+2 (CEST)
- Postal code: 84060
- Dialing code: 0974
- Patron saint: St. James
- Saint day: 25 July
- Website: Official website

Perdifumo (Campanian: Pierdifume) is a town and comune in the province of Salerno in the Campania region of south-western Italy.
