= Province of Salerno =

Province of Salerno Provincia di Salerno (Italian) Pruvincia 'e Salierno (Neapolitan)
- Province
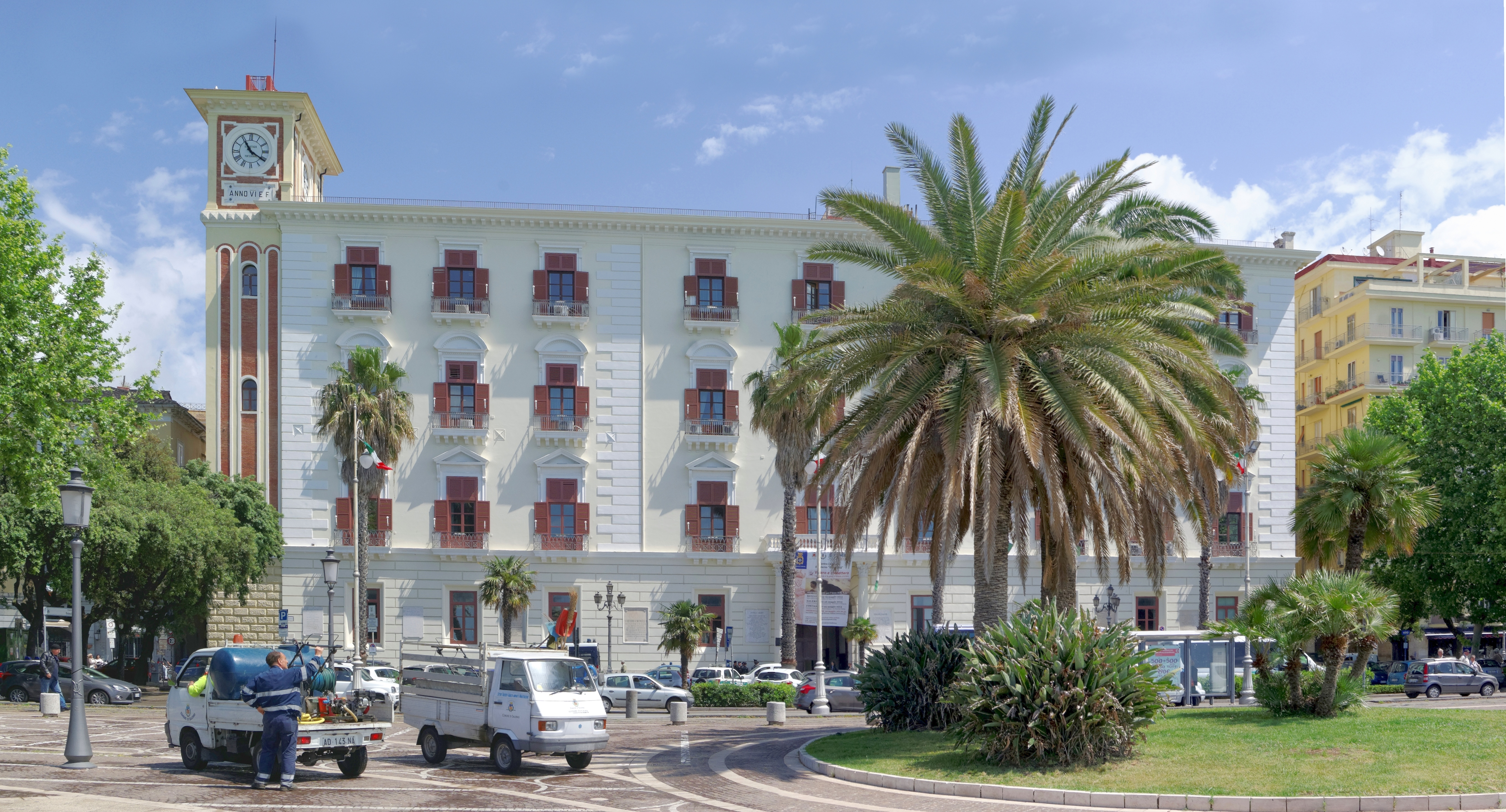
- Palazzo Sant'Agostino, the provincial seat

- Flag Coat of arms

- Location of the province of Salerno in Italy
- Coordinates: 40°41′N 14°46′E
- Country: Italy
- Region: Campania
- Capital(s): Salerno
- Municipalities: 158

Government
  - President: Giuseppe Parente (PD)

Area
  - Total: 4,954.16 km^{2} (1,912.81 sq mi)

Population (2026)
  - Total: 1,053,302
  - Density: 212.610/km^{2} (550.656/sq mi)

GDP
  - Total: €19.358 billion (2015)
  - Per capita: €17,479 (2015)
- Time zone: UTC+1 (CET)
  - Summer (DST): UTC+2 (CEST)
- Postal code: 84100
- Telephone prefix: 089
- ISO 3166 code: IT-SA
- Vehicle registration: SA
- ISTAT code: 065
- Website: www.provincia.salerno.it

The province of Salerno (Italian: provincia di Salerno, Neapolitan: Pruvincia 'e Salierno) is a province in the Campania region of Italy. It has a population of 1,053,302 in an area of 4,954.16 square kilometres (1,912.81 sq mi) across its 158 municipalities.

== Municipalities ==
The province has 158 municipalities:

- Acerno
- Agropoli
- Albanella
- Alfano
- Altavilla Silentina
- Amalfi
- Angri
- Aquara
- Ascea
- Atena Lucana
- Atrani
- Auletta
- Baronissi
- Battipaglia
- Bellizzi
- Bellosguardo
- Bracigliano
- Buccino
- Buonabitacolo
- Caggiano
- Calvanico
- Camerota
- Campagna
- Campora
- Cannalonga
- Capaccio
- Casal Velino
- Casalbuono
- Casaletto Spartano
- Caselle in Pittari
- Castel San Giorgio
- Castel San Lorenzo
- Castelcivita
- Castellabate
- Castelnuovo Cilento
- Castelnuovo di Conza
- Castiglione del Genovesi
- Cava de' Tirreni
- Celle di Bulgheria
- Centola
- Ceraso
- Cetara
- Cicerale
- Colliano
- Conca dei Marini
- Controne
- Contursi Terme
- Corbara
- Corleto Monforte
- Cuccaro Vetere
- Eboli
- Felitto
- Fisciano
- Furore
- Futani
- Giffoni Sei Casali
- Giffoni Valle Piana
- Gioi
- Giungano
- Ispani
- Laureana Cilento
- Laurino
- Laurito
- Laviano
- Lustra
- Magliano Vetere
- Maiori
- Mercato San Severino
- Minori
- Moio della Civitella
- Montano Antilia
- Monte San Giacomo
- Montecorice
- Montecorvino Pugliano
- Montecorvino Rovella
- Monteforte Cilento
- Montesano sulla Marcellana
- Morigerati
- Nocera Inferiore
- Nocera Superiore
- Novi Velia
- Ogliastro Cilento
- Olevano sul Tusciano
- Oliveto Citra
- Omignano
- Orria
- Ottati
- Padula
- Pagani
- Palomonte
- Pellezzano
- Perdifumo
- Perito
- Pertosa
- Petina
- Piaggine
- Pisciotta
- Polla
- Pollica
- Pontecagnano Faiano
- Positano
- Postiglione
- Praiano
- Prignano Cilento
- Ravello
- Ricigliano
- Roccadaspide
- Roccagloriosa
- Roccapiemonte
- Rofrano
- Romagnano al Monte
- Roscigno
- Rutino
- Sacco
- Sala Consilina
- Salento
- Salerno
- Salvitelle
- San Cipriano Picentino
- San Giovanni a Piro
- San Gregorio Magno
- San Mango Piemonte
- San Marzano sul Sarno
- San Mauro Cilento
- San Mauro La Bruca
- San Pietro al Tanagro
- San Rufo
- San Valentino Torio
- Sant'Angelo a Fasanella
- Sant'Arsenio
- Sant'Egidio del Monte Albino
- Santa Marina
- Santomenna
- Sanza
- Sapri
- Sarno
- Sassano
- Scafati
- Scala
- Serramezzana
- Serre
- Sessa Cilento
- Siano
- Sicignano degli Alburni
- Stella Cilento
- Stio
- Teggiano
- Torchiara
- Torraca
- Torre Orsaia
- Tortorella
- Tramonti
- Trentinara
- Valle dell'Angelo
- Vallo della Lucania
- Valva
- Vibonati
- Vietri sul Mare

== Demographics ==
As of 2026, the population is 1,053,302, of which 49.2% are male, and 50.8% are female. Minors make up 15.2% of the population, and seniors make up 23.8%.

Historical population

Year	Pop.	±%
1861	535,162	—
1871	553,276	+3.4%
1881	570,775	+3.2%
1901	581,491	+1.9%
1911	584,772	+0.6%
1921	613,895	+5.0%
1931	661,717	+7.8%
1936	705,277	+6.6%

Year	Pop.	±%
1951	836,828	+18.7%
1961	912,265	+9.0%
1971	957,452	+5.0%
1981	1,013,779	+5.9%
1991	1,066,601	+5.2%
2001	1,073,643	+0.7%
2011	1,092,876	+1.8%
2021	1,064,493	−2.6%

Source: ISTAT

=== Immigration ===
As of 2025, the foreign-born population is 74,727, making up 7.1% of the total population. The 5 largest foreign countries of origin are Morocco (11,327), Romania (10,091), Ukraine (8,219), Germany (5,995) and Venezuela (3,921).

== Sights ==
The Amalfi Coast—a UNESCO World Heritage Site since 1997—is located within the province, attracting tens of thousands of tourists from all around the world every year. The province also comprises the Cilento coast, whose sea quality is considered among the best in Italy.

Formerly a notable center of Magna Graecia, Paestum houses a wide complex of well-preserved ancient Greek temples.

One of the features of the rugged country-side is Gole del Calore di Felitto, an area of gorges between Felitto and Magliano Vetere formed by the Calore Lucano river. This area is of great geological interest and is rich in flora and fauna.

One of the many historical buildings in the province is the chapter house belonging to the Certosa di Padula (or Carthreuse of Padula or of San Lorenzo in Padula), a Carthusian monastery in the town of Padula. The building has evolved over centuries; the earliest parts were constructed in the early 14th century. A mannerist cloister leads to the church, and a later 17th-century cloister has loggias supported by rusticated columns. These features add to the general baroque character of the building.

The chapter house has been adapted for the Museo Archeologico della Lucania Occidentale, which has many ancient artifacts dating from Roman times.

The Monti Picentini area is home to the eponymous regional park, which is home to several natural preserves.
