= Agropoli =

- Comune
- Comune di Agropoli
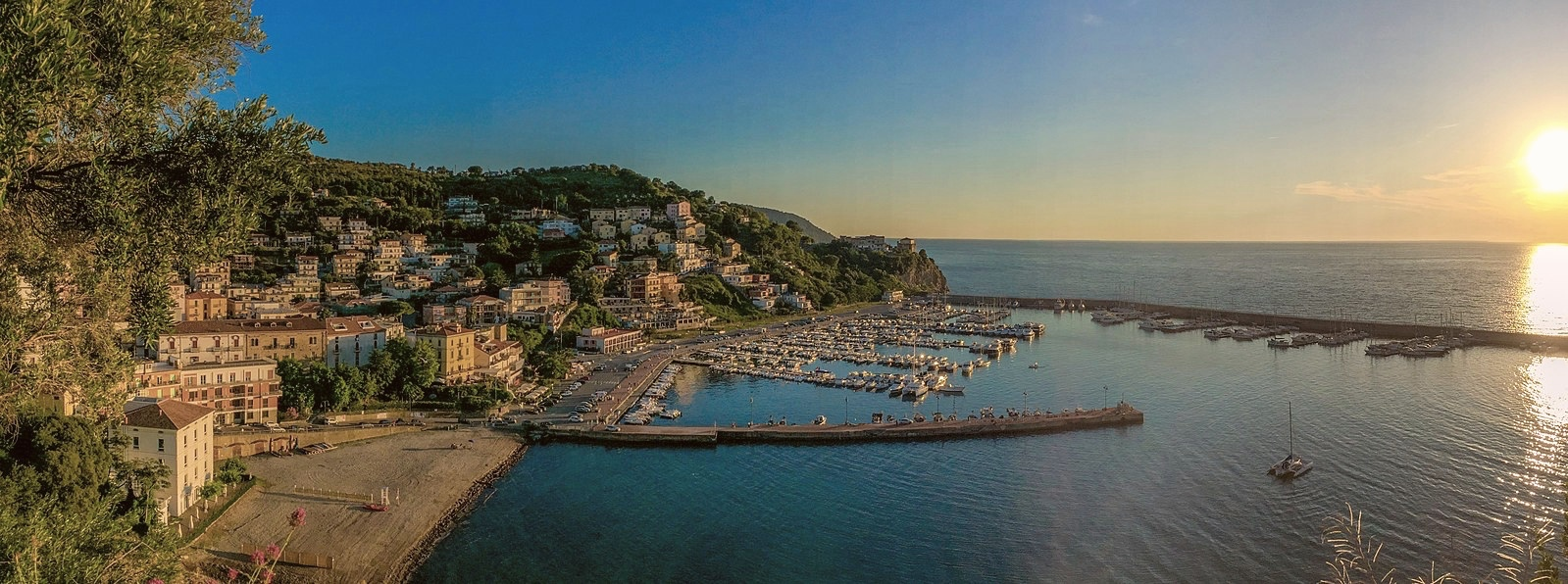
- Panoramic view

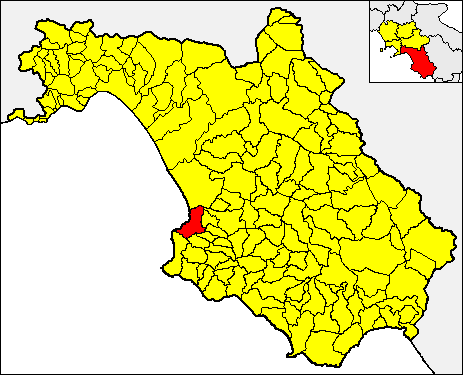
- Agropoli within the Province of Salerno

- Location within Italy Location within Campania
- Coordinates: 40°21′N 14°59′E
- Country: Italy
- Region: Campania
- Province: Salerno (SA)
- Frazioni: Frascinelle, Fuonti, Marotta, Mattine, Moio, Muoio, Madonna del Carmine, San Marco, Tarullo, Trentova

Government
  - Mayor: Roberto Mutalipassi

Area
  - Total: 32.77 km^{2} (12.65 sq mi)
- Elevation: 24 m (79 ft)

Population (30 April 2017)
  - Total: 21,838
  - Density: 666.4/km^{2} (1,726/sq mi)
- Demonym: Agropolesi
- Time zone: UTC+1 (CET)
  - Summer (DST): UTC+2 (CEST)
- Postal code: 84043
- Dialing code: 0974
- ISTAT code: 065002
- Patron saint: Sts. Peter and Paul
- Saint day: June 29
- Website: Official website

Agropoli is a town and comune located in the Cilento area of the province of Salerno, Campania, Italy. It is situated at the start of the Cilentan Coast, on the Tyrrhenian Sea.

== History ==
=== Pre-medieval period ===
The promontory on which Agropoli stands has been inhabited since Neolithic times. It seems, however, that it was not until the later Bronze and Iron Ages that it came to be continuously inhabited by a stable, indigenous population, which lived off hunting and fishing.

To the east of the promontory, at the mouth of the River Testene, there is a natural sheltered bay, called "Foce" in ancient times, but which is now almost completely silted up. Before and after the foundation of nearby Poseidonia (c. 625 BC), the Greeks used it for trading with the local people. They gave the promontory the Greek name, Petra ("rocky hill"), and built a temple on it, dedicated to Artemis, the Goddess of Hunting.

It has been established that in Roman times, on the coastal stretch, now known as San Marco, east of the promontory, and to the right of the Testene, a seaside town called "Ercula" developed and flourished between the 1st century BCE, and the 5th century CE. Meanwhile, the harbour of neighbouring Poseidonia (by then, renamed Paestum by the Romans) became progressively silted up by the process of coastal bradyseism.

=== Medieval period ===
During the 5th century, when the Vandals made life difficult in Ercula, its inhabitants retreated to the overlooking promontory, which offered better prospects for defence. Then, in the 6th century, during the Greco-Gothic war (535-553), the Byzantines needed a secure, well-protected harbour, south of Salerno, so they fortified it, and called it Acropolis, meaning 'high town' or citadel. Acropolis remained in the hands of the Byzantines until 882, when the town fell to the Saracens, who turned it into a formidable stronghold (Arabic: rabat). From this base, they set out to plunder and terrorise the surrounding areas, right up to the walls of Salerno. Eventually, in 915, they were driven out from their trenched camp at Garigliano. Acropolis was also liberated, and came back under the jurisdiction of the bishops, who had established their see in (old) Capaccio during this period.

For the rest of the medieval period, the area remained under the protection of the bishops, who also possessed huge territories, including the inhabited areas of Eredita and Ogliastro, as well as the former villages of Lucolo, Mandrolle, Pastina, San Marco in Agropoli and San Pietro in Eredita. This vast area constituted the feudal district of Agropoli which had been ceded to the bishops of Capaccio in Norman times and, except for brief periods, was possessed by them until the early decades of the 15th century. In fact, in 1412, Pope Gregory XII ceded the feudal territories of Agropoli and Castellabate to King Ladislas of Durazzo (1386–1414) in partial payment of some war debts. However, the Crown did not formally take possession until 1443, and before this, on 20 July 1436, King Alfonso V of Naples granted the fiefs of Agropoli and Castellabate to Giovanni Sanseverino, Count of Marsico and Baron of Cilento, requiring him to pay the Bishop of Capaccio 12 ounces of gold annually.

=== Modern period ===
The first statistics on Agropoli were compiled in 1445, when the town, including its dependent villages, had a total of 202 homes and, therefore, a similar number of families. Apart from a few changes, such as the temporary transfer to Rodrigo d'Avalos, Marquis of Vasto, from 1505 to 1507, Agropoli and its feudal lands were held by the Sanseverino family until 1552, when Prince Ferrante was accused of treason, and forced to give up all his possessions. After that, Agropoli passed to various families in succession:

- D'Ayerbo of Aragon (1553)
- Grimaldi (after 1564)
- Arcella Caracciolo (1597)
- Mendoza (1607)
- the Filomarino princes of Roccadaspide (1626)
- Mastrillo (1650)
- Zattara
- the Sanfelice, Dukes of Laureana (1660), who possessed the town until the abolition of feudalism in 1806.

Agropoli was a particular target of raids from North Africa in the 16th and 17th centuries, and the population dwindled to only a few hundred inhabitants. On 21 April 1544, the town was sacked, and about 100 people were taken prisoner. On 30 June 1630, a strong band of men from the surrounding Cilento helped the citizens of Agropoli to repel an attack by 700 Turkish pirates. The pirates managed to escape in their ships with a substantial amount of booty and many prisoners, but were nevertheless heavily defeated, and left many dead behind them.

During the 19th century, Agropoli began to expand outside the medieval walls, but the old town has remained intact, together with most of the surrounding defensive walls, and the 7th-century entrance gate.

== Geography ==
The municipality borders with Capaccio, Castellabate, Cicerale, Laureana Cilento, Ogliastro Cilento, Prignano Cilento and Torchiara. The town is few kilometres far from the Ancient Greek city of Paestum.

It includes the hamlets (frazioni) of Frascinelle, Fuonti, Marotta, Mattine, Moio, Muoio, Madonna del Carmine, San Marco, Tarullo and Trentova.

== Main sights ==
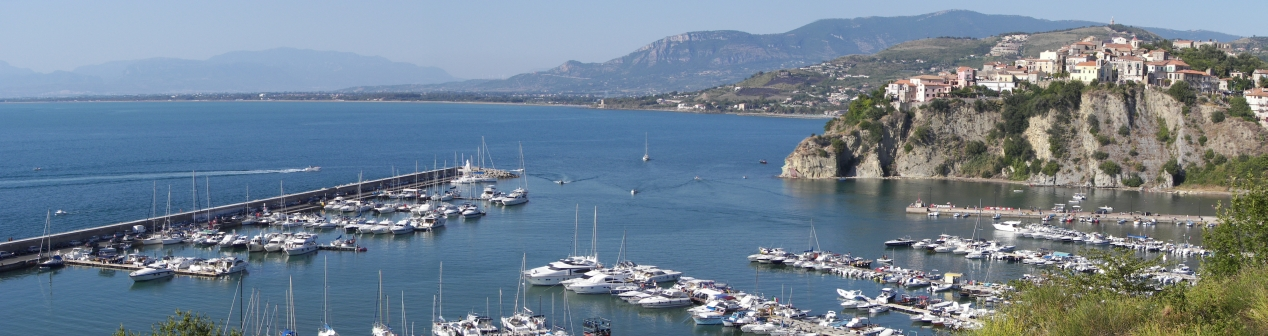
Agropoli's port.

The town, where some tombs predating the Byzantine period were recently found, also houses the medieval ruins of San Francesco's monastery, and the Churches of the Holy Mary of Constantinople (16th century), San Marco, and San Francesco. The beaches of Trentova Bay contribute to make Agropoli an important seaside resort.

The Angevin-Aragonese castle, which was built on the 6th century Byzantine foundations, still stands on top of the promontory. It has a triangular plan with three circular towers and a moat. To the west of the modern tourist harbour is another small promontory, on which the coastal tower of San Francesco (16th century) stands next to the much altered remains of the convent of the same name.

In the Municipal Antiquarian, there is a sizeable collection of archaeological finds, representing life in the area from prehistoric to medieval times.

== Transportation ==
Agropoli has a train station on the Salerno–Reggio di Calabria railway. Road connection is guaranteed by the State highway SS18, which joins with the A2 Motorway at Battipaglia.

Agropoli has also a large tourist port, connected by ferries to Capri, Ischia, Salerno and Naples.

== Sports ==
U.S. Agropoli 1921 is the association football club representing the town, and its colors are white and light blue. In the season 2011-12 the team was promoted for the first time from 1990s, from Eccellenza Campania/B to Serie D.

One of the companies of Athletic is the ASD Agropoli Running, founded on October 26, 2011.

== Titular see ==
Agropoli is a titular see of the Catholic Church. It has been the title of:

- Zenon Grocholewski (21 December 1982 – 21 February 2001)
- Marc Ouellet (3 March 2001 – 15 November 2002)
- Pedro López Quintana (6 January 2003 – present)

Note: Pope Paul VI named John Paul Elford titular bishop of Agropoli in 1968, but Elford declined the appointment.

== Gallery ==
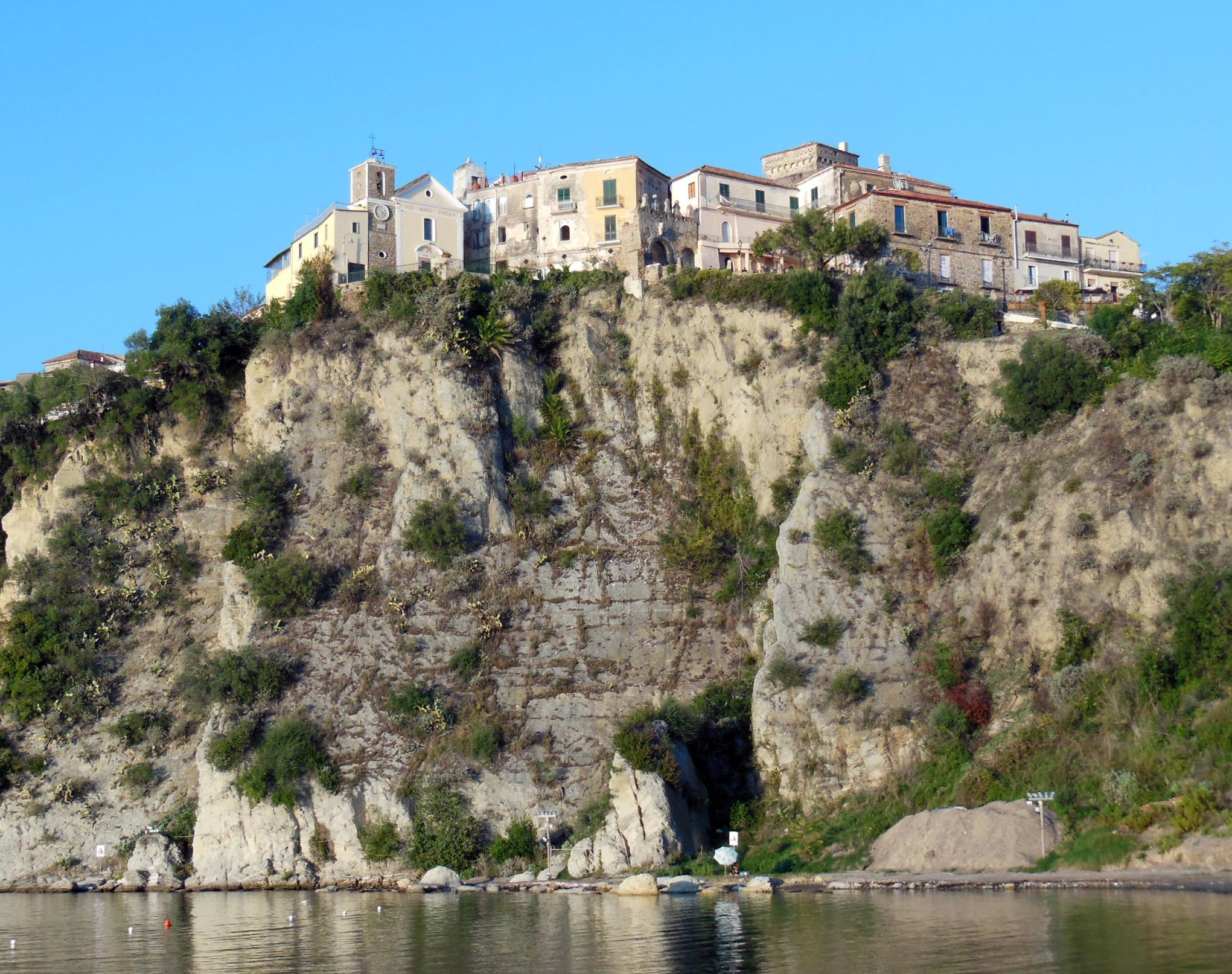
Old town seen from the coast

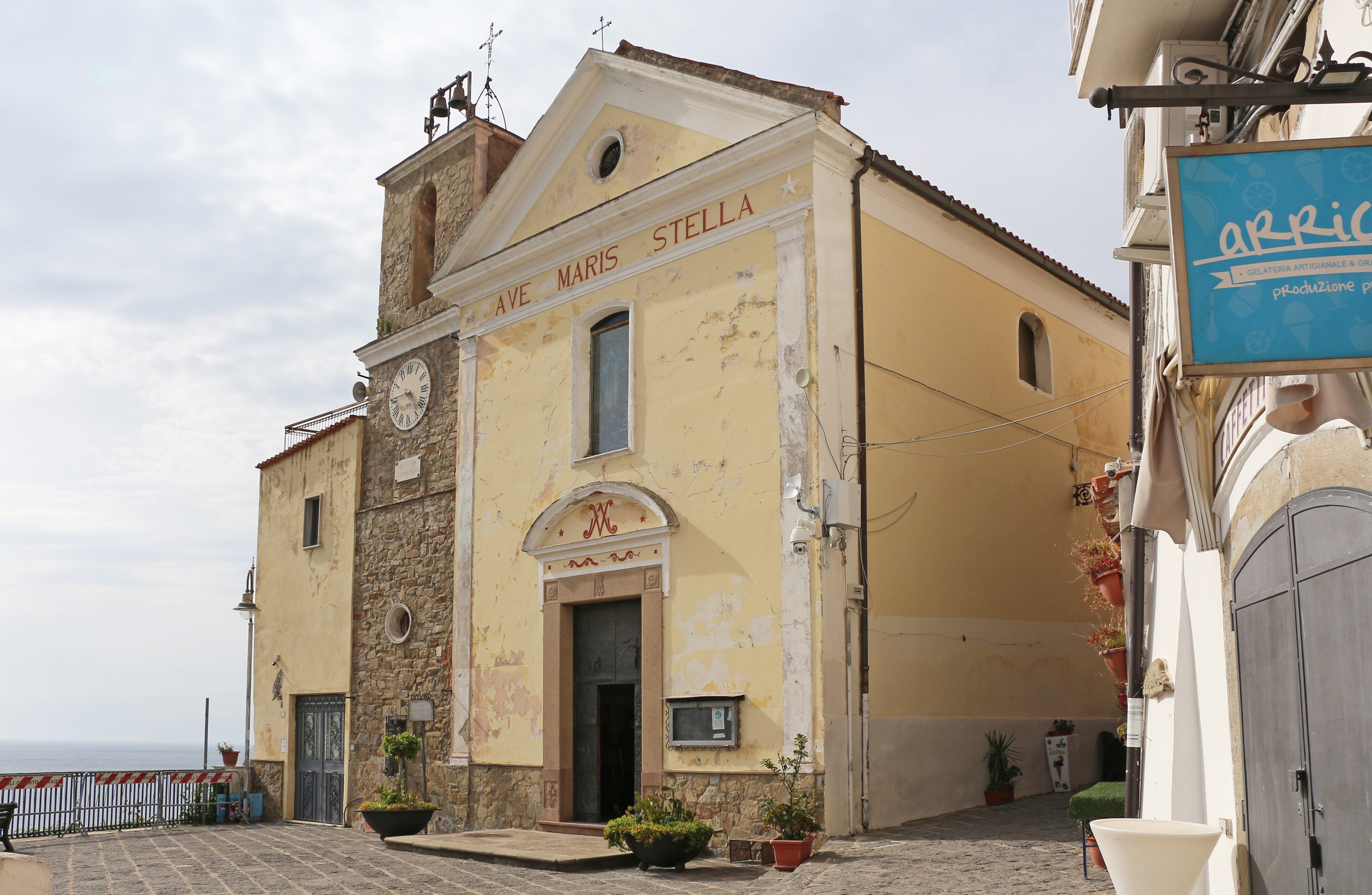
Our Lady of Constantinople Church

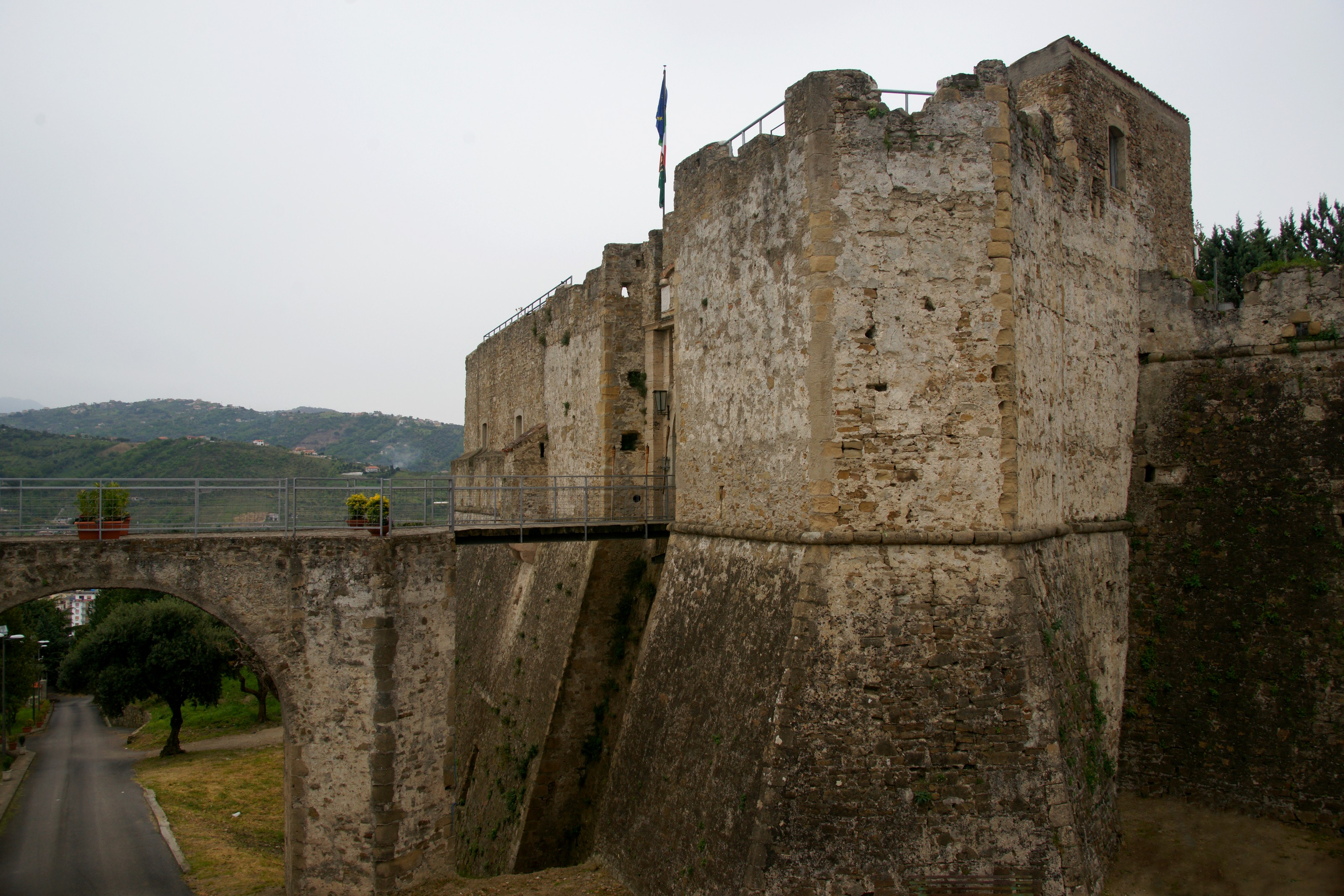
Aragonese Castle

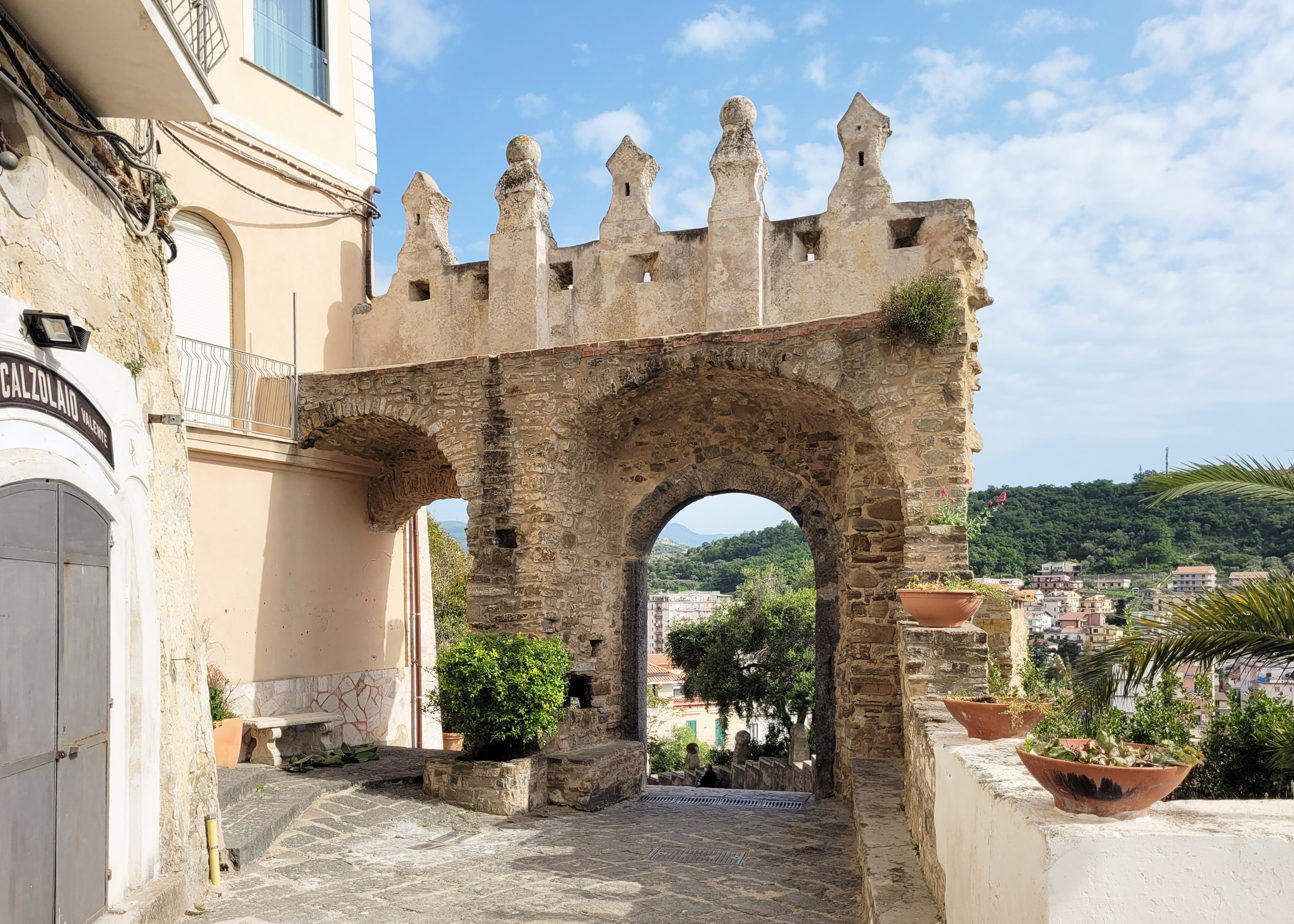
Porta Bizantina

== Twin towns ==
- Chili, New York, United States

== See also ==
- Cilentan dialect
- Cilentan Coast
- Cilento and Vallo di Diano National Park
