= Palomonte =

- Comune
- Comune di Palomonte
- Location within Italy Location within Campania
- Coordinates: 40°40′N 15°18′E
- Country: Italy
- Region: Campania
- Province: Salerno (SA)
- Frazioni: Bivio, Perrazze, Valle

Area
  - Total: 28 km^{2} (11 sq mi)
- Elevation: 550 m (1,800 ft)

Population (1 April 2009)
  - Total: 4,133
  - Density: 150/km^{2} (380/sq mi)
- Demonym: Palomontesi
- Time zone: UTC+1 (CET)
  - Summer (DST): UTC+2 (CEST)
- Postal code: 84020
- Dialing code: 0828
- ISTAT code: 065089
- Patron saint: San Biagio
- Saint day: 3 February
- Website: Official website

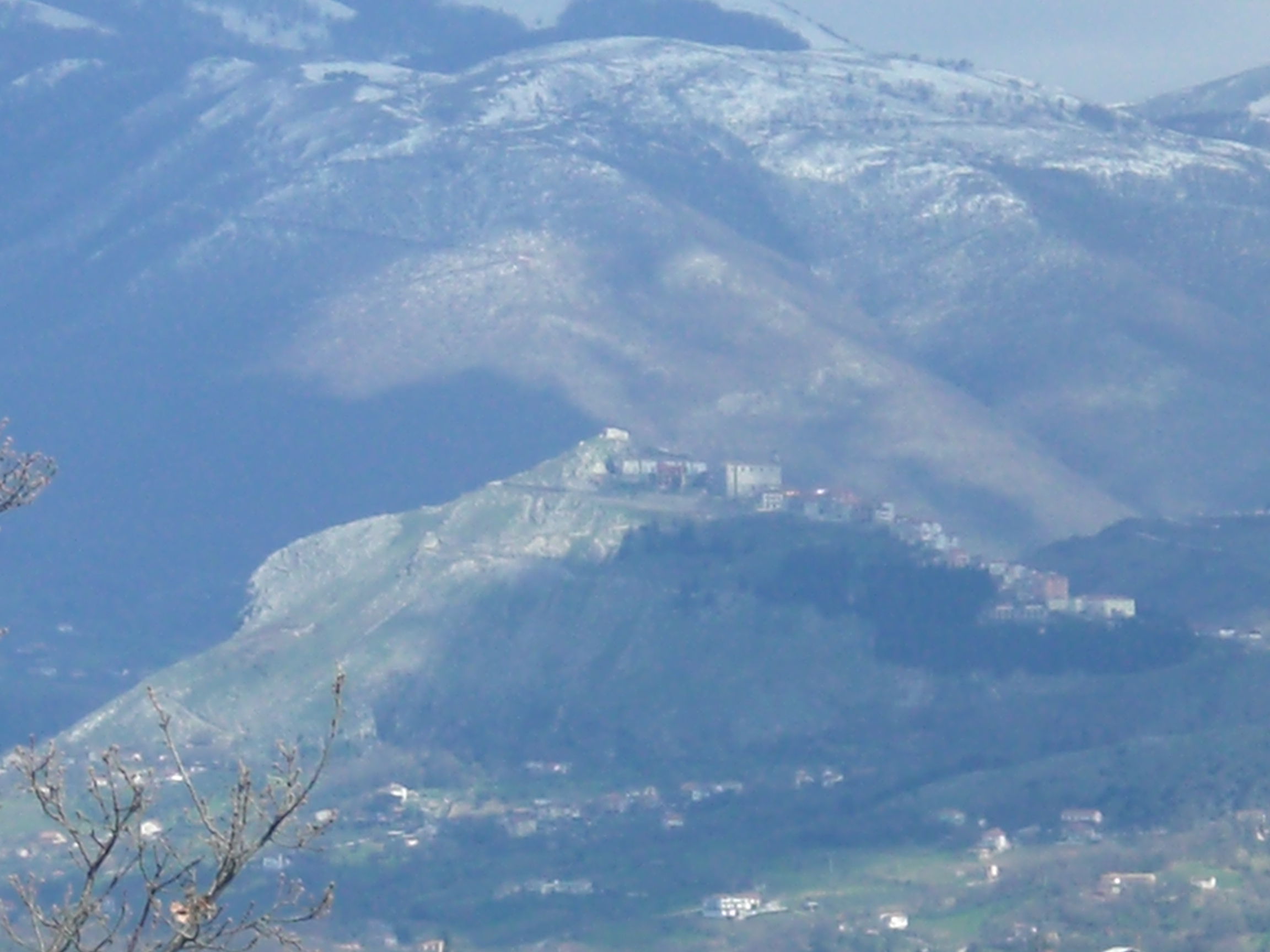
Panorama of Palomonte

Palomonte (Campanian: Pale or Palumonde) is a town and comune in the province of Salerno in the Campania region of south-western Italy. Palomonte's population is of 4.133 as of 2009.
