= San Gregorio Magno =

- Comune
- Comune di San Gregorio Magno
- Coat of arms

- Location within Italy Location within Campania
- Coordinates: 40°39′N 15°24′E
- Country: Italy
- Region: Campania
- Province: Salerno (SA)

Government
  - Mayor: Nicola padula

Area
  - Total: 49 km^{2} (19 sq mi)
- Elevation: 475 m (1,558 ft)

Population (31 December 2014)
  - Total: 4,327
  - Density: 88/km^{2} (230/sq mi)
- Demonym(s): Gregoriani, Sangruis (local dialect)
- Time zone: UTC+1 (CET)
  - Summer (DST): UTC+2 (CEST)
- Postal code: 84020
- Dialing code: 0828
- Patron saint: Pope Gregory I
- Saint day: 3 September
- Website: Official website

San Gregorio Magno (local dialect: San Grgorij) is a town and comune in the province of Salerno in the Campania region of southern Italy.

== Overview ==
San Gregorio Magno is located in an ethnographic region of Southern Italy with a unique form of folk music played on a specialized bagpipe called a Zampogna. The instrument is closely associated with the pastoral culture of the region and is played for secular purposes, such as the tarantella folk dance, as well as for religious devotion. San Gregorio Magno was recently featured in an independent documentary about this musical tradition entitled Zampogna: The Soul of Southern Italy.

== Twin towns ==
- Collegno, Italy
- Grugliasco, Italy
