= Romagnano al Monte =

Romagnano Al Monte
- Comune
- Comune di Romagnano al Monte
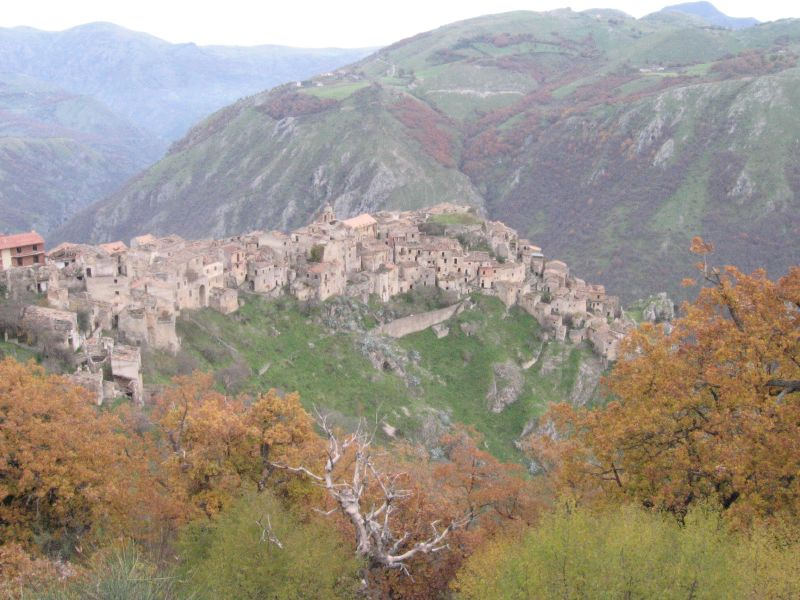
- The abandoned old town

- Location within Italy Location within Campania
- Coordinates: 40°37′N 15°27′E
- Country: Italy
- Region: Campania
- Province: Salerno (SA)

Government
  - Mayor: Giuliana Colucci

Area
  - Total: 9 km^{2} (3.5 sq mi)
- Elevation: 650 m (2,130 ft)

Population (28 February 2015)
  - Total: 415
  - Density: 46/km^{2} (120/sq mi)
- Demonym: Romagnanesi
- Time zone: UTC+1 (CET)
  - Summer (DST): UTC+2 (CEST)
- Postal code: 84020
- Dialing code: 0828
- Website: Official website

Romagnano al Monte is a village and comune of the province of Salerno in the Campania region of southern Italy.

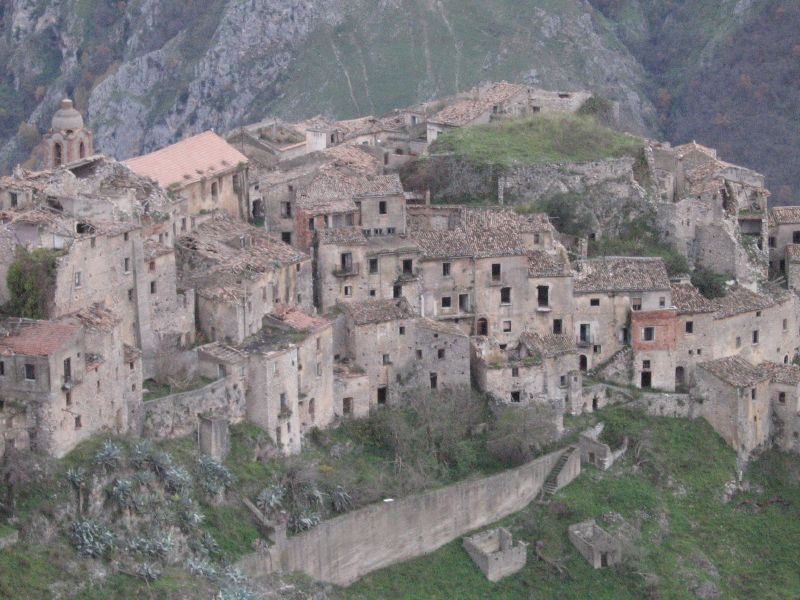
View of the old town.

== History ==
The village was destroyed in the Irpinia earthquake of 1980 and rebuilt a few kilometers away. The ghost town became a tourist attraction in the early 2000s like another village in the province: Roscigno Vecchia. The current baron of the small town is Francesco Torella di Romagnano who now resides in England.

== Geography ==
Romagnano is situated in the northern side of the cilentan geographical region, at the borders of Campania with Basilicata. The new town lies in the localities of Ariola (mainly) and Palazzo.
