= Casalsottano =

- Frazione
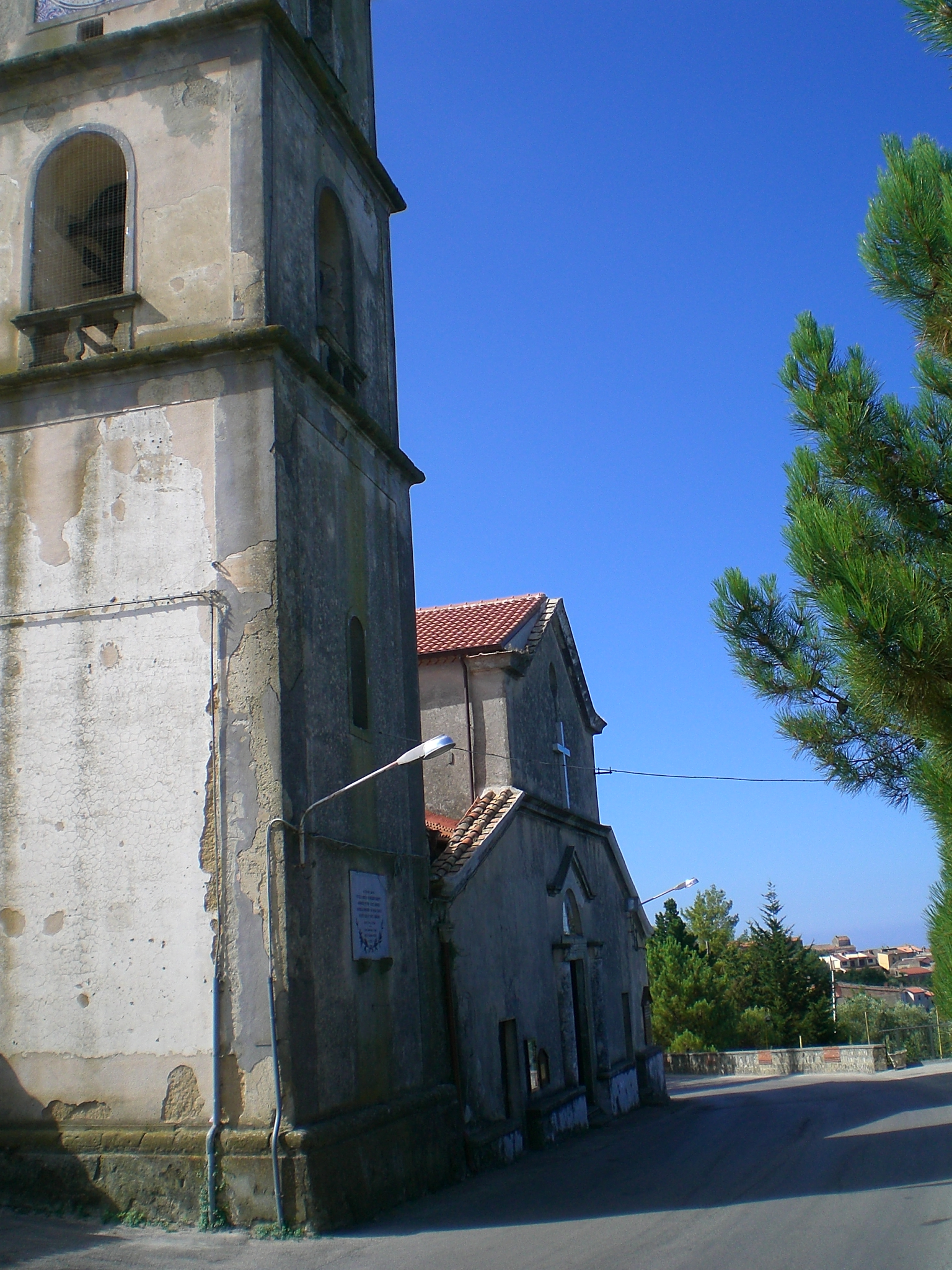
- St. Maurus church

- Location of Casalsottano in Italy
- Coordinates: 40°12′59.72″N 15°2′13.74″E
- Country: Italy
- Region: Campania
- Province: Salerno (SA)
- Comune: San Mauro Cilento
- Elevation: 465 m (1,526 ft)

Population (2011)
  - Total: 397
- Demonym: Casalesi
- Time zone: UTC+1 (CET)
  - Summer (DST): UTC+2 (CEST)
- Postal code: 84070
- Dialing code: (+39) 0974
- Patron saint: Saint Maurus

Casalsottano, also spelled Casal Sottano, is a southern Italian village and hamlet (frazione) of San Mauro Cilento, a municipality in the Province of Salerno, Campania. In 2011 it had a population of 397.

== History ==
The village was formed in the beginnings of the 14th century, when the residents of nearby settlements who survived the looting during the War of the Sicilian Vespers (1282–1302), took refuge around the church of St. Maurus and created a new village. Its toponym, meaning Lower Farmhouse, is closely related to one of the nearby and upper towns of San Mauro Cilento, also named Casalsoprano (i.e. Upper Farmhouse).

== Geography ==
Casalsottano lies above a hill, between San Mauro Cilento (2 km north) and Mezzatorre (6.6 km south), the other municipal hamlet, by the Cilentan Coast. A ravine separates it from the village of Galdo, 5 km east.

The village, part of the Cilento and Vallo di Diano National Park, is 8 km from Serramezzana, 9 from Pollica, 10.2 from Acciaroli, 10.6 from Agnone Cilento, 26 from Agropoli and 74 from Salerno.

== Main sights ==
The medieval parish church of Saint Maurus is one of the most prominent buildings of the village and the oldest one.

== See also ==
- Cilentan dialect
- Mount Stella
