= Marina di Casalvelino =

- Frazione
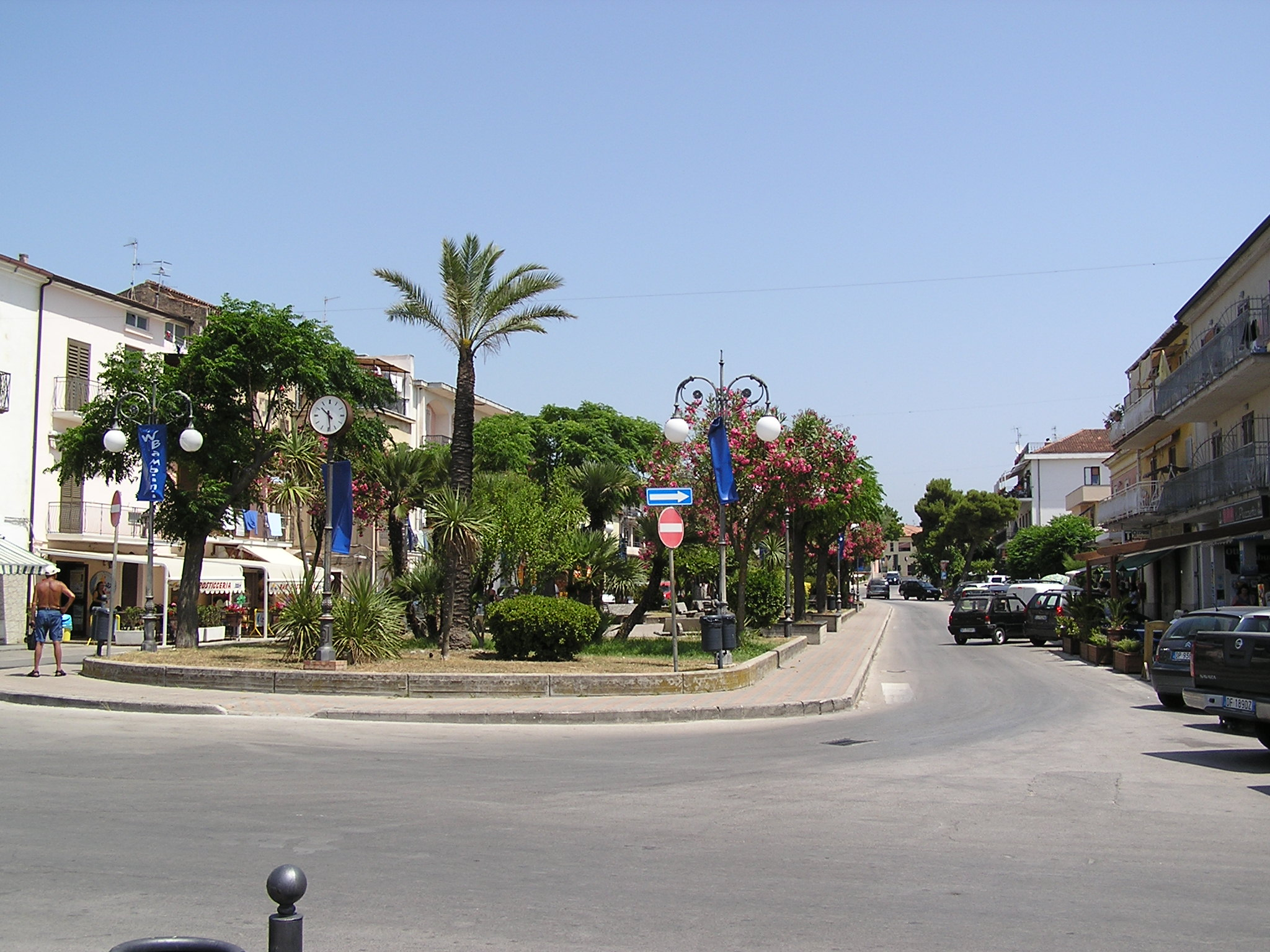
- A square in town's centre

- Location of Marina di Casalvelino in Italy
- Coordinates: 40°10′40.0″N 15°07′25.9″E
- Country: Italy
- Region: Campania
- Province: Salerno (SA)
- Comune: Casal Velino
- Elevation: 10 m (33 ft)

Population (2009)
  - Total: 1,263
- Demonym: Marinesi
- Time zone: UTC+1 (CET)
  - Summer (DST): UTC+2 (CEST)
- Postal code: 84040
- Dialing code: (+39) 0974

Marina di Casalvelino, also spelled Casalvelino Marina, is a southern Italian village and hamlet (frazione) of Casal Velino, a municipality in the province of Salerno, Campania. With a population of 1,263 (2009), it is the most populated hamlet of its municipality.

== History ==
The village, located next to the ruins of the Ancient Greek city of Velia, grew in population and urban expansion in the last decade of the 20th century, thanks to the tourism in the Cilentan Coast.

== Geography ==
Marina di Casalvelino is a seaside village located by the Tyrrhenian Coast, in Cilento, and spans on a plain between the mouth of Alento river to the east, and the surrounding mountains to the west. It is 4 km from Casal Velino, Velia and Pioppi, 7 from Acquavella, 8 from Ascea and 20 from Vallo della Lucania.

== Transport ==
The port of Marina is served by the hydrofoil's line MM6W Naples-Sorrento-Marina di Camerota, part of a local passenger ferry network named Metrò del Mare. The village is also crossed by the national highway SS 267.

== Gallery ==
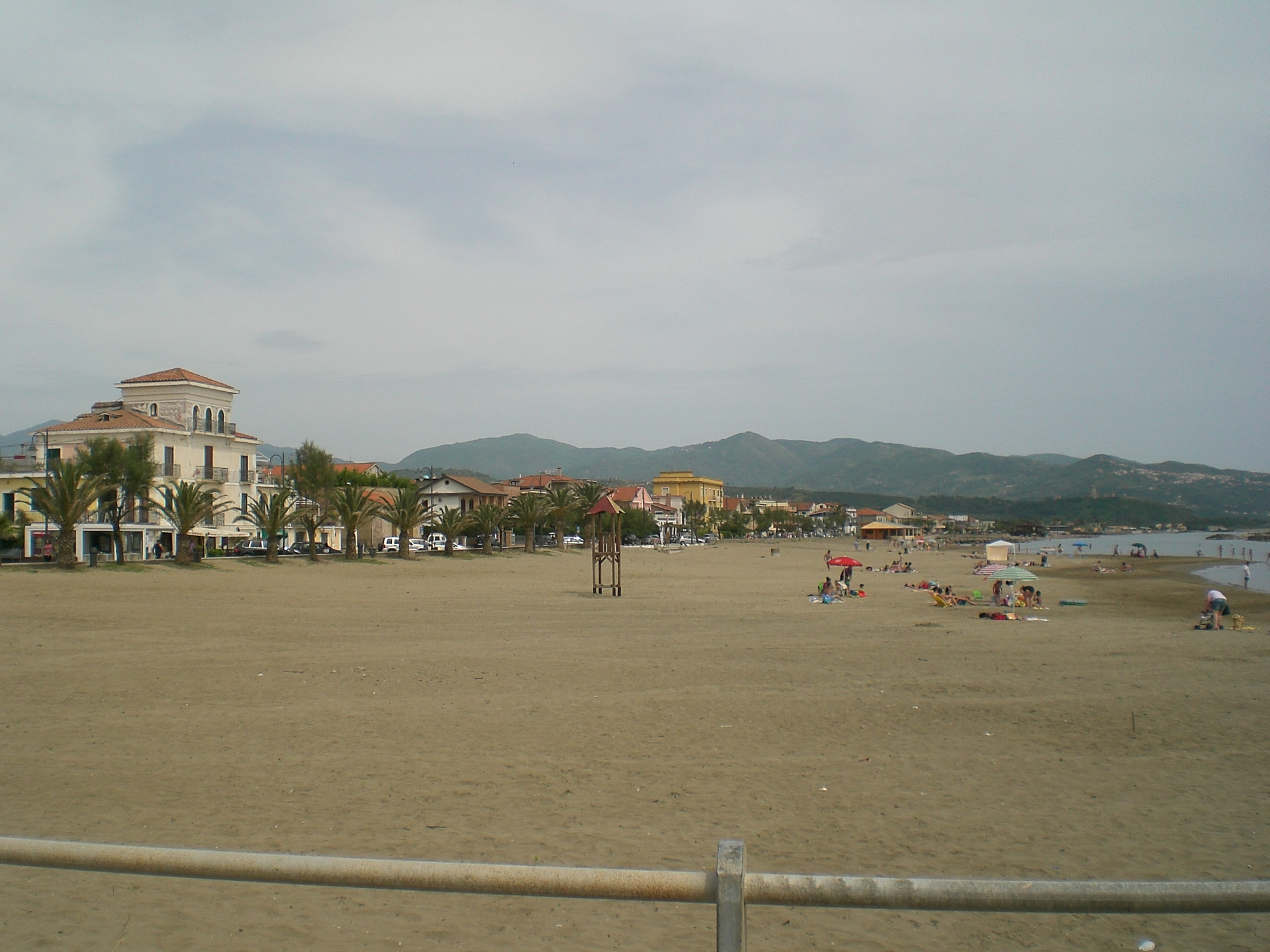
View of the beach of Marina di Casalvelino with the hills of Ascea in background

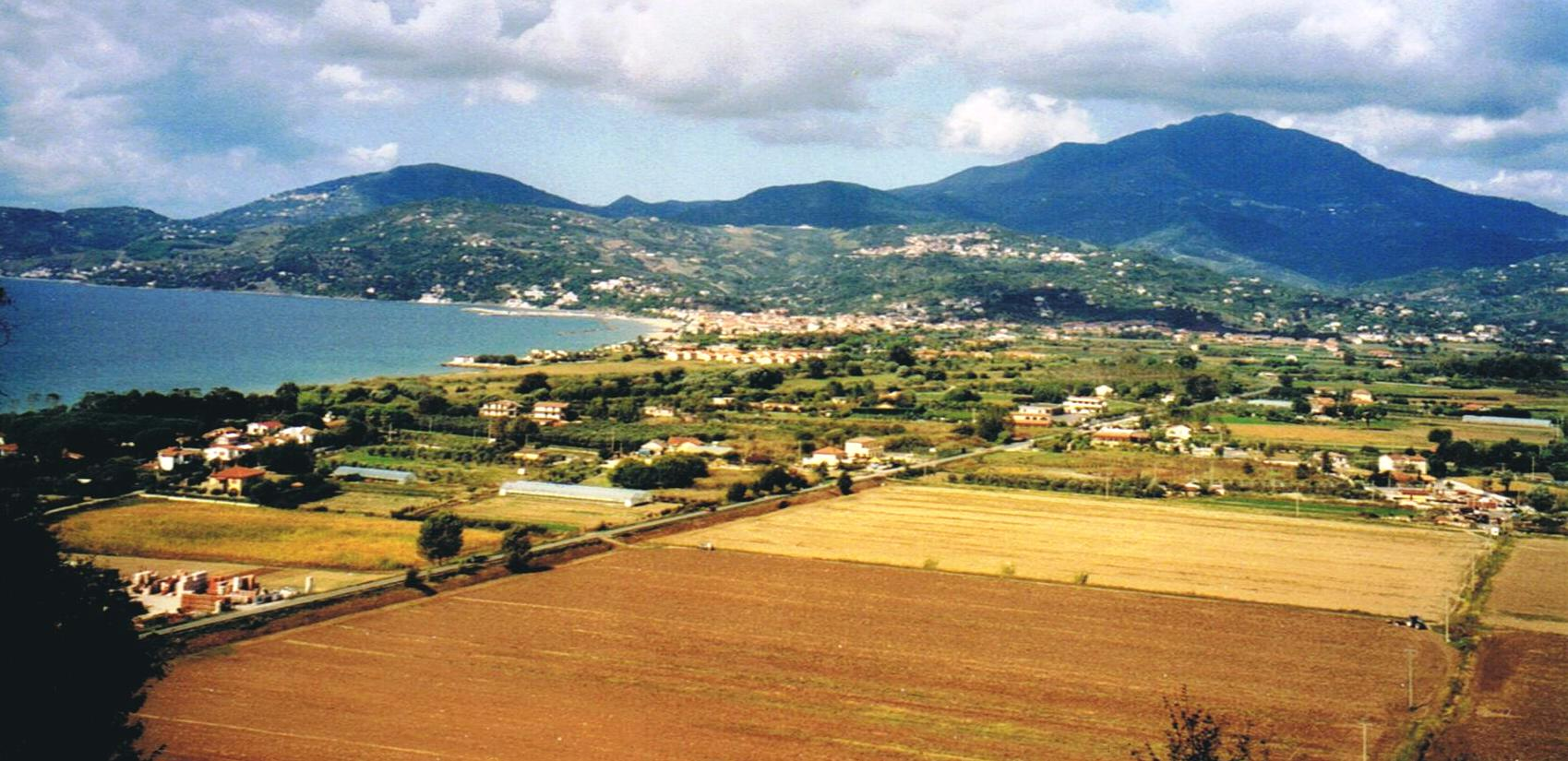
The coastline of Marina from the Plain of Velia. In background Casal Velino (on the mountain), Pioppi (left corner, by the sea), Pollica (above Pioppi), and the Stella Mountain (the highest one)

== See also ==
- Cilentan dialect
- Cilento and Vallo di Diano National Park
