= Pioppi =

- Frazione
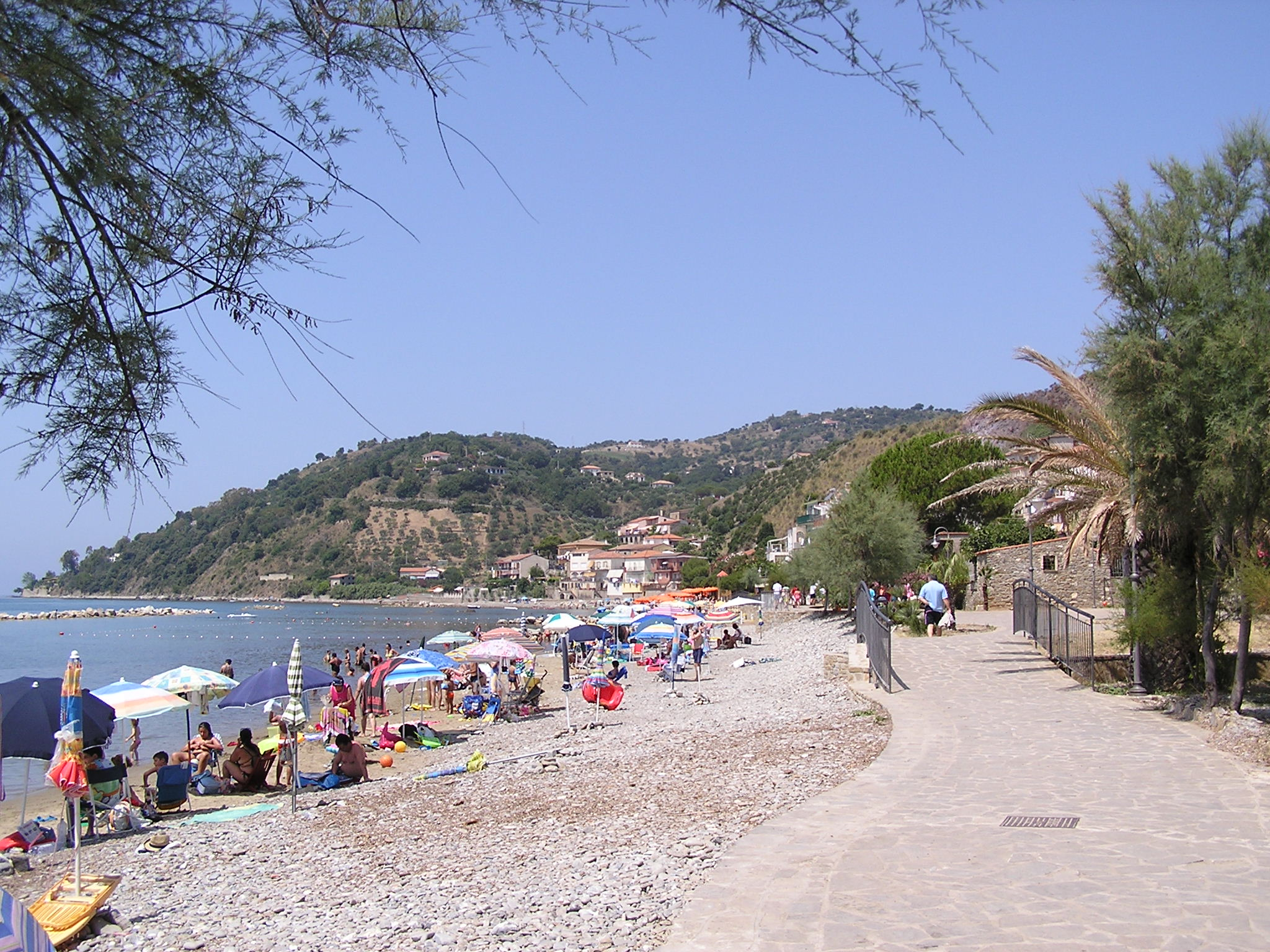
- Coastline of Pioppi

- Location of Pioppi in Italy
- Coordinates: 40°10′28.48″N 15°05′21.96″E
- Country: Italy
- Region: Campania
- Province: Salerno (SA)
- Comune: Pollica
- Elevation: 10 m (33 ft)

Population (2009)
  - Total: 317
- Demonym: Pioppesi
- Time zone: UTC+1 (CET)
  - Summer (DST): UTC+2 (CEST)
- Postal code: 84068
- Dialing code: (+39) 0974

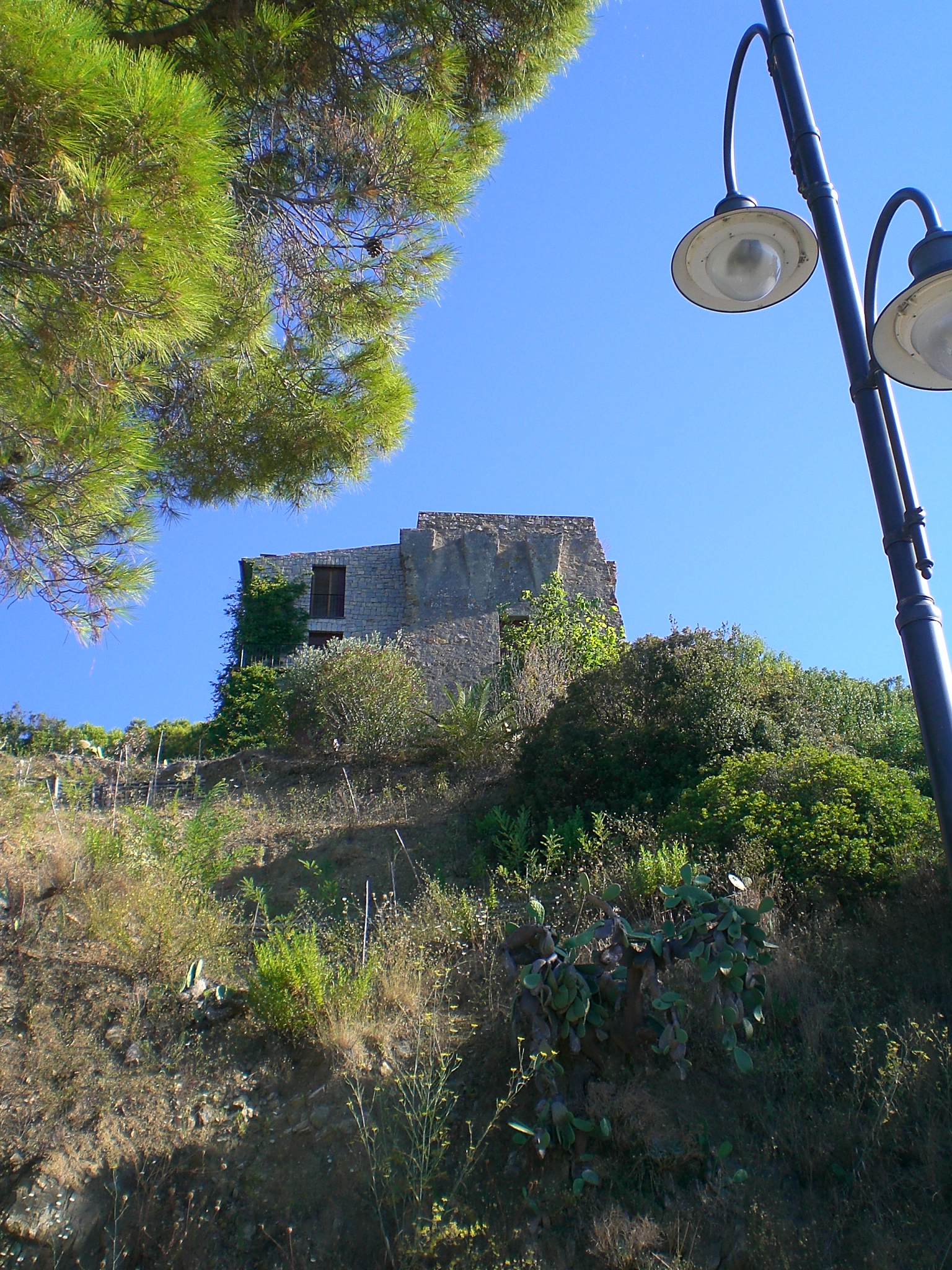
The coastal tower of Pioppi

Pioppi is an Italian hamlet (frazione) in the municipality of Pollica (Province of Salerno), in Cilento, Campania region. Its name means 'poplars' in the Italian language.

== History ==
The area of the village was a dependency of the Benedictine Abbey of Cava de' Tirreni. In 994 a church was built, named Sancta Maria de li Puppi. Around the building grew a fisherman's village, totally destroyed during the Sicilian Vespers (1282-1302) and rebuilt some years later.

== Geography ==
This coastal village by the Tyrrhenian Sea is between Acciaroli and Marina di Casalvelino (a civil parish of Casal Velino). It is 10 km from the ancient Greek town of Velia and 4.6 km from Pollica.

== Tourism ==
Pioppi, part of Cilento and Vallo di Diano National Park, is a tourist destination, especially in the summer. Due to the quality of its water, it has won the "Blue Flag Beach" award for several years.

One of its sights is the Museo Vivo del Mare ('Sea Museum'), in an ancient building named Palazzo Vinciprova.

== People ==
- Ancel Keys (1904–2004), an American physiologist, lived and worked from 1963 to 1998 in Pioppi, studying the Mediterranean diet, in his estate overlooking the Greek colony of Elea, an estate he named "Minnelea", a portmanteau from Minnesota and Elea.
- Martti Karvonen (1918–2009), known for the Karvonen method, also lived in Minnelea studying the Mediterranean diet with Ancel Keys. He spent his life after retirement in Pioppi.
- Jeremiah Stamler (1919-2022), a cardiologist, who, after retirement, divided his time between Minnelea, Long Island, and Chicago.

== Things named after ==
There is a diet book named after this village called The Pioppi Diet by Aseem Malhotra and Donal O'Neill.

== See also ==
- Acciaroli
- Cilento
- Cilento and Vallo di Diano National Park
