= Monte Stella (Cilento) =

Mountain in Italy

Stella
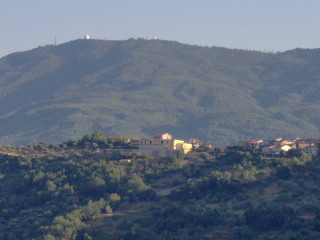

Highest point
- Elevation: 1,131 m (3,711 ft)
- Coordinates: 40°14′14.65″N 15°3′58.6″E

Geography
- Location within Italy
- Location: Province of Salerno (Campania, Italy)
- Parent range: Lucan Subappennines

Monte Stella is a mountain the Lucan Subappennines, with an elevation of 1,131 m, located in Cilento, Campania, southern Italy.

== Geography ==
At his slopes there are located the villages of Omignano, Stella Cilento, Serramezzana, Sessa Cilento, San Mauro Cilento, Pollica, San Mango Cilento, Perdifumo, Castellabate, Montecorice, Lustra and Rutino.

On the summit is located a radar station and the "Madonna del Monte Stella" church.

== History ==
On the top of the Stella mountain it has been identified a prehistoric megalithic center which dates back to at least the 3rd millennium BC., as suggested the discovery of a flint knife in the Serramezzana district.

== Pictures ==
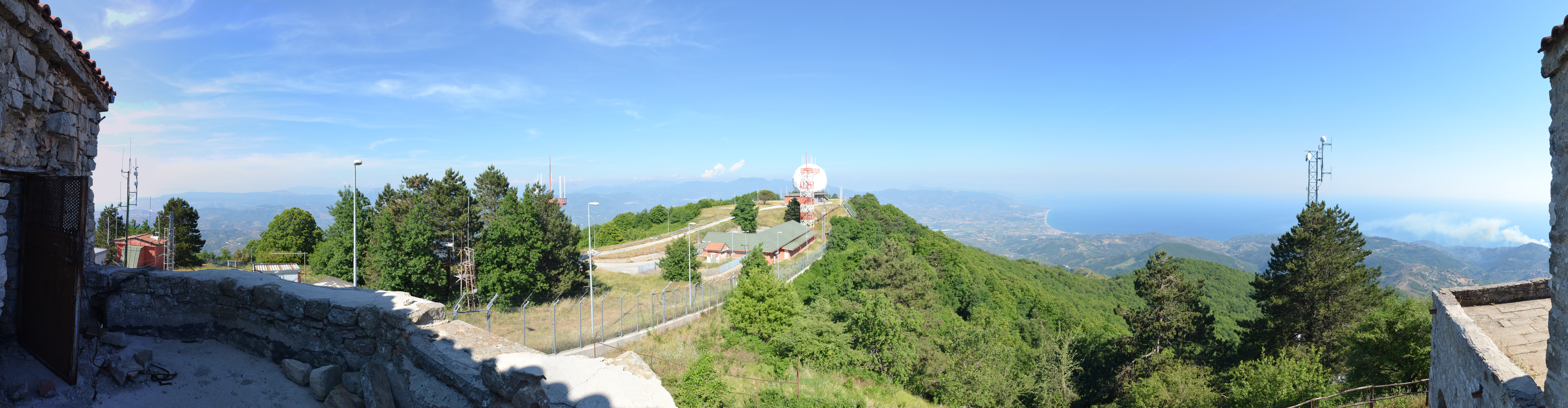
Panoramic photo, taken from the church
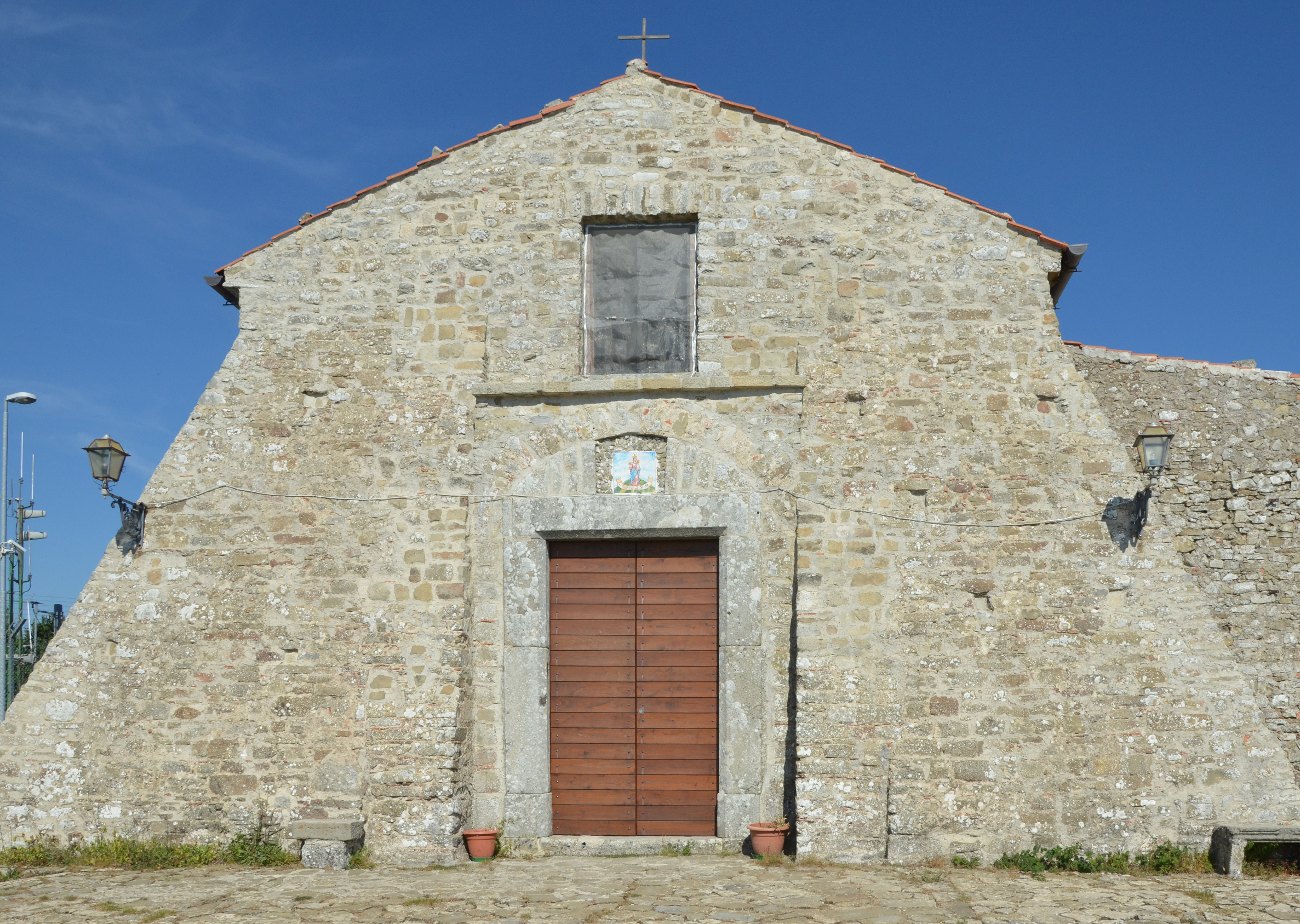
The church from the front

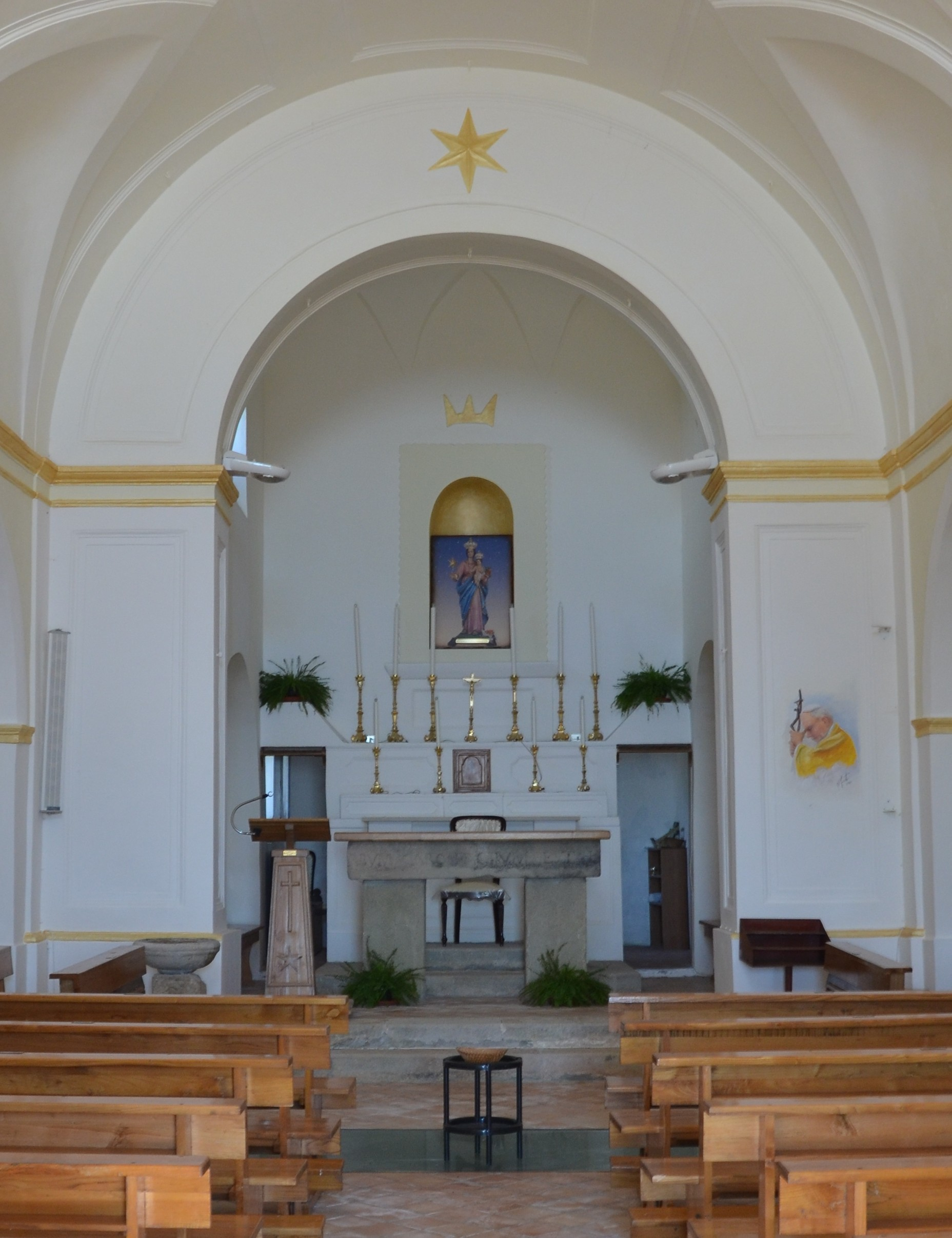
Inside the church

== See also ==
- Gelbison
- Cervati
- Alburni
- Apennine Mountains
