= Castelnuovo Cilento =

- Comune
- Comune di Castelnuovo Cilento
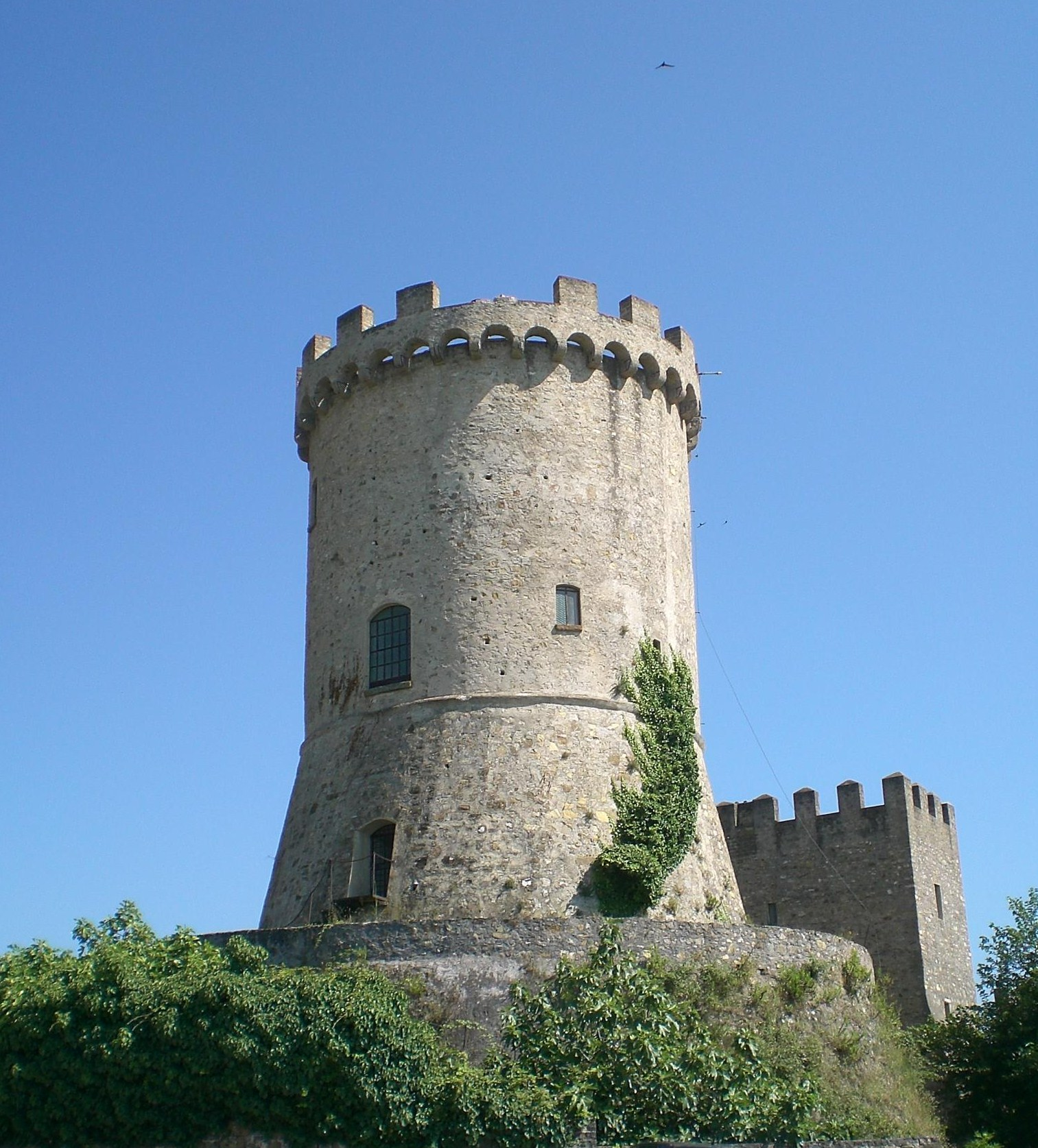
- The tower of Castelnuovo

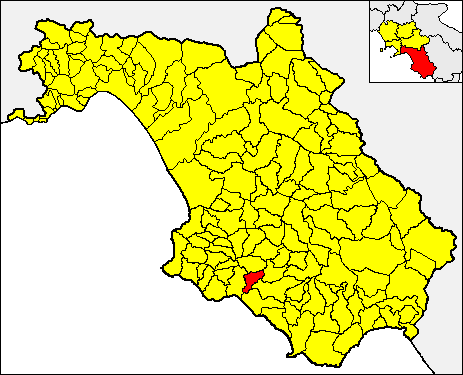
- Castelnuovo within the Province of Salerno

- Location within Italy Location within Campania
- Coordinates: 40°13′04.4″N 15°10′37.6″E
- Country: Italy
- Region: Campania
- Province: Salerno (SA)
- Frazioni: Salicuneta, Vallo Scalo, Velina

Area
  - Total: 18 km^{2} (6.9 sq mi)
- Elevation: 280 m (920 ft)

Population (30 June 2017)
  - Total: 2,810
  - Density: 160/km^{2} (400/sq mi)
- Demonym: Castelnovesi
- Time zone: UTC+1 (CET)
  - Summer (DST): UTC+2 (CEST)
- Postal code: 84040
- Dialing code: 0974
- ISTAT code: 065032
- Patron saint: Mary Magdalene
- Saint day: July 22
- Website: Official website

Castelnuovo Cilento (Cilentan: Castiedde Nuove) is a town and comune in the province of Salerno in the Campania region of south-western Italy.

== History ==
The medieval village of Castelnuovo was part of the fief of the Agnello family from Senerchia. The current toponym, adding Cilento, was adopted in 1861, after the Italian unification.

== Geography ==
Castelnuovo is a town located on a hill above the plain of river Alento, next to the town of Vallo della Lucania and the Ancient Greek city of Velia. It is part of Cilento and is included into its national park.

The municipality borders with Ascea, Casal Velino, Ceraso, Salento and Vallo della Lucania. It counts the hamlets (frazioni) of Velina (formerly known as Casalvelino Scalo), Vallo Scalo (shared with Casal Velino) and the rural locality of Salicuneta.

== Transport ==
The territory of Castelnuovo is served by a pair of railway stations, Vallo della Lucania-Castelnuovo and Casal Velino, both on the Naples-Reggio Calabria line. The first one is located in Vallo Scalo and is also served by long-distance trains, the second is located in Velina, and is out of service. It is also served by the highway SP 430 Battipaglia-Agropoli-Vallo-Sapri, at the exit "Vallo Scalo-Salento".

== See also ==
- Cilentan Coast
- Cilentan dialect
- Charles C. A. Baldi, great-great grandfather of Taylor Swift
