= Vallo della Lucania–Castelnuovo railway station =

Railway station in Italy

Vallo della Lucania
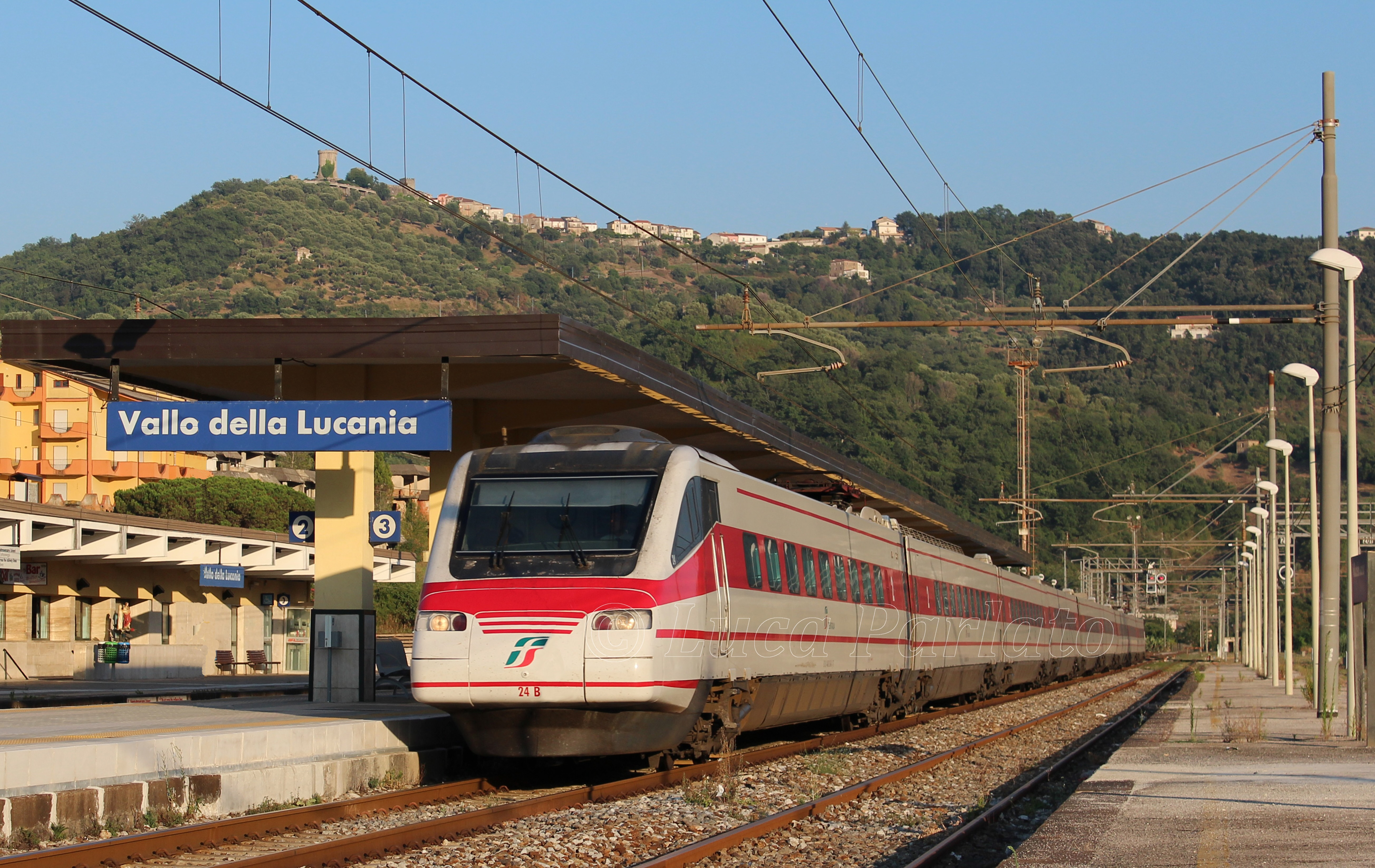

General information
- Location: Casal Velino, Province of Salerno, Campania; Italy
- Coordinates: 40°13′46.42″N 15°09′30.21″E
- Owner: Rete Ferroviaria Italiana
- Operator: Trenitalia
- Line: Salerno–Reggio Calabria railway

History
- Opened: 1887
- Former names: Castelnuovo–Vallo (until 1942)

Services
Preceding station	Trenitalia	Following station
Agropoli–Castellabate towards Milano Centrale	InterCity Notte; Milan–Syracuse	Ascea towards Siracusa
Location
- Location within Campania Location within Italy

Vallo della Lucania–Castelnuovo is a railway station located on the Salerno–Reggio Calabria line. Located in the municipality of Casal Velino, The station also serves Vallo della Lucania and Castelnuovo Cilento.

== History ==
The station was opened in 1887 with the opening of the Agropoli-Vallo della Lucania railway section.

Until 1942 the station was named Castelnuovo-Vallo.

== Structure ==
The station has a passenger building and four crossing tracks, three of which are dedicated to passenger service, equipped with docks, shelters and underpasses. There is also a three-track freight station partially used but from which electrification has been removed.

== Operator ==
The station is served by regional trains run by Trenitalia under the service contract stipulated with the Campania Region and by long-distance connections carried out by Trenitalia eNTV.
