= Angelo Vassallo =

Italian politician (1953–2010)

Angelo Vassallo (Italian pronunciation: [ˈandʒelo vasˈsallo]; 22 September 1953 – 5 September 2010) was an Italian politician who served as the mayor of Pollica. He was assassinated in 2010.

== Death ==
On 5 September 2010, Vassallo was shot to death by unknown person(s) with nine bullets in his native town of Acciaroli at around 22:15. He is survived by his wife and two children.

== Legacy ==
The film Mayor Fisherman (Il sindaco pescatore, 2016) was loosely based on the story of Vassallo.

The film Benvenuti al Sud was dedicated to him
