= Ascea railway station =

Railway station in Italy

Ascea
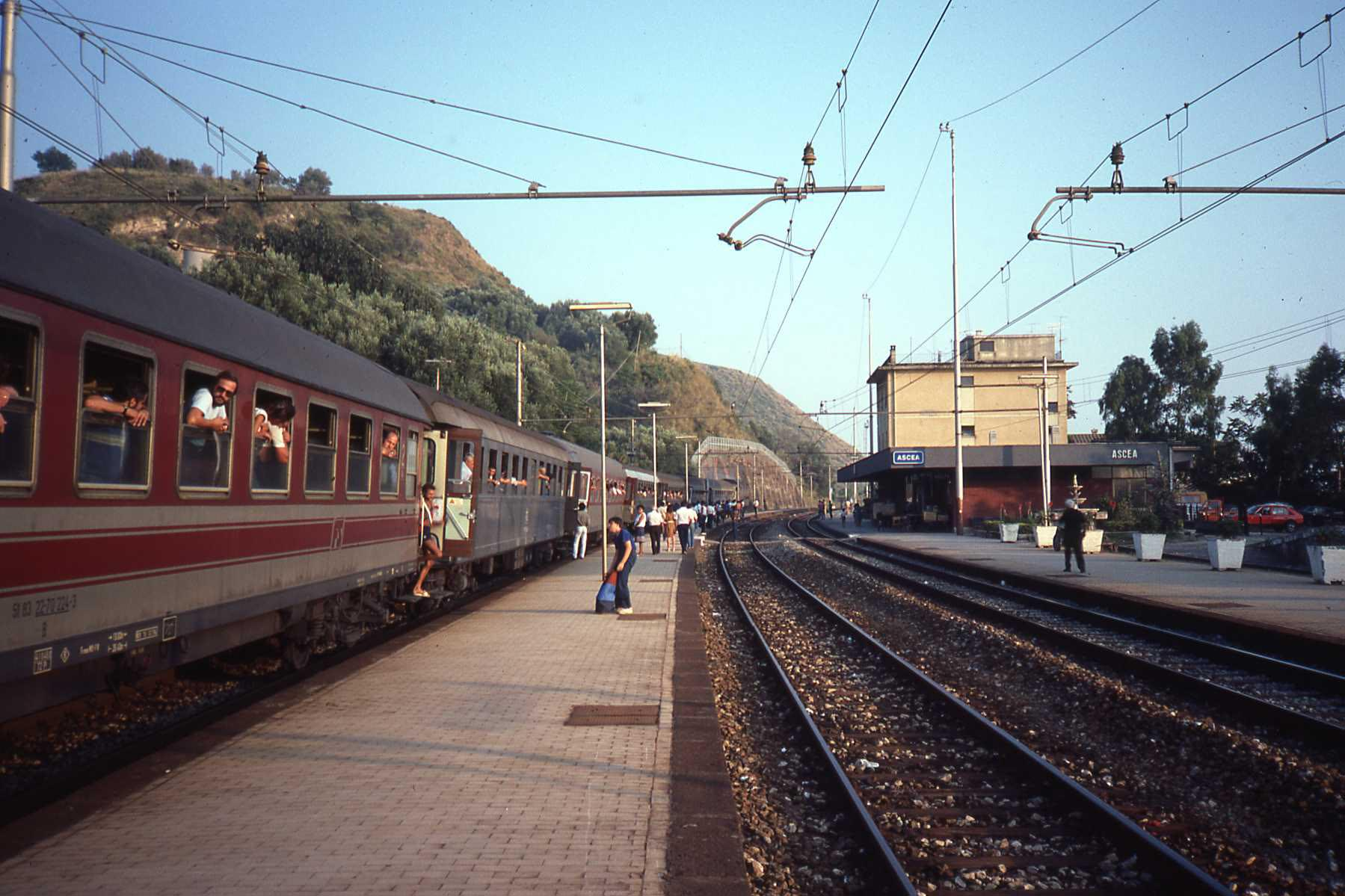
- Train and station platforms in 1984

General information
- Location: Ascea, Province of Salerno, Campania; Italy
- Coordinates: 40°08′27.75″N 15°10′20.25″E
- Owner: Rete Ferroviaria Italiana
- Operator: Trenitalia
- Line: Salerno–Reggio Calabria railway

History
- Opened: 1889

Services
Preceding station	Trenitalia	Following station
Vallo della Lucania–Castelnuovo towards Milano Centrale	InterCity Notte; Milan–Syracuse	Pisciotta–Palinuro towards Siracusa
Location
- Location within Campania Location within Italy

Ascea is a railway station located on the Salerno–Reggio Calabria line. It serves the town of Ascea.

== Operator ==
The station is served by regional trains run by Trenitalia under the service contract stipulated with the Campania Region and by long-distance connections carried out by Trenitalia eNTV.
