= San Mango =

San Mango may refer to several places of Italy:

- San Mango Cilento, a hamlet of Sessa Cilento, Province of Salerno, Campania
- San Mango d'Aquino, a municipality of the Province of Catanzaro, Calabria
- San Mango Piemonte, a municipality of the Province of Salerno, Campania
- San Mango sul Calore, a municipality of the Province of Avellino, Campania
