= Casal Velino =

- Comune
- Comune di Casal Velino
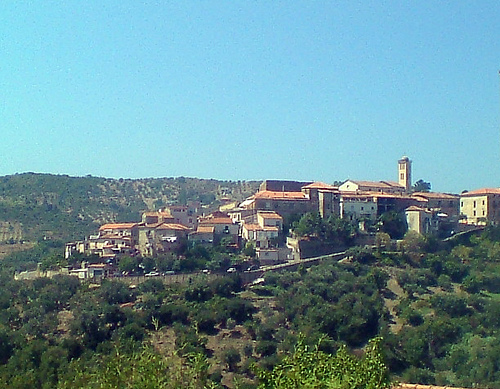

- Coat of arms

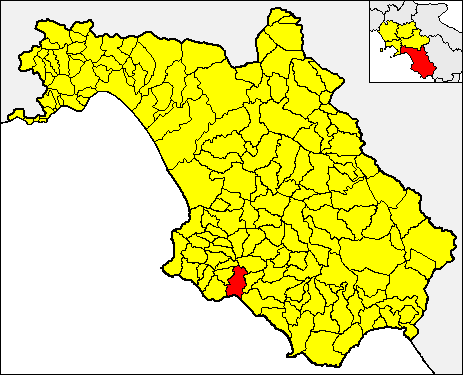
- Casal Velino within the Province of Salerno

- Location within Italy Location within Campania
- Coordinates: 40°11′20.4″N 15°06′37.3″E
- Country: Italy
- Region: Campania
- Province: Salerno (SA)
- Frazioni: Acquavella, Bivio Acquavella, Marina di Casalvelino, Vallo Scalo, Verduzio (Fornari)

Government
  - Mayor: Silvia Pisapia

Area
  - Total: 31.71 km^{2} (12.24 sq mi)
- Elevation: 170 m (560 ft)

Population (31 May 2017)
  - Total: 5,252
  - Density: 165.6/km^{2} (429.0/sq mi)
- Demonym: Casalvelinesi
- Time zone: UTC+1 (CET)
  - Summer (DST): UTC+2 (CEST)
- Postal code: 84040, 84050
- Dialing code: 0974
- ISTAT code: 065028
- Patron saint: St. Blaise
- Saint day: February 3
- Website: Official website

Casal Velino, also spelled Casalvelino, is a town and comune in the province of Salerno in the Campania region of south-western Italy.

== History ==
The village, first mentioned in the 11th century, was named Casalicchio until 1893. It was renamed Casal Velino in homage to the ancient and nearby town of Velia, whose male demonym is "Velino".

== Geography ==
Casal Velino is a hill town located in Cilento and included into its national park, located some km from the Ancient Greek city of Velia.

The municipality borders with Ascea, Castelnuovo Cilento, Omignano, Pollica, Salento and Stella Cilento. It counts the hamlets (frazioni) of Acquavella, Bivio Acquavella, Marina di Casalvelino, Vallo Scalo (shared with Castelnuovo Cilento) and Verduzio.

== Transport ==
Casal Velino railway station|Casal Velino station, part of Naples-Reggio Calabria line and out of service, is located in the village of Velina (formerly Casalvelino Scalo), a frazione of Castelnuovo close to Bivio Acquavella. Another station, Vallo della Lucania-Castelnuovo railway station|Vallo della Lucania-Castelnuovo, is located in Vallo Scalo and is also served by long-distance trains.

The port of Marina di Casalvelino is served by the hydrofoil's line MM6W Naples-Sorrento-Marina di Camerota, part of a local passenger ferry network named Metrò del Mare.

== See also ==
- Cilentan Coast
- Cilentan dialect
