= Pisciotta–Palinuro railway station =

Railway station in Italy

Pisciotta–Palinuro
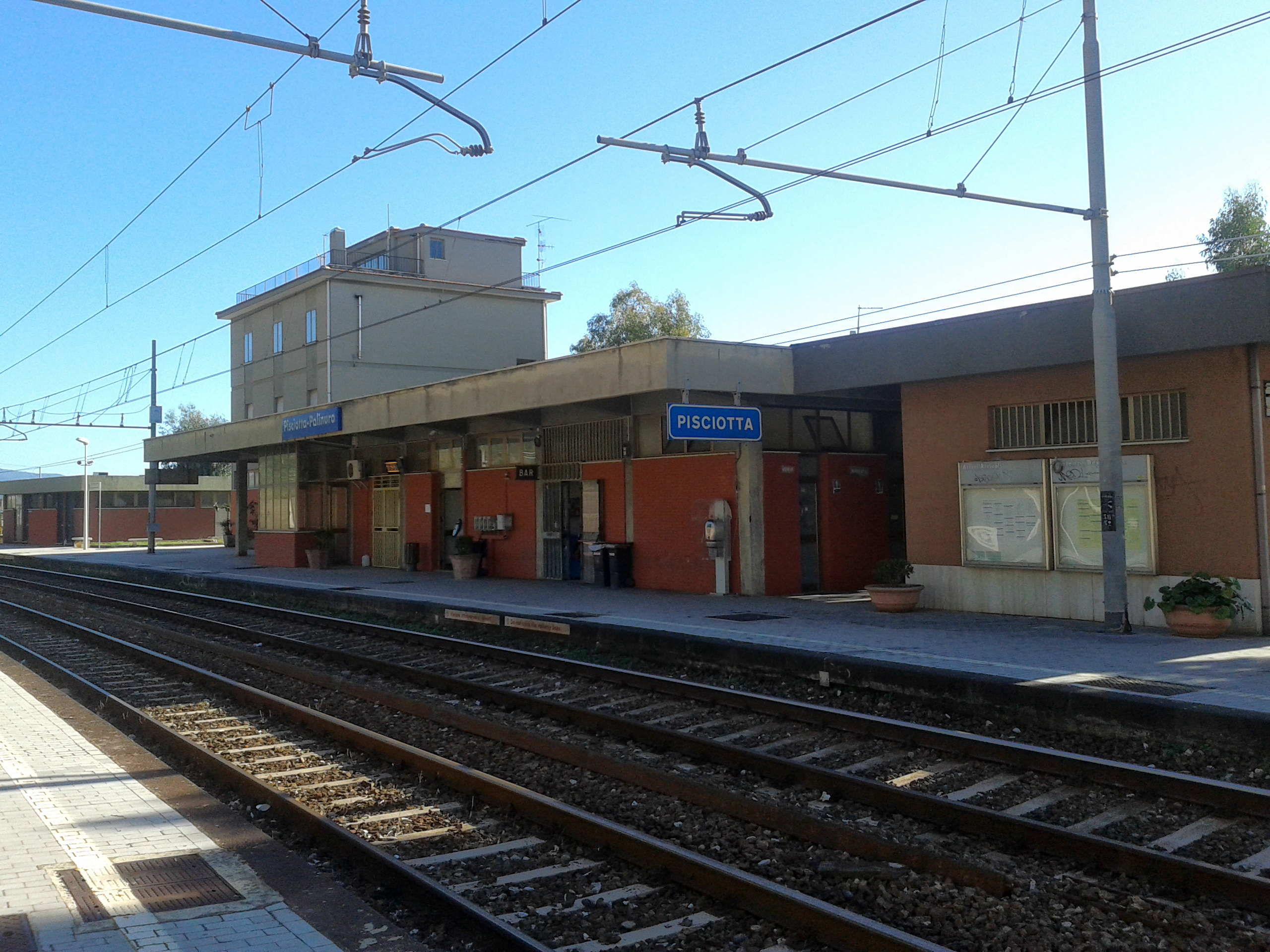

General information
- Location: Pisciotta, Province of Salerno, Campania; Italy
- Coordinates: 40°05′28.92″N 15°14′36.06″E
- Owner: Rete Ferroviaria Italiana
- Operator: Trenitalia
- Line: Salerno–Reggio Calabria railway

Services
Preceding station	Trenitalia	Following station
Ascea towards Milano Centrale	InterCity Notte; Milan–Syracuse	Sapri towards Siracusa
Location
- Location within Campania Location within Italy

Pisciotta–Palinuro is a railway station located on the Salerno–Reggio Calabria line. It serves the towns of Pisciotta and Palinuro.

== Operator ==
The station is served by regional trains run by Trenitalia under the service contract stipulated with the Campania Region and by long-distance connections carried out by Trenitalia eNTV.
