= Stella Cilento =

- Comune
- Comune di Stella Cilento
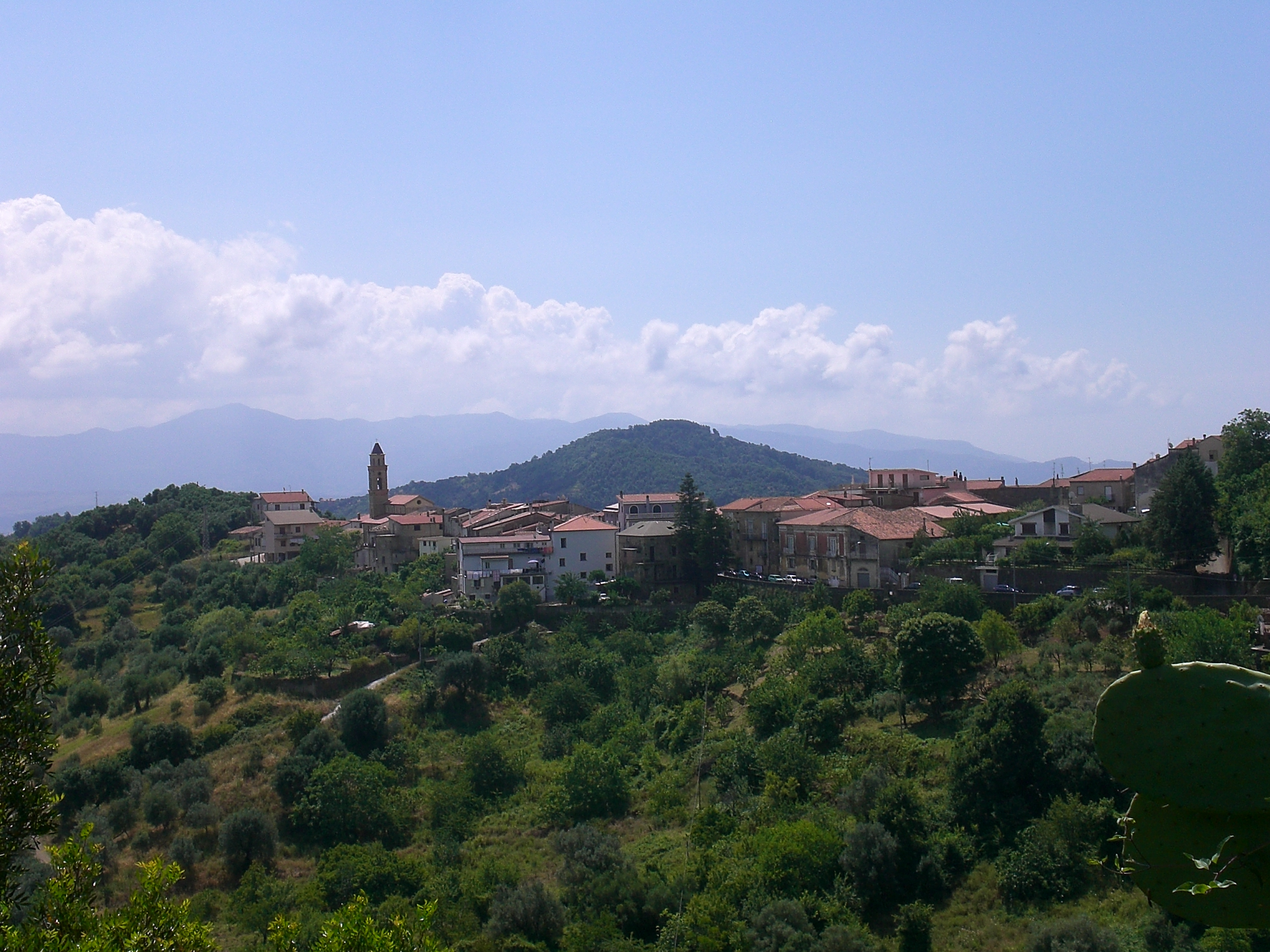

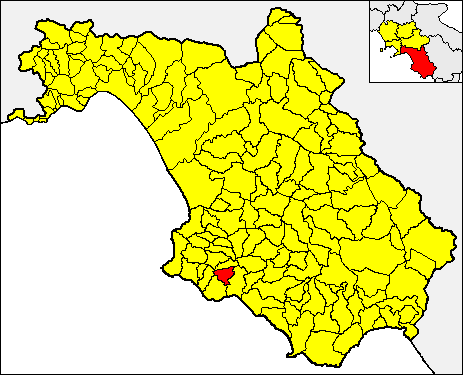
- Stella Cilento within the Province of Salerno

- Location within Italy Location within Campania
- Coordinates: 40°14′N 15°6′E
- Country: Italy
- Region: Campania
- Province: Salerno (SA)
- Frazioni: Amalafede, Droro, Guarrazzano, San Giovanni

Government
  - Mayor: Francesco Massanova

Area
  - Total: 14.52 km^{2} (5.61 sq mi)
- Elevation: 386 m (1,266 ft)

Population (31 August 2015)
  - Total: 742
  - Density: 51.1/km^{2} (132/sq mi)
- Demonym: Stellani
- Time zone: UTC+1 (CET)
  - Summer (DST): UTC+2 (CEST)
- Postal code: 84070
- Dialing code: 0974
- Patron saint: St. Nicholas
- Saint day: Second Sunday in August
- Website: Official website

Stella Cilento (Cilentan: Stella Ciliendo) is a town and comune in the province of Salerno in the Campania region of south-western Italy. Its name means Star of Cilento in the Italian language.

== Geography ==
Stella, named after the neighbouring mountain, is located in the middle of Cilento. It borders with the municipalities of Casal Velino, Omignano, Pollica and Sessa Cilento. It counts the frazioni of Amalafede, Droro, Guarrazzano and San Giovanni.

== See also ==
- Monte Stella
- Cilento and Vallo di Diano National Park
