= San Mauro Cilento =

- Comune
- Comune di San Mauro Cilento
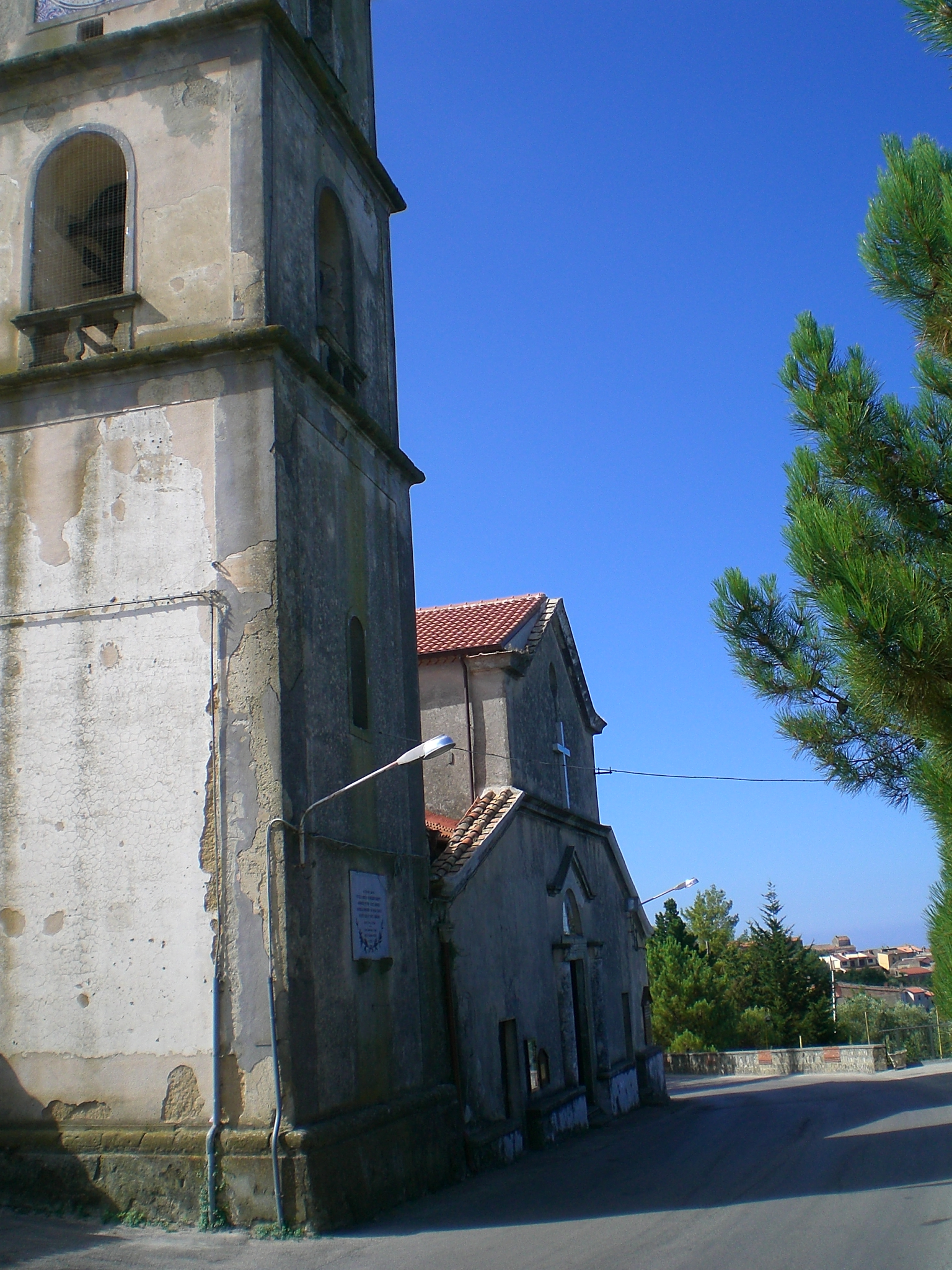
- St. Maurus church in Casalsottano

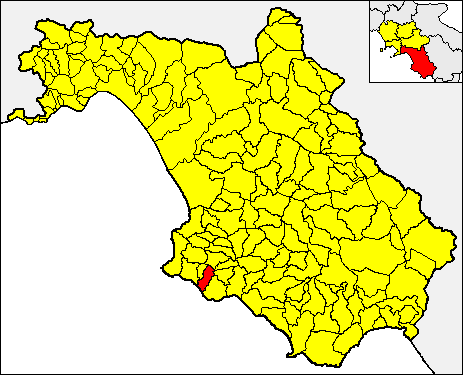
- San Mauro Cilento within the Province of Salerno

- Location within Italy Location within Campania
- Coordinates: 40°13′35.98″N 15°02′44.02″E
- Country: Italy
- Region: Campania
- Province: Salerno (SA)
- Frazioni: Casalsottano, Mezzatorre

Government
  - Mayor: Commissar

Area
  - Total: 15.28 km^{2} (5.90 sq mi)
- Elevation: 560 m (1,840 ft)

Population (31 August 2015)
  - Total: 893
  - Density: 58.4/km^{2} (151/sq mi)
- Demonym: Sanmauresi
- Time zone: UTC+1 (CET)
  - Summer (DST): UTC+2 (CEST)
- Postal code: 84070
- Dialing code: 0974
- Patron saint: Saint Maurus
- Saint day: July 11
- Website: Official website

San Mauro Cilento is a town and comune in the province of Salerno in the Campania region of south-western Italy.

== History ==
The town was first mentioned in 1130. Its secondary toponym, Casalsoprano (or Casal Soprano, i. e. Upper Farmhouse), is closely related to that of the nearby and lower village of Casalsottano (i.e. Lower Farmhouse). In 1453, after the fall of Constantinople, the wealthy family of the Mazza fled the city and contributed to the construction and continued development of San Mauro Cilento.

== Geography ==
San Mauro is a hillside town located in central Cilento, below the Stella mountain (1,131 amsl). It is divided into the quarters of Ratto, Serra, Sorrentini and Vallongella. Its municipal territory, part of the Cilento and Vallo di Diano National Park, spans to the coast and borders with Montecorice, Pollica, Serramezzana and Sessa Cilento.

Its hamlets (frazioni) are the villages of Casalsottano and Mezzatorre.

== Culture ==
The town includes two little museums: the Eleousa, that includes an archive and a library, and the Parish Museum of San Mauro.

One of the most prominent cultural events is Settembre ai Fichi (i.e. "September to the Figs"), a sagra that is held every year from the end of August to the beginnings of September.

== See also ==
- Cilentan Coast
- Cilentan dialect
