= Omignano =

- Comune
- Comune di Omignano
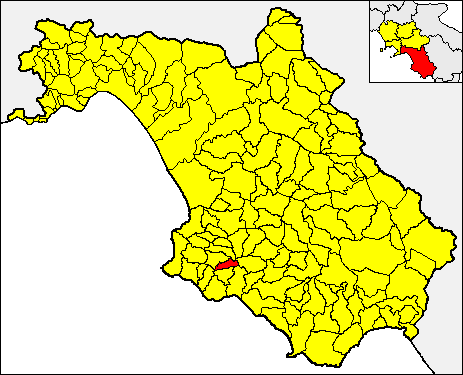
- Omignano within the Province of Salerno

- Location within Italy Location within Campania
- Coordinates: 40°15′N 15°4′E
- Country: Italy
- Region: Campania
- Province: Salerno (SA)
- Frazioni: Cerreta, Pirolepre

Government
  - Mayor: Giancarlo Emanuele Malatesta

Area
  - Total: 10.1 km^{2} (3.9 sq mi)
- Elevation: 540 m (1,770 ft)

Population (31 December 2017)
  - Total: 1,645
  - Density: 163/km^{2} (422/sq mi)
- Demonym: Omignanesi
- Time zone: UTC+1 (CET)
  - Summer (DST): UTC+2 (CEST)
- Postal code: 84060
- Dialing code: 0974
- ISTAT code: 065084
- Website: Official website

Omignano is a town and comune in the province of Salerno in the Campania region of south-western Italy.

== Geography ==
The municipality borders Casal Velino, Lustra, Salento, Sessa Cilento and Stella Cilento.

== See also ==
- Cilento
