= Acciaroli =

- Frazione
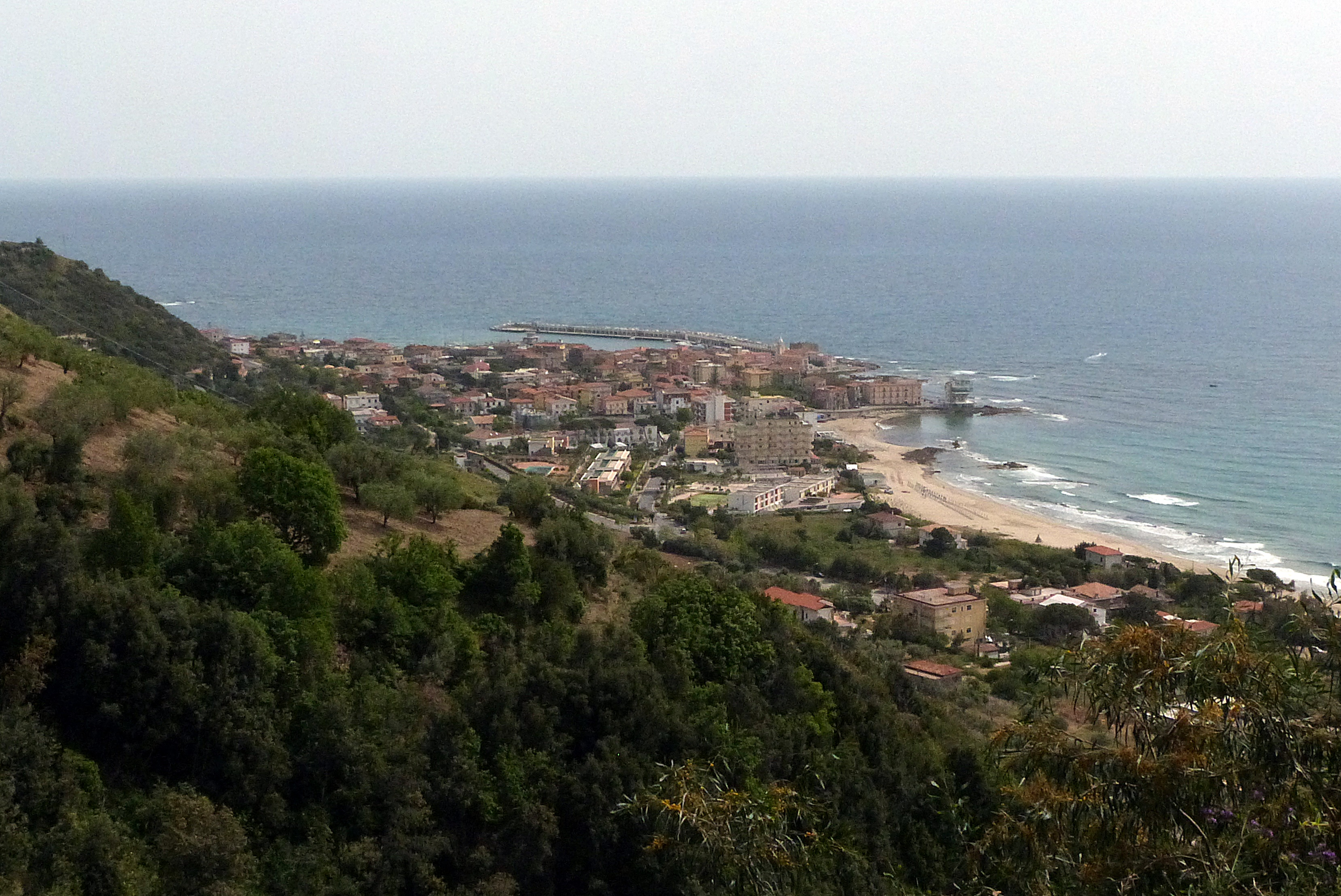
- Acciaroli in 2017

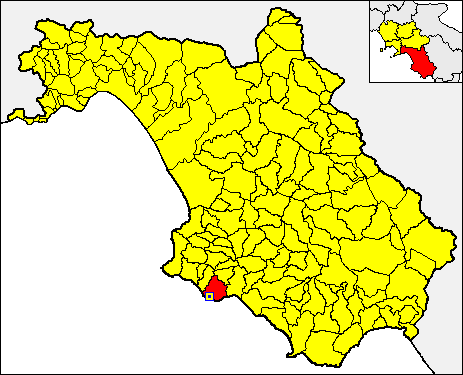
- Locator map within the province and the municipality

- Location of Acciaroli in Italy
- Coordinates: 40°10′51.61″N 15°01′40.92″E
- Country: Italy
- Region: Campania
- Province: Salerno (SA)
- Comune: Pollica
- Elevation: 6 m (20 ft)

Population (2009)
  - Total: 645
- Demonym: Acciarolesi
- Time zone: UTC+1 (CET)
  - Summer (DST): UTC+2 (CEST)
- Postal code: 84068
- Dialing code: (+39) 0974
- Website: Official website

Acciaroli is an Italian hamlet (frazione), the most populous in the comune of Pollica, Province of Salerno, in the Campania Region.

== Geography ==
Acciaroli is a port on the Cilento coast on the Tyrrhenian Sea. The largest township in its comune, followed by the hamlet of Pioppi, it is six kilometers from Pollica, 20 from Santa Maria di Castellabate, 17 from Velia, 30 from Agropoli, and 70 from Salerno.

== Tourism ==
The town is a part of "Cilento and Vallo di Diano National Park", whose natural environment is made up of the "maquis shrubland" typical of the Mediterranean region.

It is a major tourist destination, especially during summer, because it has grown famous nationally for its water quality, having earned the "Blue Flag beach" title and the "Five Sails" of Legambiente, an Italian environmentalist association, for several years.

== Culture ==
After World War II, Ernest Hemingway chose Acciaroli as a place to stay during trips to Italy.

=== Cuisine ===
In and around the area of Acciaroli, a very pungent variety of rosemary is cultivated, and is consumed regularly in the local cuisine. It is claimed to smell ten times stronger than the average rosemary. Due to the vast health benefits from consuming rosemary, as well as the other various ingredients regularly consumed in the local diet, it is claimed that this has aided the unusually high number of centenarians in the area live as long as they have.

=== Centenarians ===
In 2016, scientists studied the town because of its unusually high number of centenarians, some 300, with 20 percent of those reaching the age of 110. This longevity occurs despite the fact that many of the elderly in Acciaroli smoke or are overweight.

The centenarians of Acciaroli are also known to have very low rates of heart disease and of Alzheimer's disease.

== Gallery ==
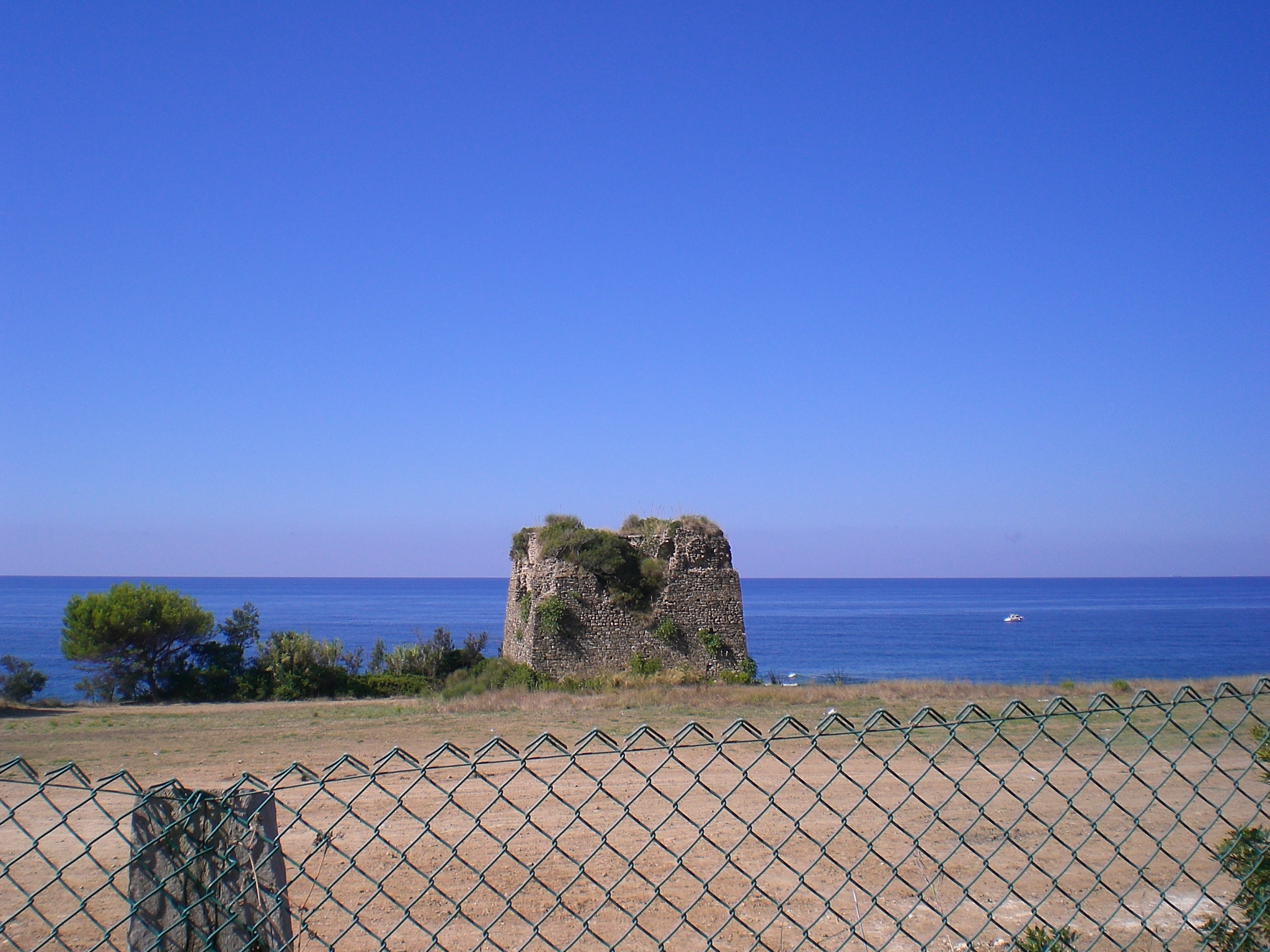
Remains of the coastal tower "Torre La Punta"

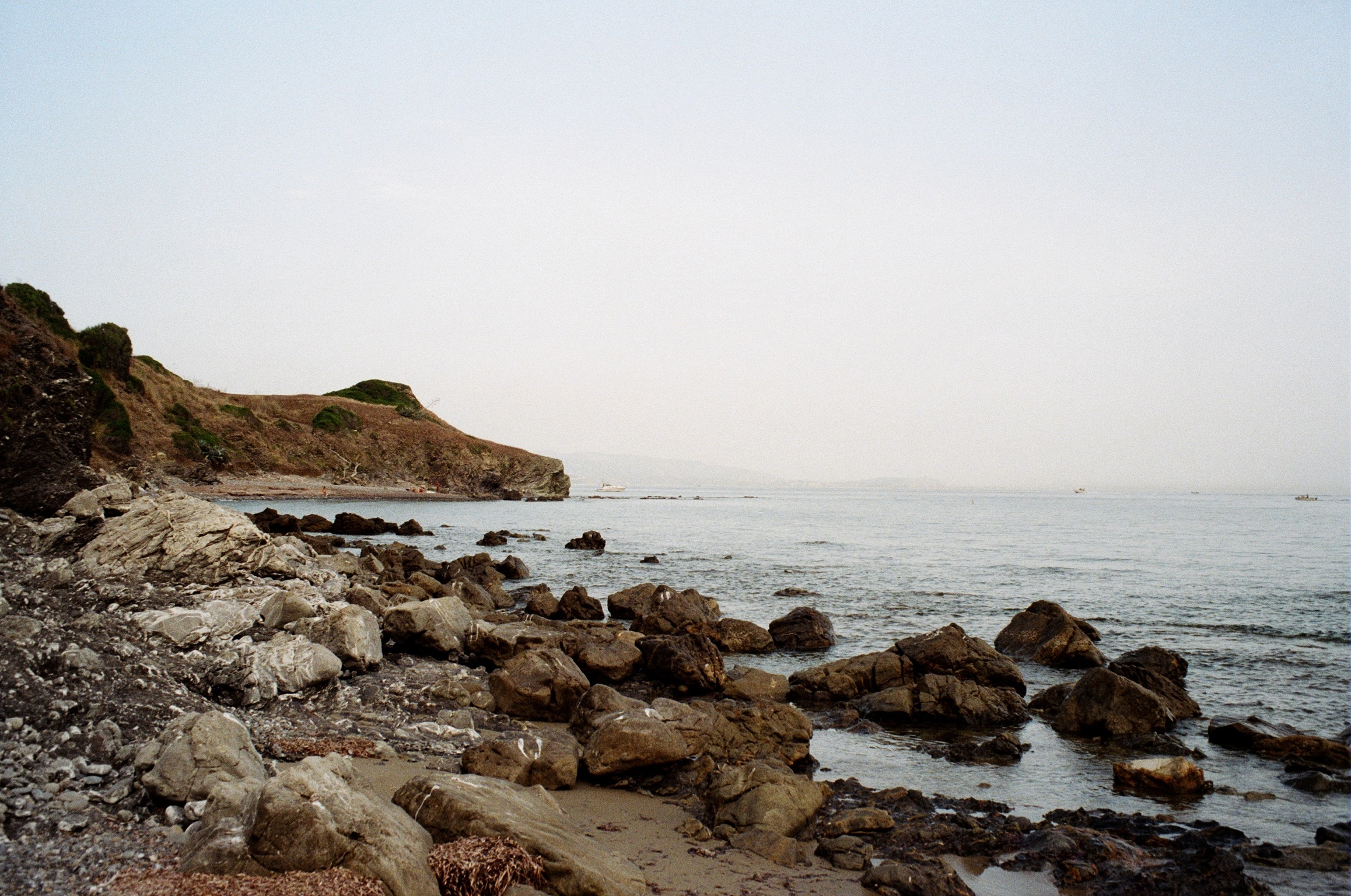
The beach of "Torre La Punta", on the natural reserve "Oasi Blu La Punta"

== See also ==
- Pioppi
- Cilento
- Cilento and Vallo di Diano National Park
