= Sessa Cilento =

- Comune
- Comune di Sessa Cilento
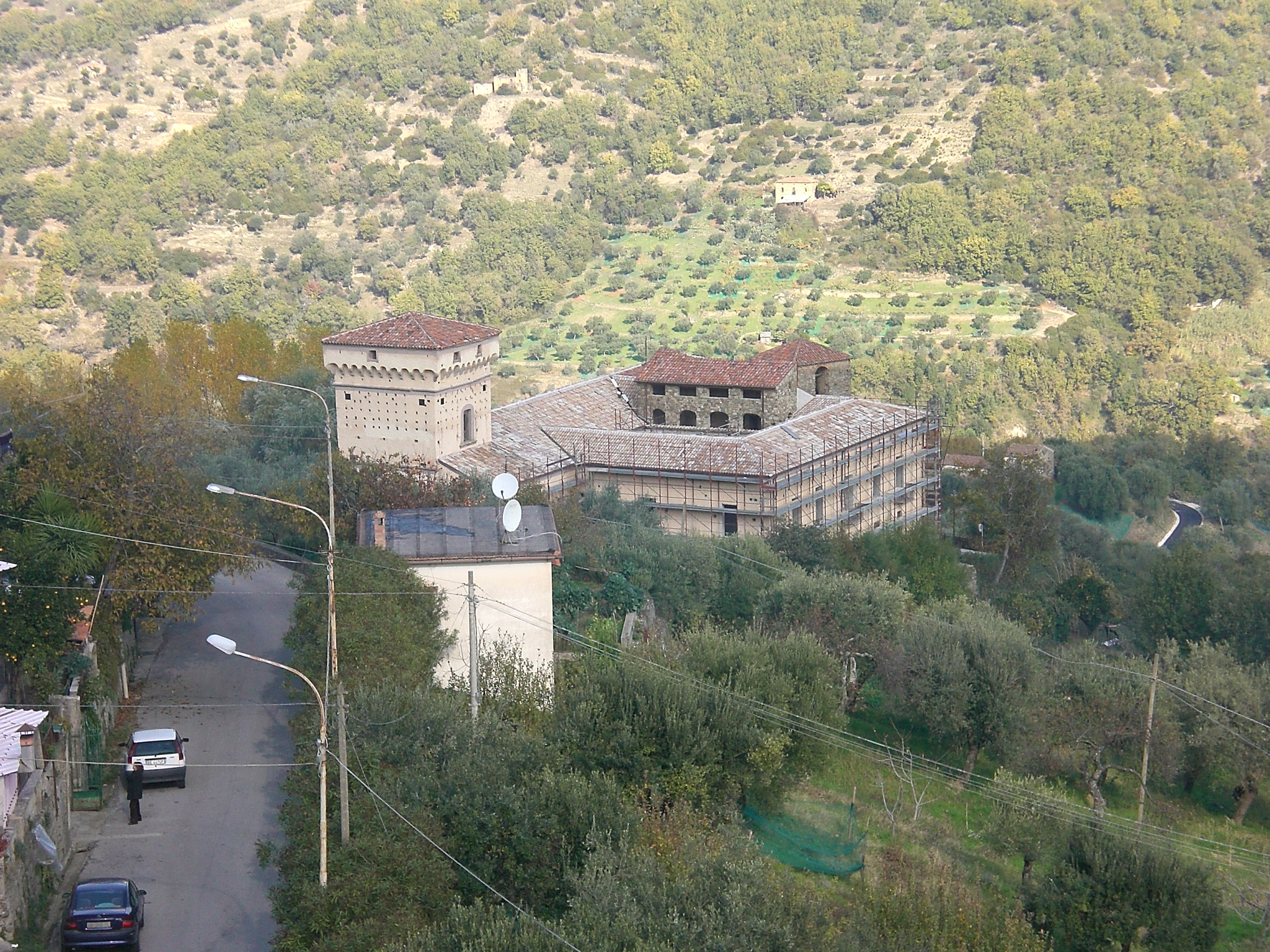
- Coppola Palace in the village of Valle

- Coat of arms

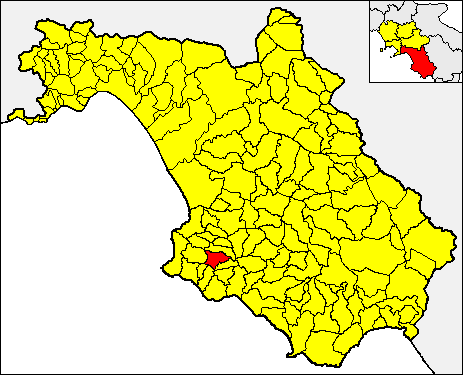
- Sessa Cilento within the Province of Salerno

- Location within Italy Location within Campania
- Coordinates: 40°16′N 15°5′E
- Country: Italy
- Region: Campania
- Province: Salerno (SA)
- Frazioni: Casigliano, Castagneta, Felitto Piano, San Mango Cilento, Santa Lucia, Valle

Government
  - Mayor: Giovanni Chirico

Area
  - Total: 18.04 km^{2} (6.97 sq mi)
- Elevation: 520 m (1,710 ft)

Population (31 December 2010)
  - Total: 1,381
  - Density: 76.55/km^{2} (198.3/sq mi)
- Demonym: Sessesi
- Time zone: UTC+1 (CET)
  - Summer (DST): UTC+2 (CEST)
- Postal code: 84074
- Dialing code: 0974
- Patron saint: St. Stephen
- Saint day: 3 August
- Website: Official website

Sessa Cilento (from Greek Σύεσσα - Syessa) is a town and comune in the province of Salerno in the Campania region of south-western Italy.

== Geography ==
Sessa Cilento is located in Cilento and in its National Park. borders with the municipalities of Lustra, Omignano, Perdifumo, Pollica, San Mauro Cilento, Serramezzana and Stella Cilento.

The municipality counts the frazioni of Casigliano, Castagneta, Felitto Piano, San Mango Cilento, Santa Lucia, Offoli and Valle.

== See also ==
- Cilento and Vallo di Diano National Park
