= San Mango Cilento =

- Frazione
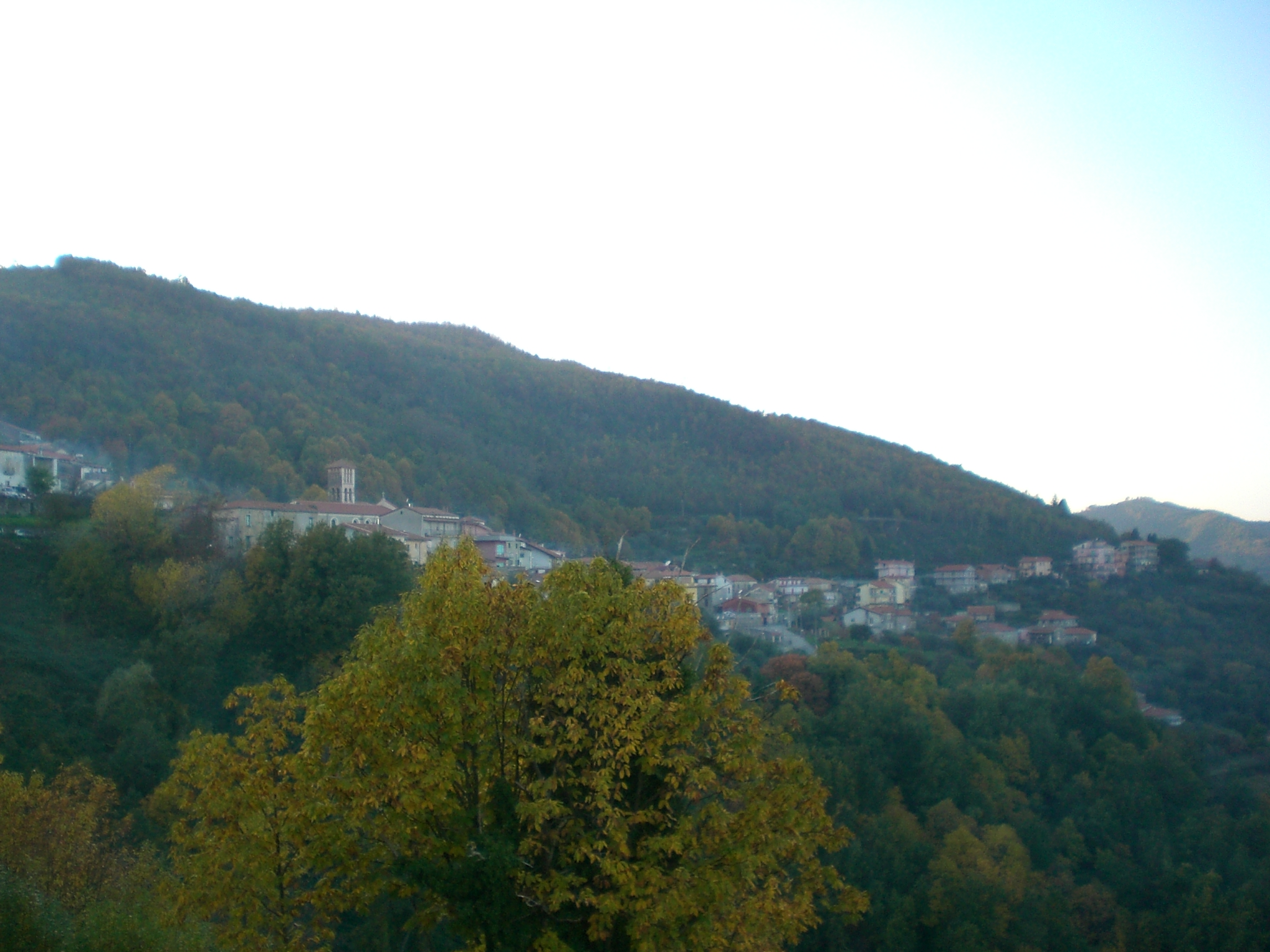

- Location of San Mango Cilento in Italy
- Coordinates: 40°15′50.72″N 15°3′37.4″E
- Country: Italy
- Region: Campania
- Province: Salerno (SA)
- Comune: Sessa Cilento
- Elevation: 561 m (1,841 ft)

Population (2009)
  - Total: 466
- Demonym: Sammanghesi
- Time zone: UTC+1 (CET)
  - Summer (DST): UTC+2 (CEST)
- Postal code: 84074
- Dialing code: (+39) 0974
- Website: Official website

San Mango Cilento is an Italian hamlet (frazione) of the municipality of Sessa Cilento in the province of Salerno, Campania region. As of 2009 its population was of 466.

== Geography ==
The village is located on a hill at 561 amsl, below the Stella mountain, in the middle of Cilento, and is part of its National Park. San Mango is 1.9 km (1 mi) far from Sessa Cilento, 20 km (12 mi) from Agropoli and 76 km (47 mi) from Salerno.

== See also ==
- Cilento and Vallo di Diano National Park
