= Serramezzana =

- Comune
- Comune di Serramezzana
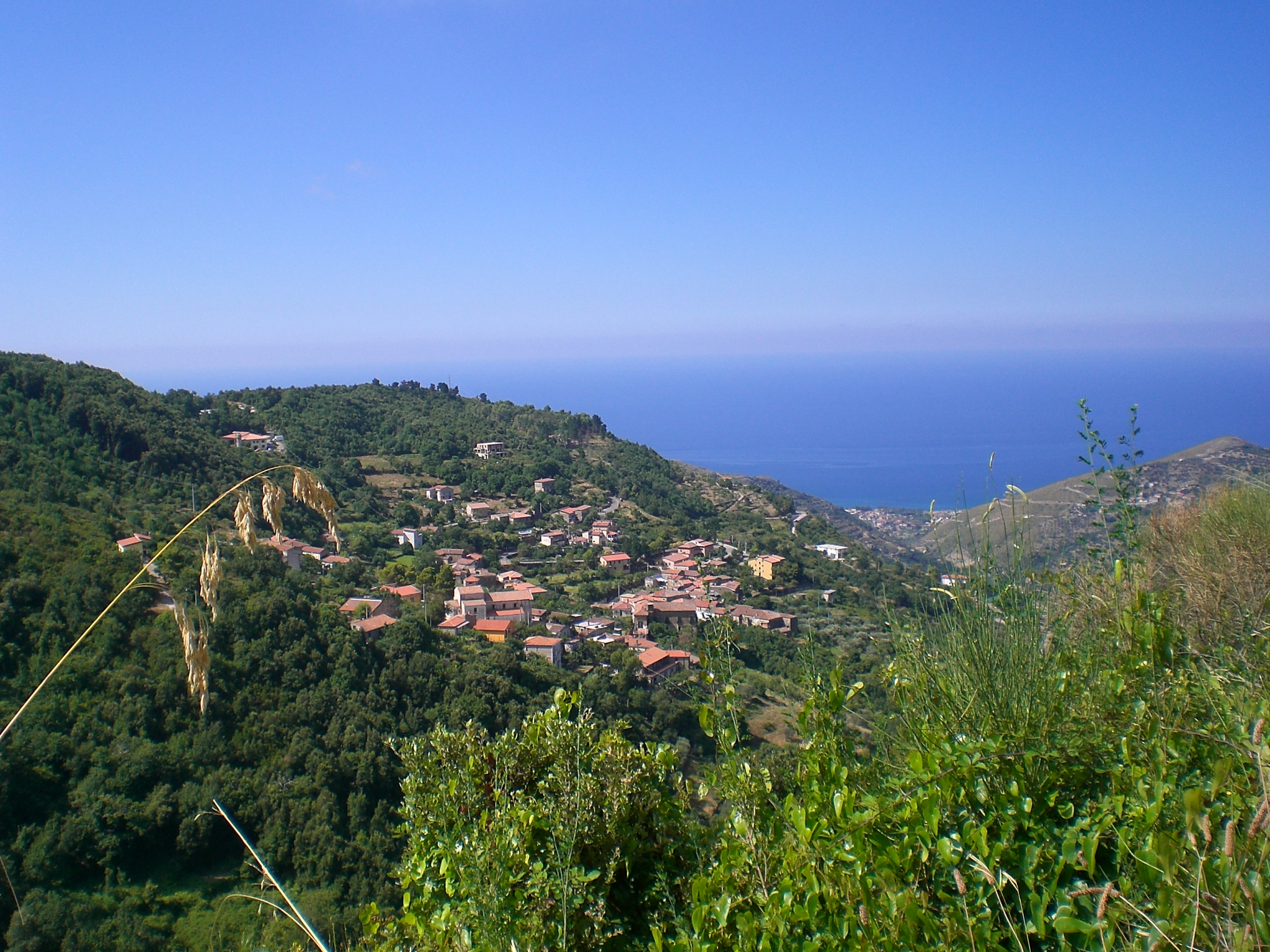

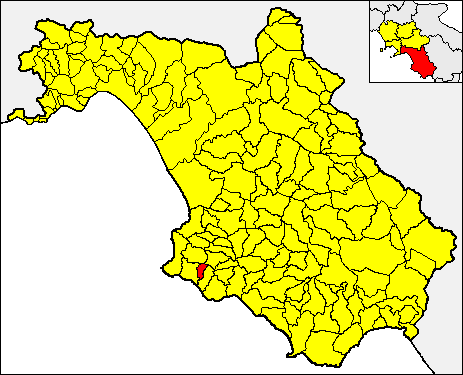
- Serramezzana within the Province of Salerno

- Location within Italy Location within Campania
- Coordinates: 40°15′N 15°1′E
- Country: Italy
- Region: Campania
- Province: Salerno (SA)
- Frazioni: Capograssi, San Teodoro

Government
  - Mayor: Anna Acquaviva Materazzi

Area
  - Total: 7.23 km^{2} (2.79 sq mi)
- Elevation: 520 m (1,710 ft)

Population (31 December 2010)
  - Total: 355
  - Density: 49.1/km^{2} (127/sq mi)
- Demonym: Serramezzanesi
- Time zone: UTC+1 (CET)
  - Summer (DST): UTC+2 (CEST)
- Postal code: 84,070
- Dialing code: 0,974
- ISTAT code: 065139
- Patron saint: San Filippo Apostolo
- Saint day: 3 May
- Website: Official website

Serramezzana is a town and comune in the province of Salerno in the Campania region of south-western Italy.

== Geography ==
Serramezzana is located in Cilento and borders with Montecorice, Perdifumo, San Mauro Cilento and Sessa Cilento. The municipality counts two hamlets (frazioni): Caporgrassi and San Teodoro. Serramezzana is home to a bed and breakfast by the name of "Scialá".
