= Pollica =

- Comune
- Comune di Pollica
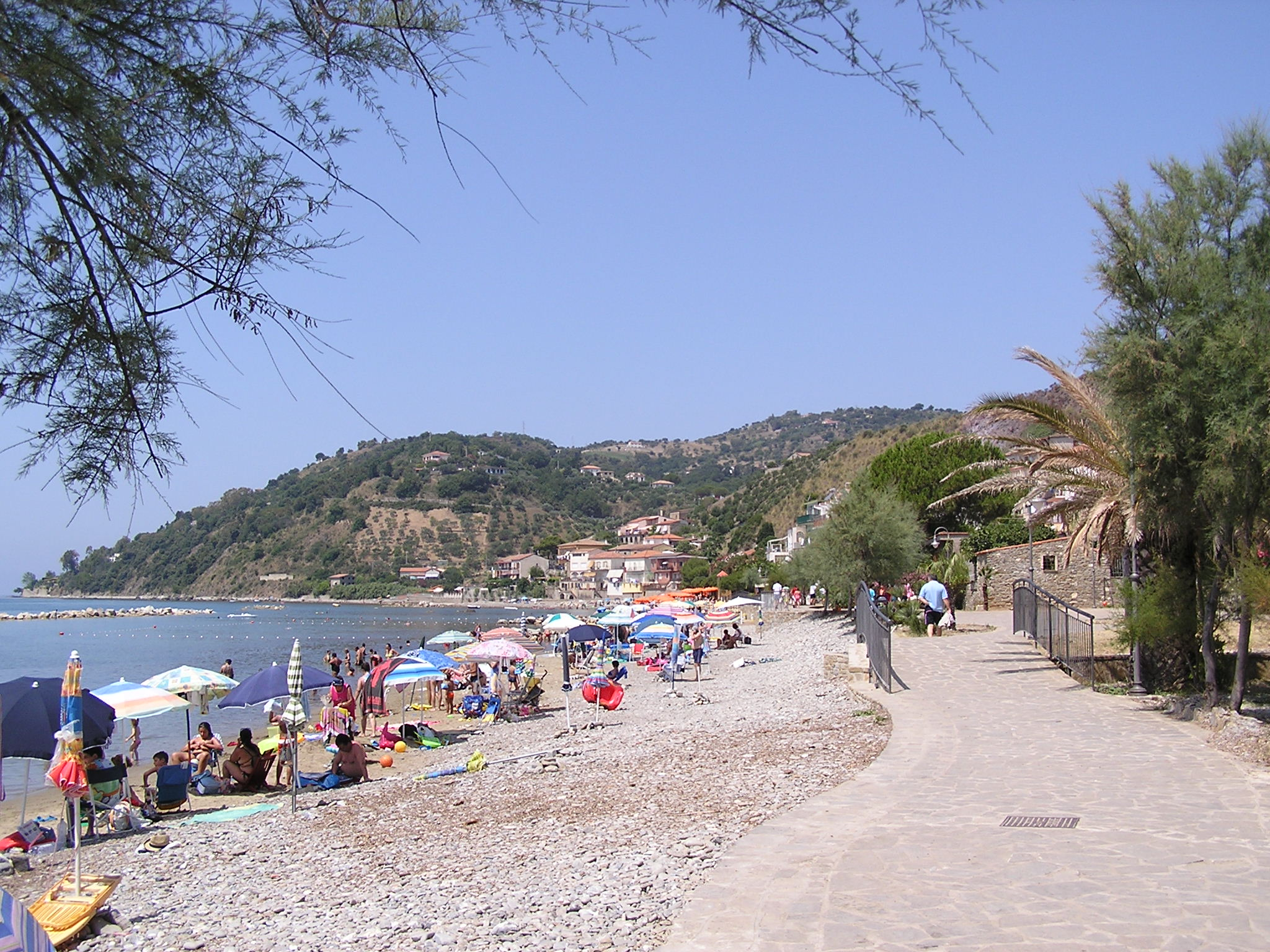
- Seaside of Pioppi in summer.

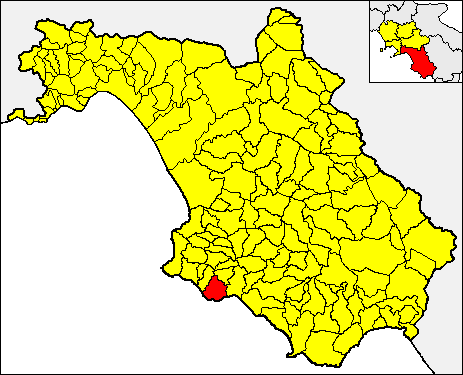
- Pollica within the Province of Salerno

- Location within Italy Location within Campania
- Coordinates: 40°11′N 15°03′E
- Country: Italy
- Region: Campania
- Province: Salerno (SA)
- Frazioni: Acciaroli, Cannicchio, Celso, Galdo Cilento, Pioppi

Government
  - Mayor: Stefano Pisani

Area
  - Total: 28.17 km^{2} (10.88 sq mi)
- Elevation: 280 m (920 ft)

Population (31 August 2015)
  - Total: 2,394
  - Density: 84.98/km^{2} (220.1/sq mi)
- Demonym: Pollichesi
- Time zone: UTC+1 (CET)
  - Summer (DST): UTC+2 (CEST)
- Postal code: 84060
- Dialing code: 0974
- Patron saint: San Nicola di Bari
- Saint day: -
- Website: Official website

Pollica (Campanian: Poddeca) is a town and comune in the province of Salerno in the Campania region of south-western Italy. Located 94 km from the city of Salerno, the town rises to an elevation 370 meters from sea level.

== History ==
The first mention of Pollica dates back to a legal document from 1113 in which Targisius II Sanseverino donated property to the Abbot of Cava. In the 13th century the town was owned by the Alemagna family, who sold it to the Capano family, originally from Rocca Cilento. The Capano princes governed the town until 1795, when the lineage ended without an heir. The town then became the property of the De Liguoro family, who held it until 1806 (end of the feudal system).

In 1997 the town purchased the "Castello Capano" (Capano's Castle). The castle dates back to the 12th century, but the current configuration is mostly due to work completed in 1610 by Vincenzo Capano XV, Prince of Pollica. The large square tower, built on three levels, dominates the town.

In 2010, on 6 September, the mayor of Pollica Angelo Vassallo was killed.

== Geography ==
Pollica borders with Casal Velino, San Mauro Cilento, Sessa Cilento and Stella Cilento.

Pollica has 5 frazioni (hamlets):

- Acciaroli - the largest, located by the sea, with a port.
- Pioppi - the other sea village, known for the studies of Ancel Keys over Mediterranean diet.
- Celso - a hill village between Pollica and Galdo.
- Galdo Cilento - a hill village between Celso and San Mauro Cilento.
- Cannicchio - a hill village between Acciaroli and Pollica.

== See also ==
- Cilento
- Cilentan Coast
