= Ascea =

- Comune
- Comune di Ascea
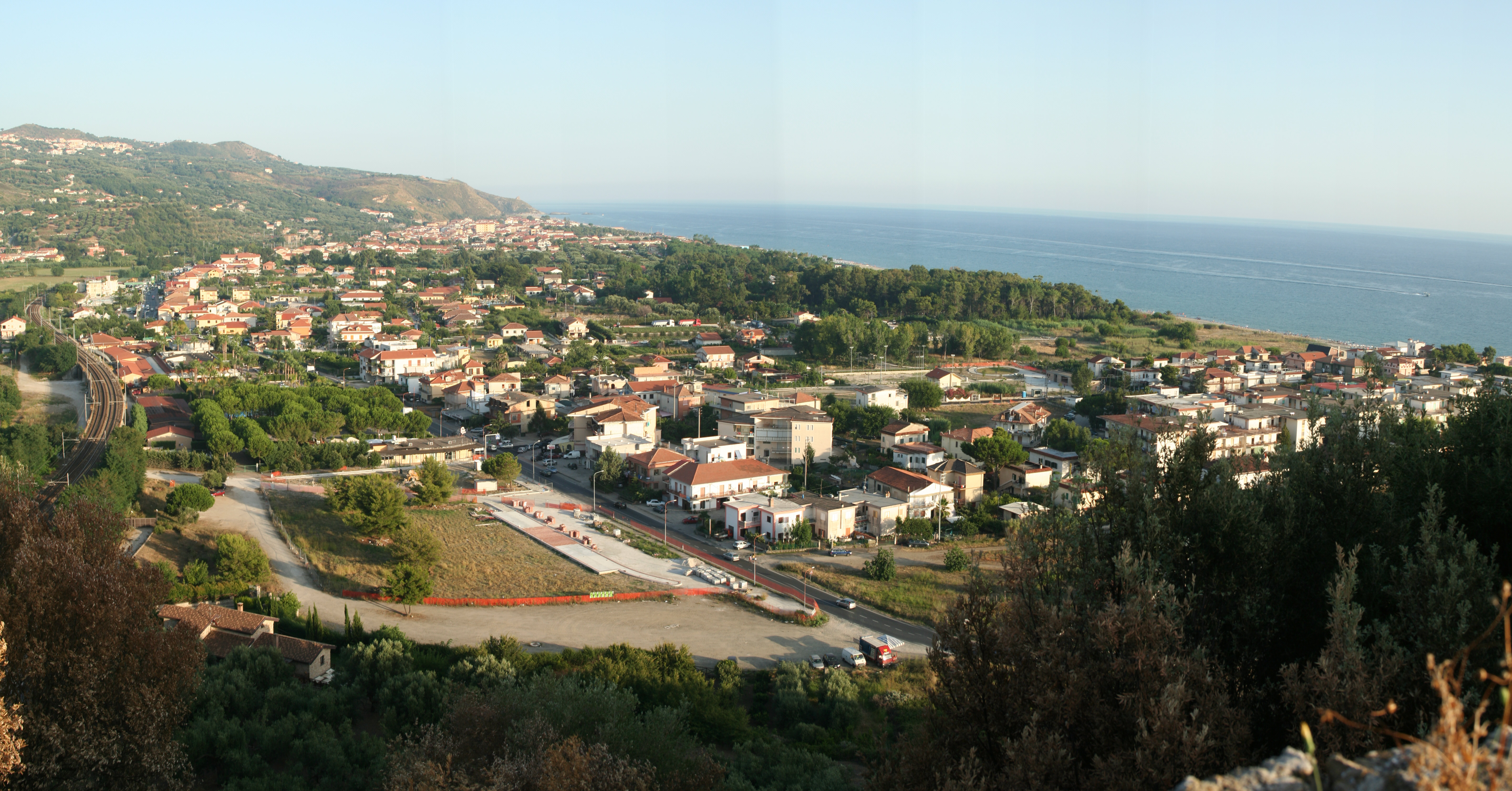
- Marina di Ascea.

- Coat of arms

- Location of Ascea in Italy Ascea (Campania)
- Coordinates: 40°09′N 15°11′E
- Country: Italy
- Region: Campania
- Province: Salerno
- Frazioni: Baronia, Catona, Mandia, Marina di Ascea, Salice, Stampella, Terradura, Velia

Government
  - Mayor: Pietro D'Angiolillo

Area
  - Total: 37.45 km^{2} (14.46 sq mi)
- Elevation: 225 m (738 ft)

Population (30 April 2017)
  - Total: 5,830
  - Density: 156/km^{2} (403/sq mi)
- Demonym: Asceoti
- Time zone: UTC+1 (CET)
  - Summer (DST): UTC+2 (CEST)
- Postal code: 84046
- Dialing code: 0974
- ISTAT code: 065009
- Patron saint: St. Nicholas of Bari
- Website: Official website

Ascea is a town and comune in the province of Salerno in the Campania region of southwestern Italy. In the communal territory are the Greek ruins of Velia. It is part of the Cilento traditional area; the maritime touristic part of the municipality is the Marina di Ascea. The town is located on the beach and is popular with European tourists in the summer months.

== See also ==
- Cilento
- Cilentan Coast
- Parmenides
- Elea
