= Velia =

Classical city ruins in Italy

- Velia (Latin); Ὑέλη, Ελέα (Ancient Greek)
- Hyele, Ele, Elea
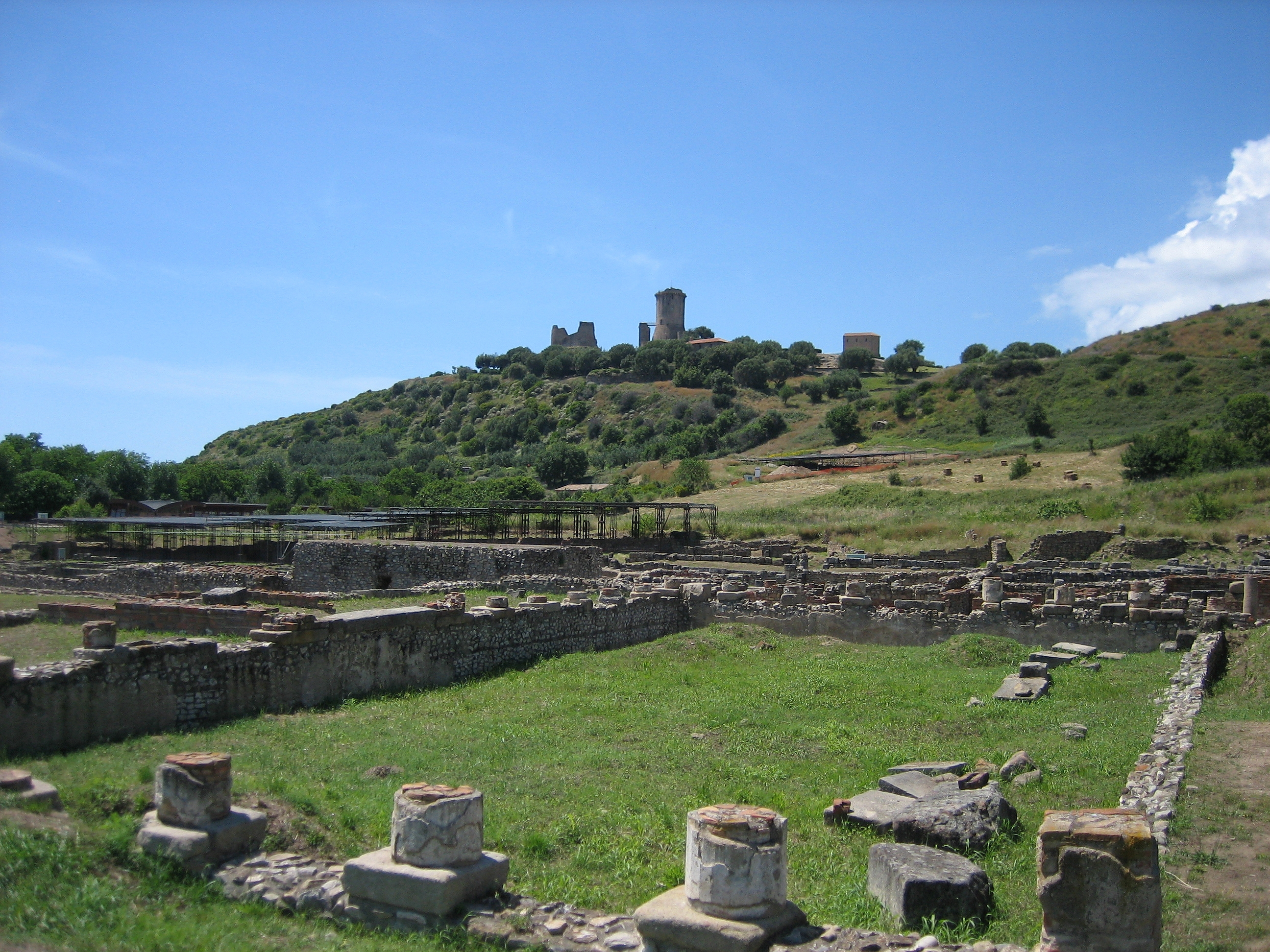
- View of the excavations and the tower at Velia

- Location within Italy
- 40°09′39″N 15°09′18″E
- Type: city
- Associated with: Parmenides, Zeno, Statius
- Location: Velia, Province of Salerno, Campania, Italy
- Region: Magna Graecia

History
- Built: Between 538 and 535 BC
- Built by: Settlers from Phocaea

Site notes
- Website: Parco archeologico di Elea-Velia (in Italian)

UNESCO World Heritage Site
- Official name: Cilento and Vallo di Diano National Park with the Archaeological Sites of Paestum and Velia, and the Certosa di Padula
- Type: Cultural
- Criteria: iii, iv
- Designated: 1998 (22nd session)
- Reference no.: 842
- Region: Europe and North America

Velia was the Roman name of an ancient city on the coast of the Tyrrhenian Sea. It is located near the modern village of Ascea in the Province of Salerno, Italy.

It was founded by Greeks from Phocaea as Hyele (Ancient Greek: Ὑέλη) around 538–535 BCE, which one scholar has suggested may be a feminine form of ὕελος "glass", an Ionic form of the usual ὕαλος. The name later changed to Ele and then Elea (/ˈiːliə/; Ancient Greek: Ἐλέα) before it became known by its current Latin and Italian name during the Roman era.

The city was known for being the home of the philosophers Parmenides and Zeno of Elea, as well as the Eleatic school of which they were a part.

== Geography ==
The site of the acropolis of ancient Elea was once a promontory called Castello a Mare, meaning "castle on the sea" in Italian. It now lies inland and was renamed Castellammare della Bruca in the Middle Ages. The city later developed on the coastal plain below.

== History ==
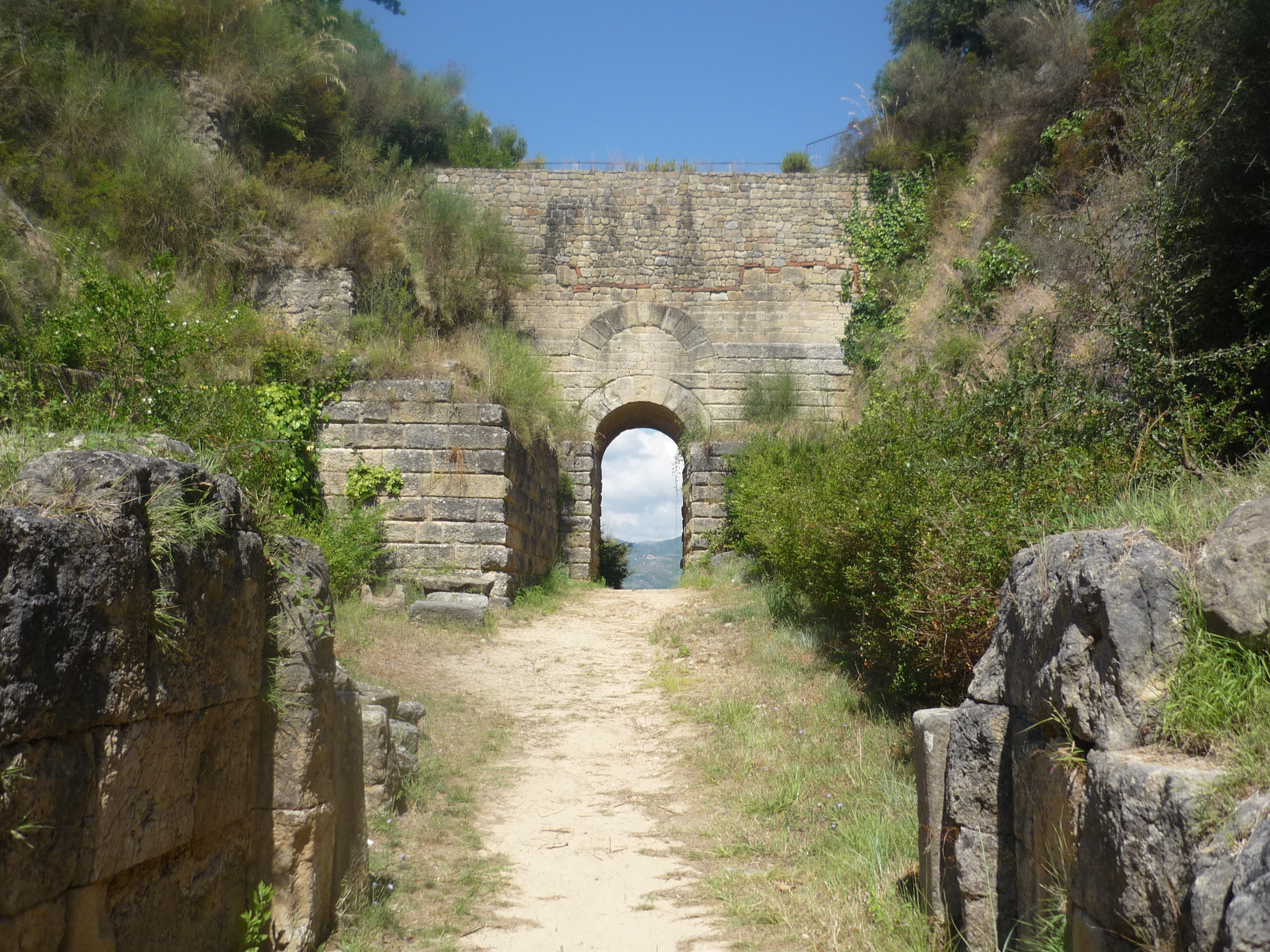
The Porta Rosa, of sandstone blocks, is a rare exemplar of a Greek arch, circa 4th century BC

According to Herodotus, in 545 BC Ionian Greeks fled Phocaea, in modern Turkey, which was being besieged by the Persians. After some wanderings (8 to 10 years) at sea, they stopped in Reggio Calabria, where they were probably joined by Xenophanes, who was at the time at Messina, and then moved north along the coast and founded the town of Hyele. According to Virgil, Velia is the place where the body of Palinurus washed ashore.

Around the 5th century BC, the city was known for its flourishing trade relations. It also took on considerable cultural importance for its pre-Socratic philosophical school, known as the Eleatic School, founded by Parmenides and carried forward by his student Zeno, famous for his paradoxes.

In the 4th century it entered the league of cities committed to stopping the advance of the Lucanians, who had already occupied nearby Poseidonia (Paestum) and were threatening Elea.

It joined an alliance with Rome in 273 BC and was included in the ancient province of Lucania. Elea had excellent relations with Rome: it supplied ships for the Punic wars (3rd-2nd century) and sent young priestesses for the cult of Demeter (Ceres), coming from the local aristocratic families. It became a holiday and health resort for Roman aristocrats, perhaps also thanks to the presence of the medical-philosophical school.

In 88 BC Elea was ascribed to the Romilia tribe, becoming a Roman municipium with the name of Velia, but with the right to maintain the Greek language and to mint its own coins. In the second half of the 1st century BC it served as a naval base, first for Brutus (44 BC) and then for Octavian (38 BC). The prosperity of the city continued until the end of the 1st century AD, when numerous villas and small settlements were built, together with new public buildings and thermae, but the progressive silting up of the port led the city to progressive isolation and impoverishment.

From the end of the imperial age, the last inhabitants were forced to take refuge in the upper part of the Acropolis to escape the advancement of marshy land.

== The site ==
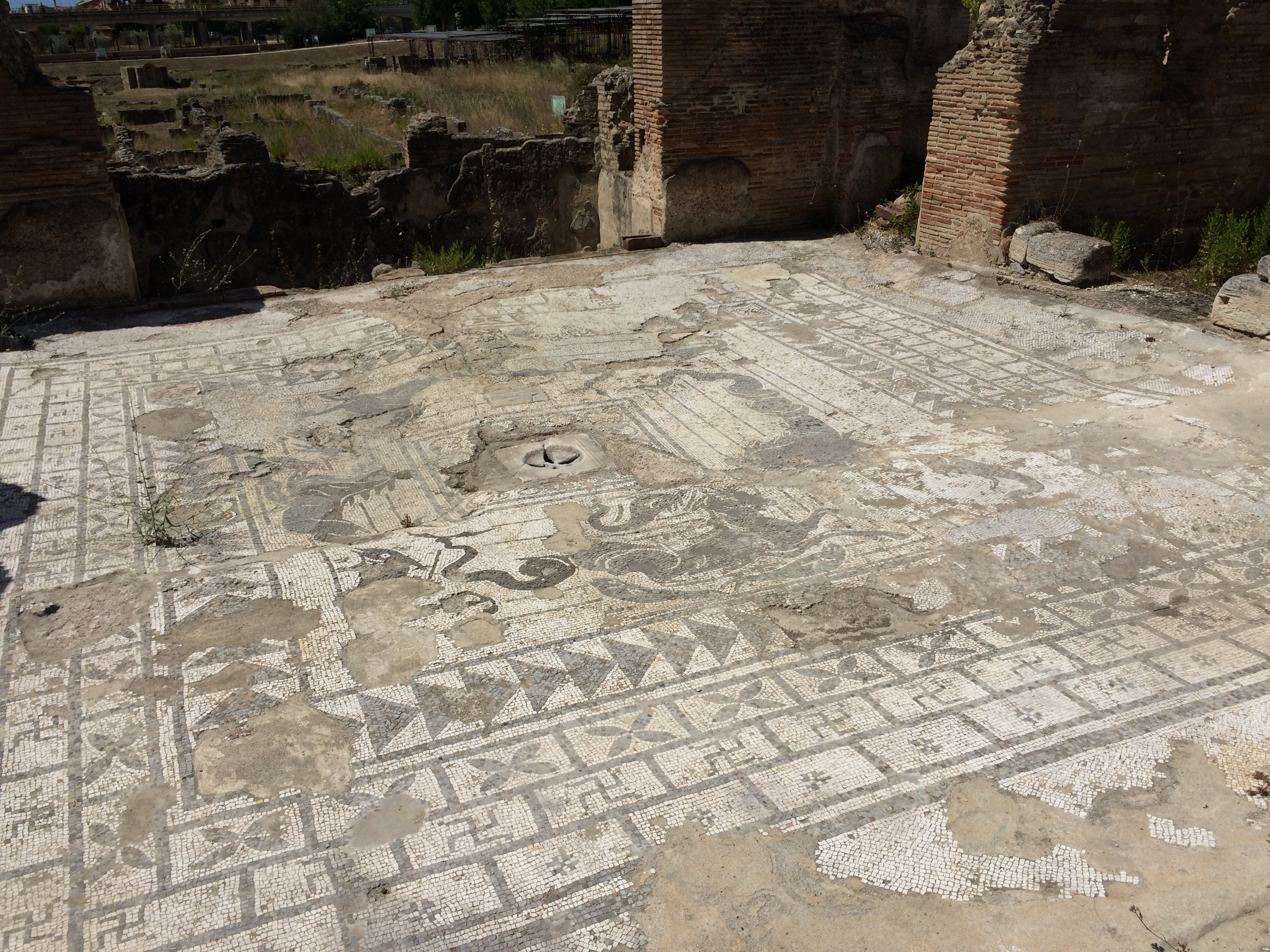
Roman baths

Remains of the city walls can be seen, with traces of one gate and several towers, of a total length of over three miles, and belong to three different periods, in all of which the local crystalline limestone is used.

Bricks with Greek brick-stamps were also employed in later times of a unique shape, each having two rectangular channels on one side.

There are remains of cisterns.

In 2022, excavations led to the discovery of the archaic temple of Athena on the acropolis of Velia. The oldest temple dates to 540-530 BC, the years following the battle of Alalia. Two well-preserved bronze Greek helmets with Etruscan design found there including metal fragments from weapons thought to be offerings to the goddess after the battle.

The temple visible today on the Acropolis dates to the Hellenistic period.

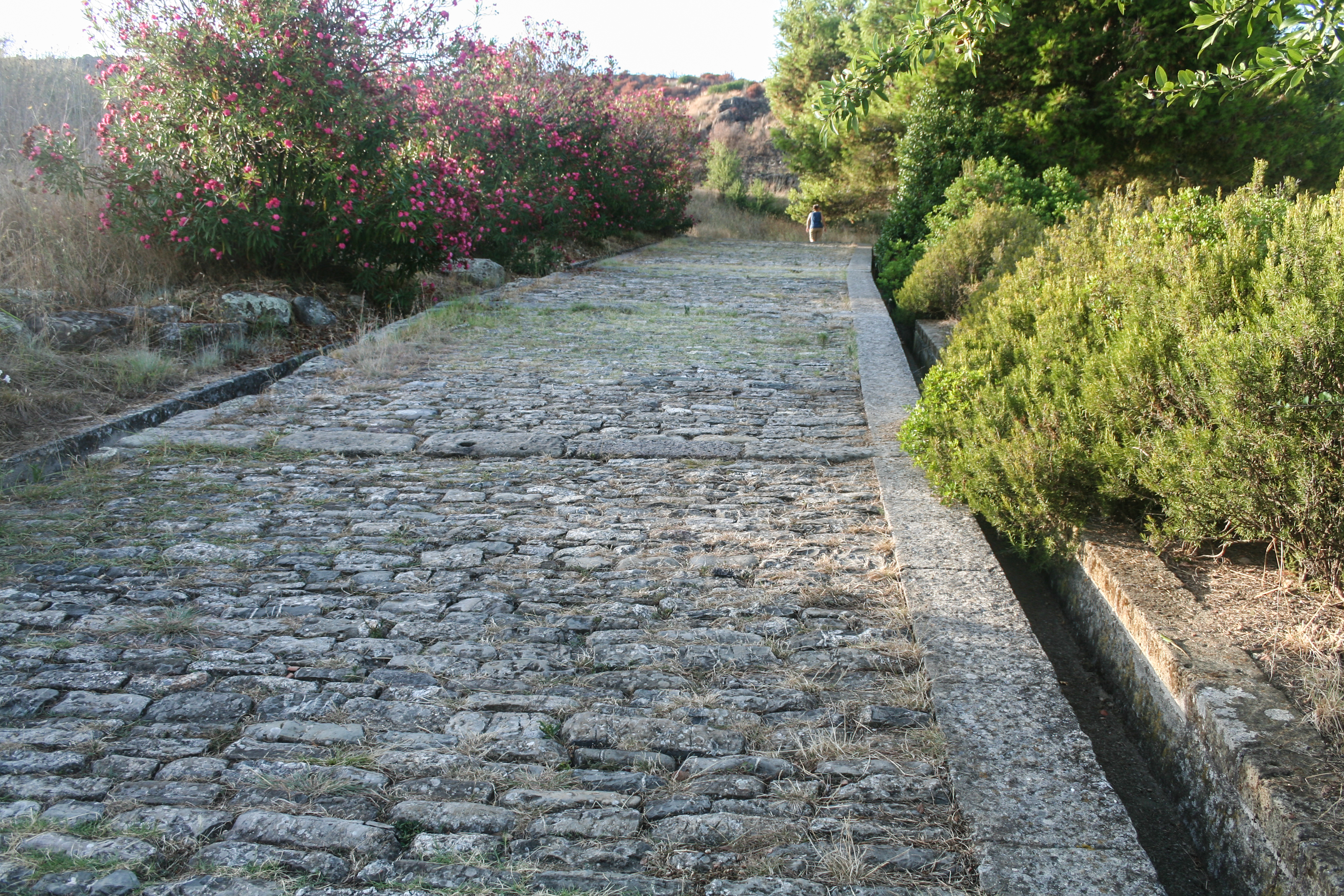
The Porta Rosa road was the main street of Elea, circa 4th-3rd centuries BC

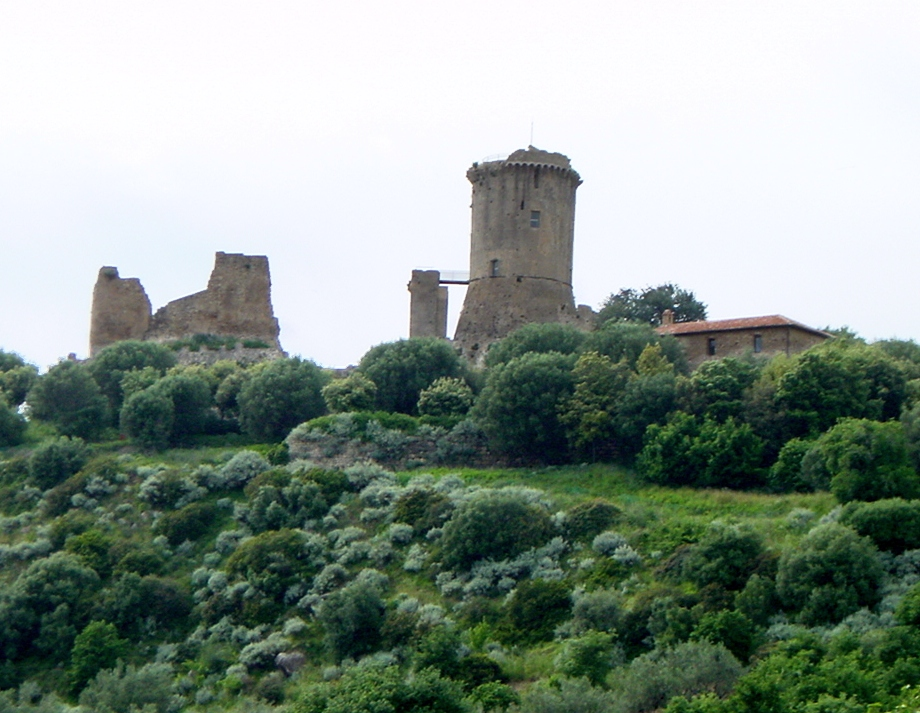
The medieval tower of Velia built out of a Greek temple

== Famous residents ==
- The father of the Roman poet Publius Papinius Statius was born in Hyele (Silv 5.3.127).
- Parmenides, philosopher and founder of the Eleatics
- Zeno of Elea, Eleatic philosopher known for his paradoxes

=== Coins ===
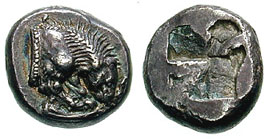
Drachma, circa 535-510 BC

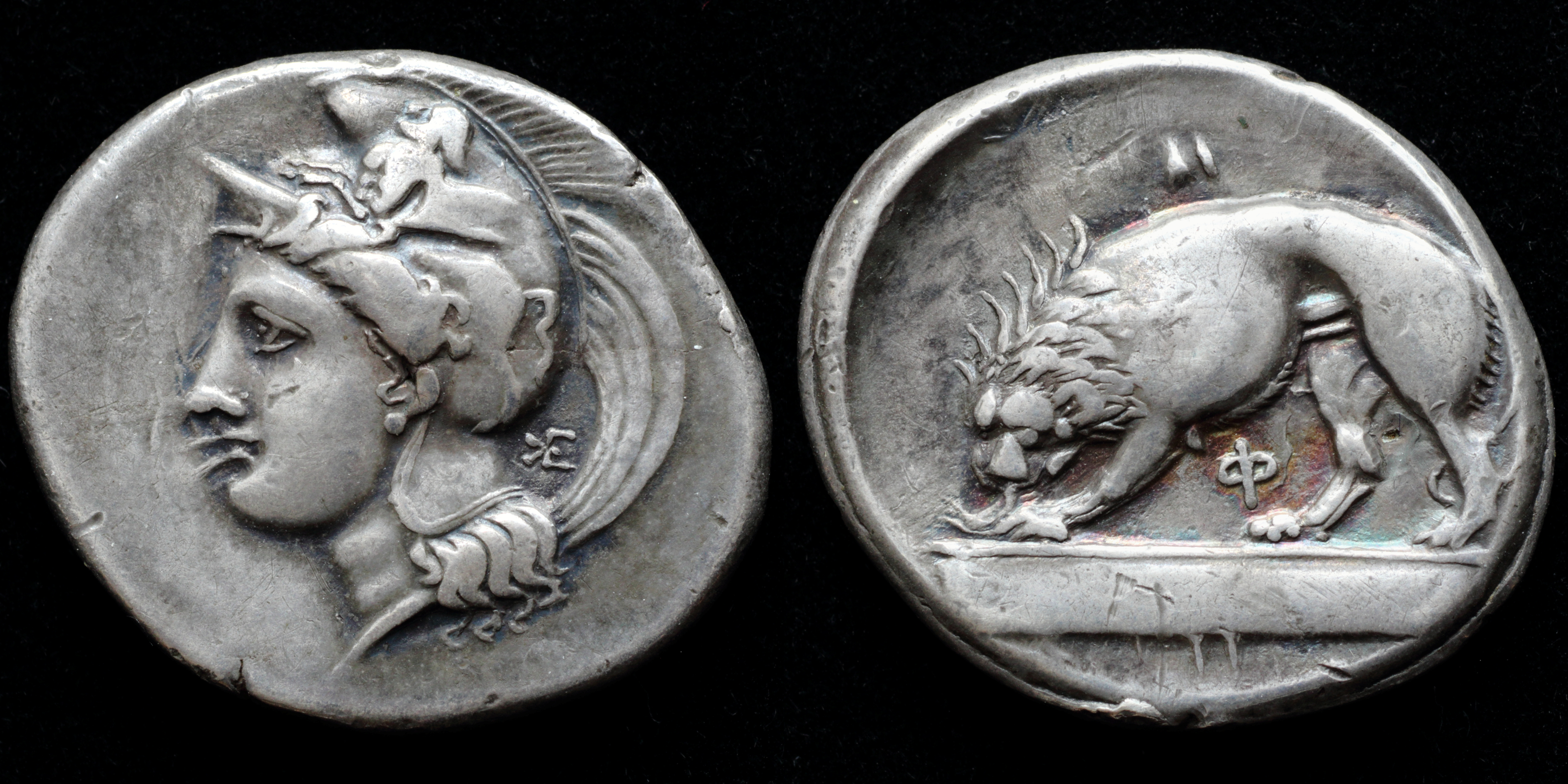
Stater struck 334-300 BC

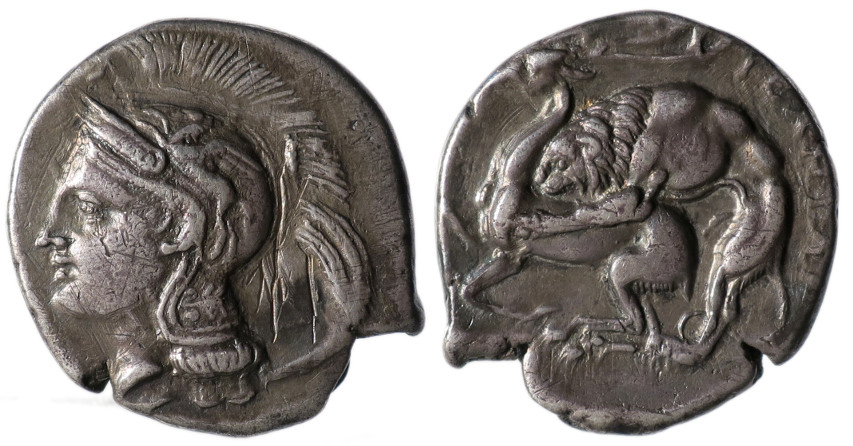
Silver coin from Velia, circa 280 BC, with Athena on the obverse, and a lion devouring a stag on the reverse

== See also ==
- List of ancient Greek cities
