= Licosa =

- Frazione
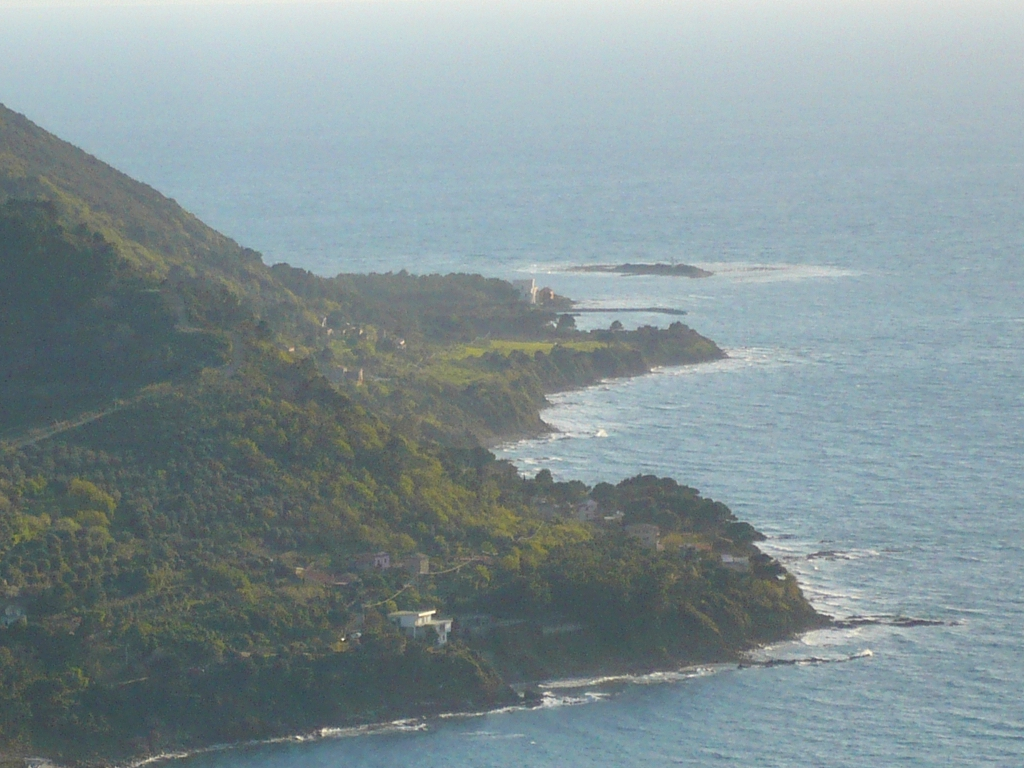
- View of the promontory and the island

- Location of Licosa in Italy
- Coordinates: 40°15′12″N 14°54′23″E
- Country: Italy
- Region: Campania
- Province: Salerno (SA)
- Comune: Castellabate
- Elevation: 20 m (66 ft)

Population (2009)
  - Total: 82
- Demonym: Leucosini / Licosani
- Time zone: UTC+1 (CET)
  - Summer (DST): UTC+2 (CEST)
- Postal code: 84048
- Dialing code: (+39) 0974

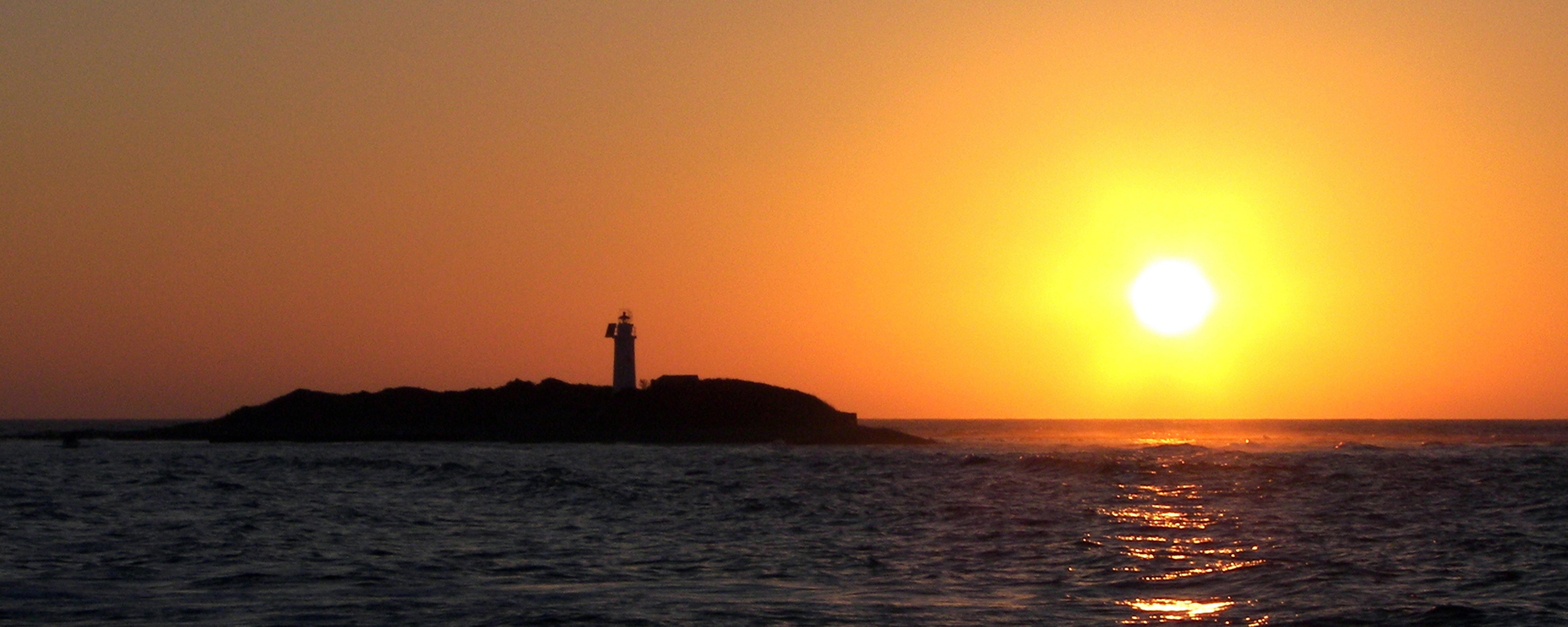
Sunset at Licosa Island

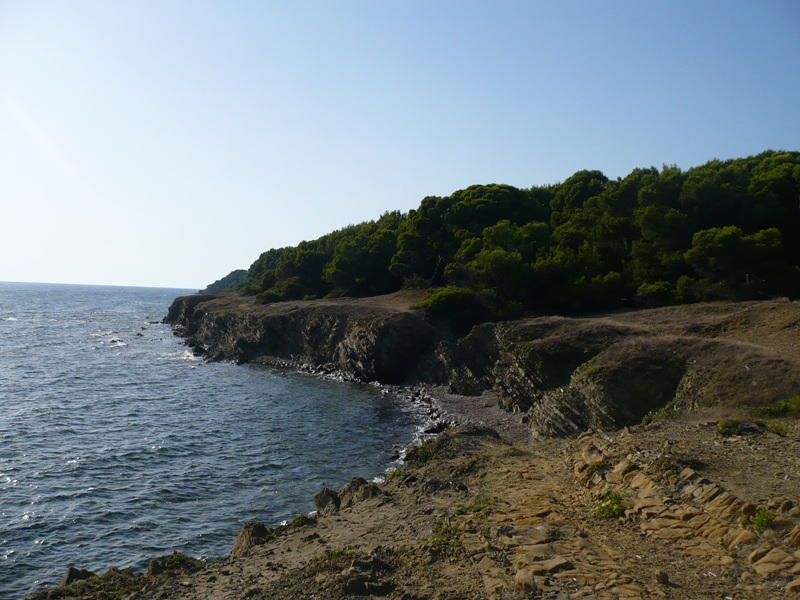
A beach of Licosa

Licosa is a southern Italian village and hamlet (frazione) of Castellabate, a municipality in the province of Salerno, Campania. As of 2009 its population was of 82.

== History ==
The toponym derives from the Greek word Λευκωσία (Leukosia, Lefkosía in Modern Greek), meaning "white". According to the ancient tradition it was named after Leucosia, one of the three mythological sirens met by Odysseus in the Odyssey. The toponym is therefore related to Nicosia (Greek: Lefkosía, Turkish: Lefkoşa), capital of Cyprus, and to Nicosia, a town in Sicily.

The area, inhabited since the Upper Paleolithic, was settled by Oenotrians, Lucani (Leukànoi), Greeks and Romans; as witnessed by the ruins of the ancient Greek city of Leucosia, or Leukothèa. In 846 it was the site of a naval battle between the Saracens and the Duchy of Naples with allies.

The medieval fief of Licosa, established by the abbot Constabilis in 1123, was part of the baronage of Castello dell'Abate, and was administered by the abbots of La Trinità della Cava.

== Geography ==
Licosa is located in northern Cilento, by the Tyrrhenian Coast, in a rural area and forest topped by Mount Licosa (326 m). The village, composed of 3 sections named Licosa I, Licosa II and Licosa III, lies nearby a cape named Punta Licosa. In front of the cape, that counts a little harbor, is located the Isola Licosa (Licosa Island), an islet that hosts a lighthouse.

The village, located between San Marco (3 km north) and Ogliastro Marina (4 km south), is 6 km far from Santa Maria, 7 from Castellabate, 8 from Case del Conte, 19 from Agropoli and 73 from Salerno.

== Natural environment ==
Licosa's territory belongs to the National Park of Cilento and its coastline, characterized by the flysch rocks, is part of the marine protected area of Santa Maria di Castellabate. The territory, far from urban settlements, is surrounded by maquis shrubland (macchia) and forest.

== Gallery ==
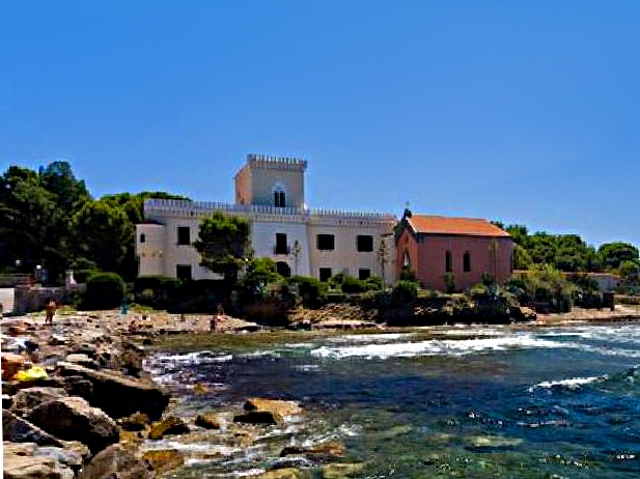
Palace Granito, nearby the island

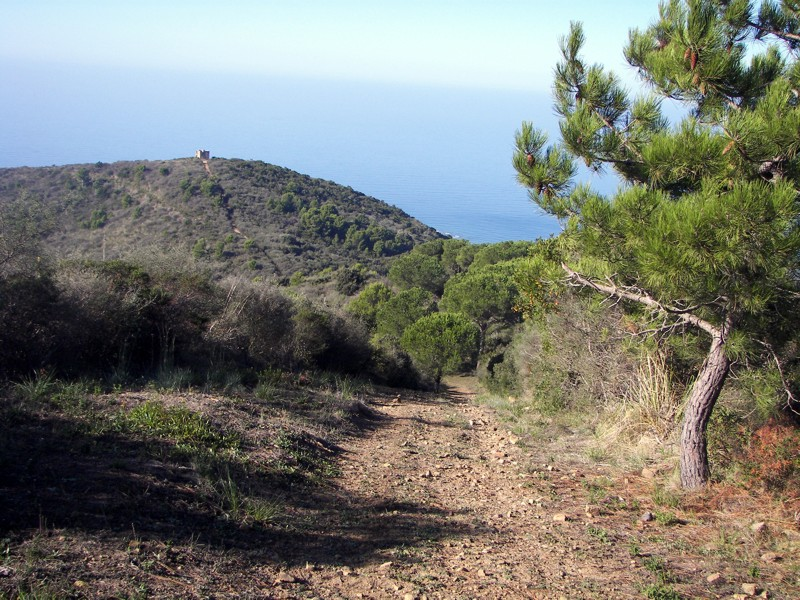
View of Mount Licosa trail to the coastal tower Semaforo

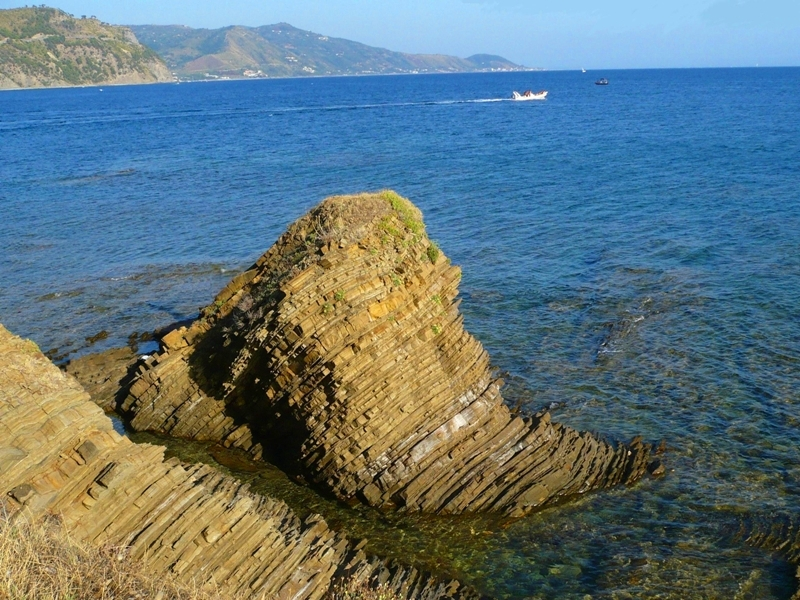
The flysch by the coast

== See also ==
- Cilentan Coast
- Cilentan dialect
- Cilento and Vallo di Diano National Park
