= Ogliastro Marina =

- Frazione
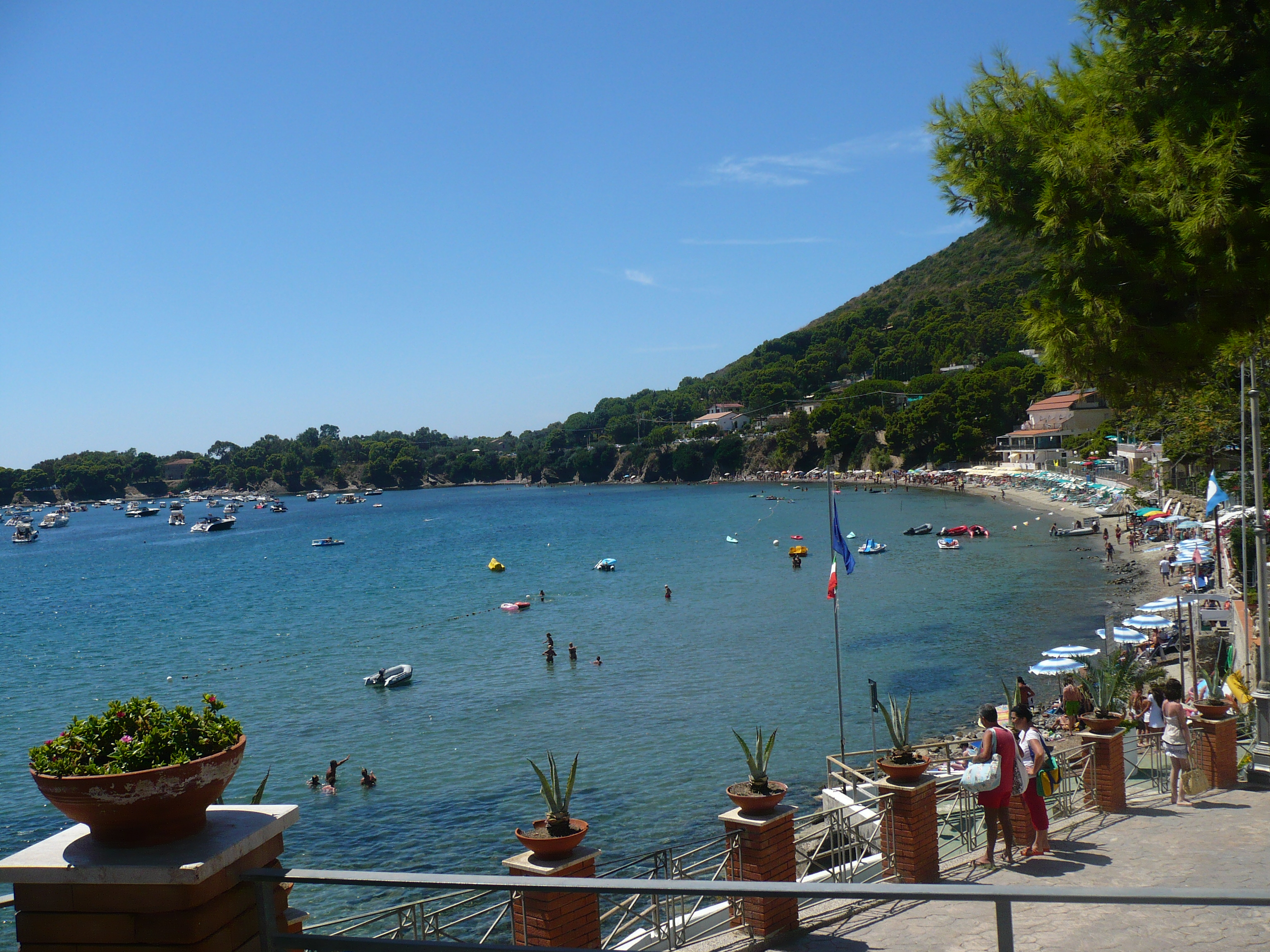
- The coastline with Licosa in background

- Location of Ogliastro Marina in Italy
- Coordinates: 40°14′3.41″N 14°56′39.26″E
- Country: Italy
- Region: Campania
- Province: Salerno (SA)
- Comune: Castellabate
- Elevation: 13 m (43 ft)

Population (2009)
  - Total: 172
- Demonym: Ogliastresi
- Time zone: UTC+1 (CET)
  - Summer (DST): UTC+2 (CEST)
- Postal code: 84048
- Dialing code: (+39) 0974
- Patron saint: St. Mary
- Saint day: 2 July

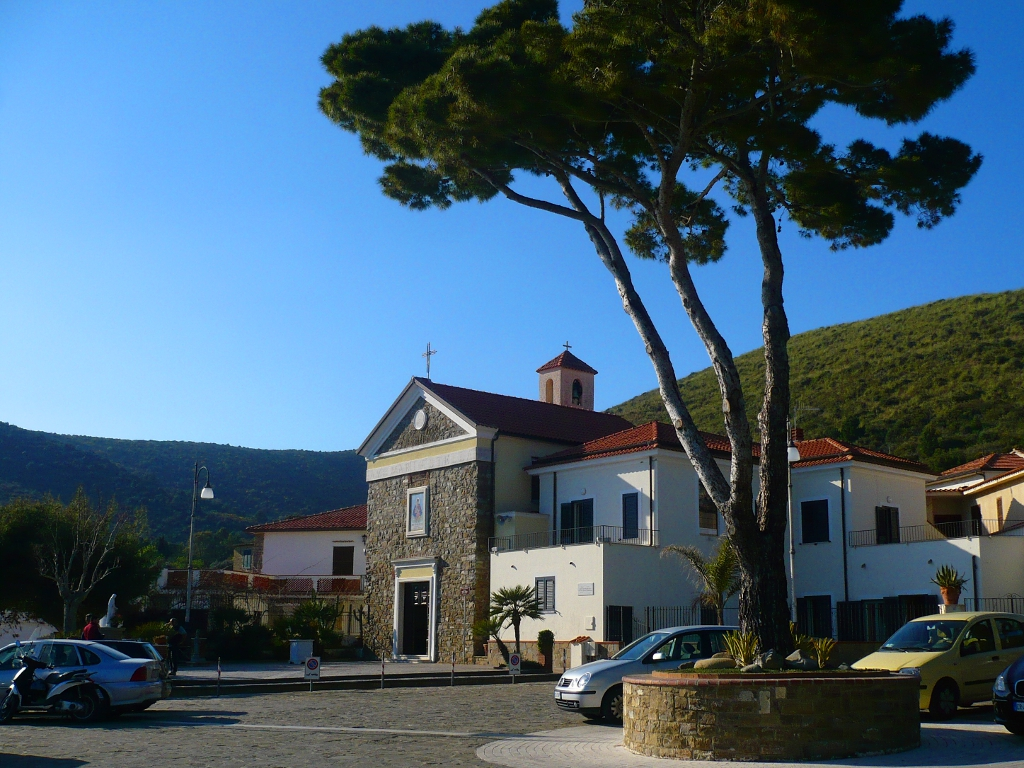
St. Mary's church

Ogliastro Marina, sometimes shortened as Ogliastro, is a southern Italian village and hamlet (frazione) of Castellabate, a municipality in the province of Salerno, Campania. As of 2009 its population was of 172.

== History ==
Originally mentioned as village, it became a farmhouse (casale) part of the baronage of Castello dell'Abate. It hosted a little port, named Olearola, owned by the Abbey of Cava de' Tirreni and used to trade with Sicily and North Africa.

== Geography ==
Ogliastro Marina is located in northern Cilento, along the Cilentan Coast by the Tyrrhenian Sea. It spans from the junction of the national highway SS 267 to the entrance of the natural area of Licosa. The village is divided from the nearby hamlet of Case del Conte (in the comune of Montecorice) by Rio dell'Arena river and shares with it a large beach. The settlement is divided into a pair of inhabited areas, named Baia dell'Arena (east) and Punta di Ogliastro (west), with a coastal park in the middle.

The village is 5 km far from San Marco, 7 from Santa Maria and Castellabate, 8 from Montecorice, 9 from Agnone and 20 from Agropoli.

== Natural environment ==
Ogliastro is surrounded by hills whose main vegetation is the maquis shrubland (macchia). In 2006 and 2012, the beach near Rio dell'Arena was the set of a rare naturalistic event: the egg-laying of a loggerhead sea turtle (caretta caretta).

== Gallery ==
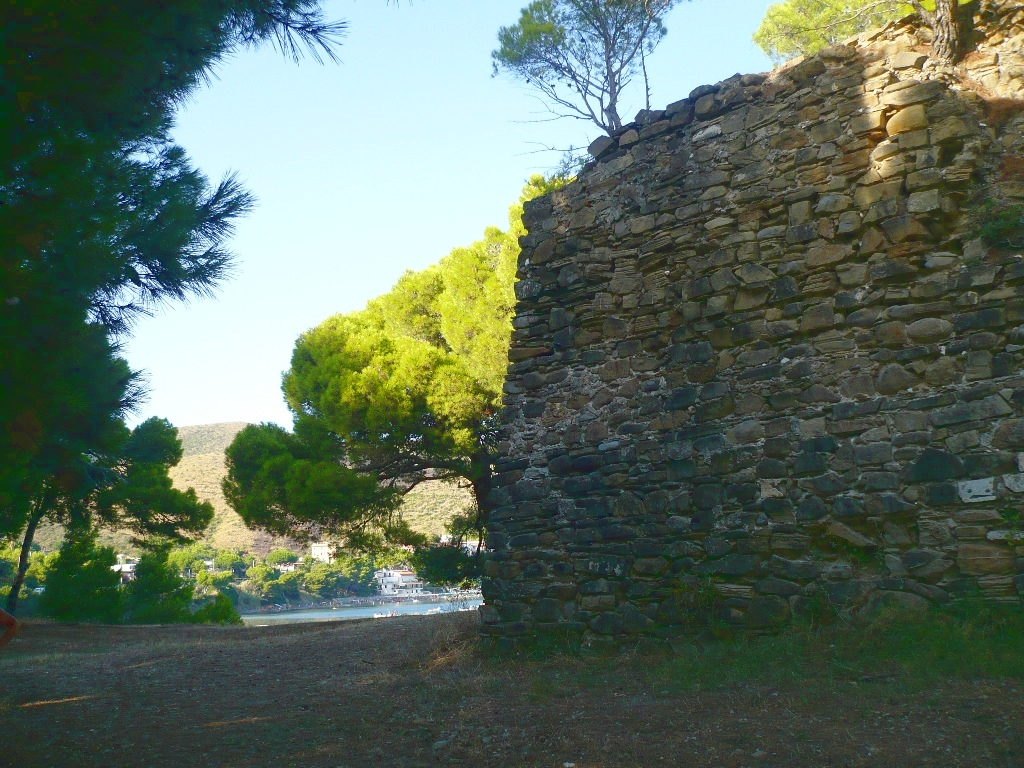
Ogliarola Tower

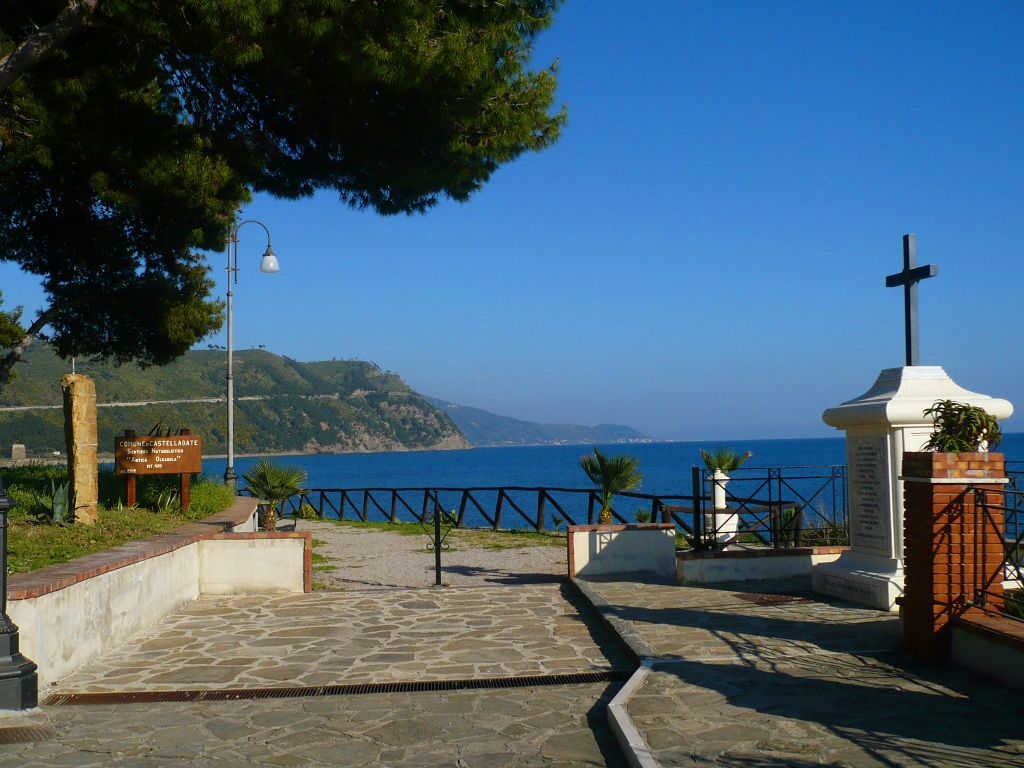
Beginning point of the trail of Olearola

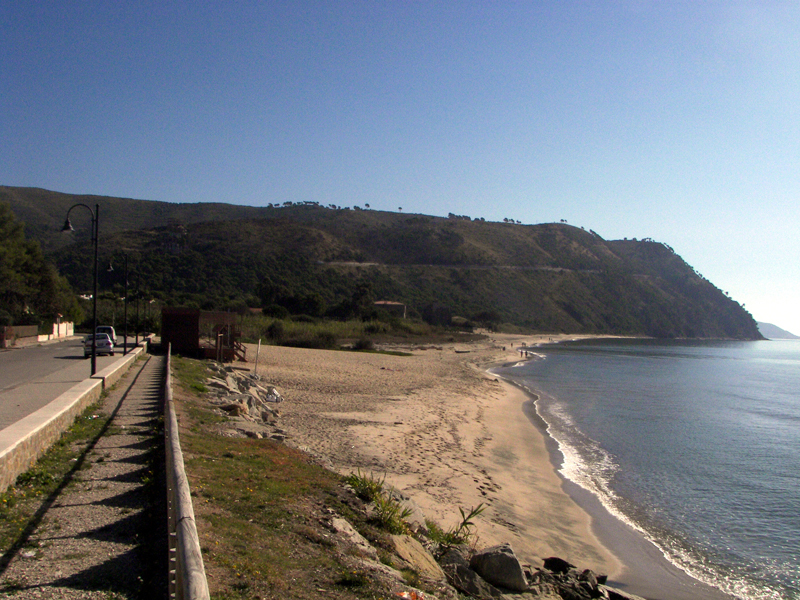
The beach of Ogliastro (left) and Case del Conte (right)

== See also ==
- Cilentan Coast
- Cilentan dialect
- Cilento and Vallo di Diano National Park
