= Ogliastro (disambiguation) =

Ogliastro may refer to:

- Ogliastro, a French municipality of the department of Haute-Corse, Corsica
- Ogliastro (Maratea), an Italian locality of Maratea, Basilicata
- Ogliastro Cilento, an Italian municipality of the Province of Salerno, Campania
- Ogliastro Marina, an Italian village and hamlet of Castellabate, Campania

== See also ==
- Ogliastra, an Italian province of Sardinia
