= Norman Castle of Ariano Irpino =

Caslte in Ariano Irpino, Italy

- Castello normanno di Ariano Irpino
- Ariano Irpino, Campania, Italy

Site information
- Type: Castle
- Open to the public: yes

Location
- Coordinates: 41°09′15.23″N 15°05′41.02″E

The Norman castle of Ariano Irpino (Italian: castello normanno di Ariano Irpino) stands on the top of the hill of the same name, in the highest and most panoramic part of the town, at an altitude of 811 m. Built in a strategic and not easily accessible point, in a dominant position with respect to the Ariano saddle (the main pass of the Campanian Apennines), the castle towers over the valleys of Ufita, Miscano, and Cervaro.

== History ==
The date of the castle's foundation is uncertain; a document from 892, kept in the abbey of Cava de' Tirreni, however, attests to its existence already at the time of the Lombards, presumably in an anti-Byzantine function; in fact, a certain Teodemario (Latinized variant of the name of Germanic origin Teodemaro) resided there, habitator intus Arian castle.

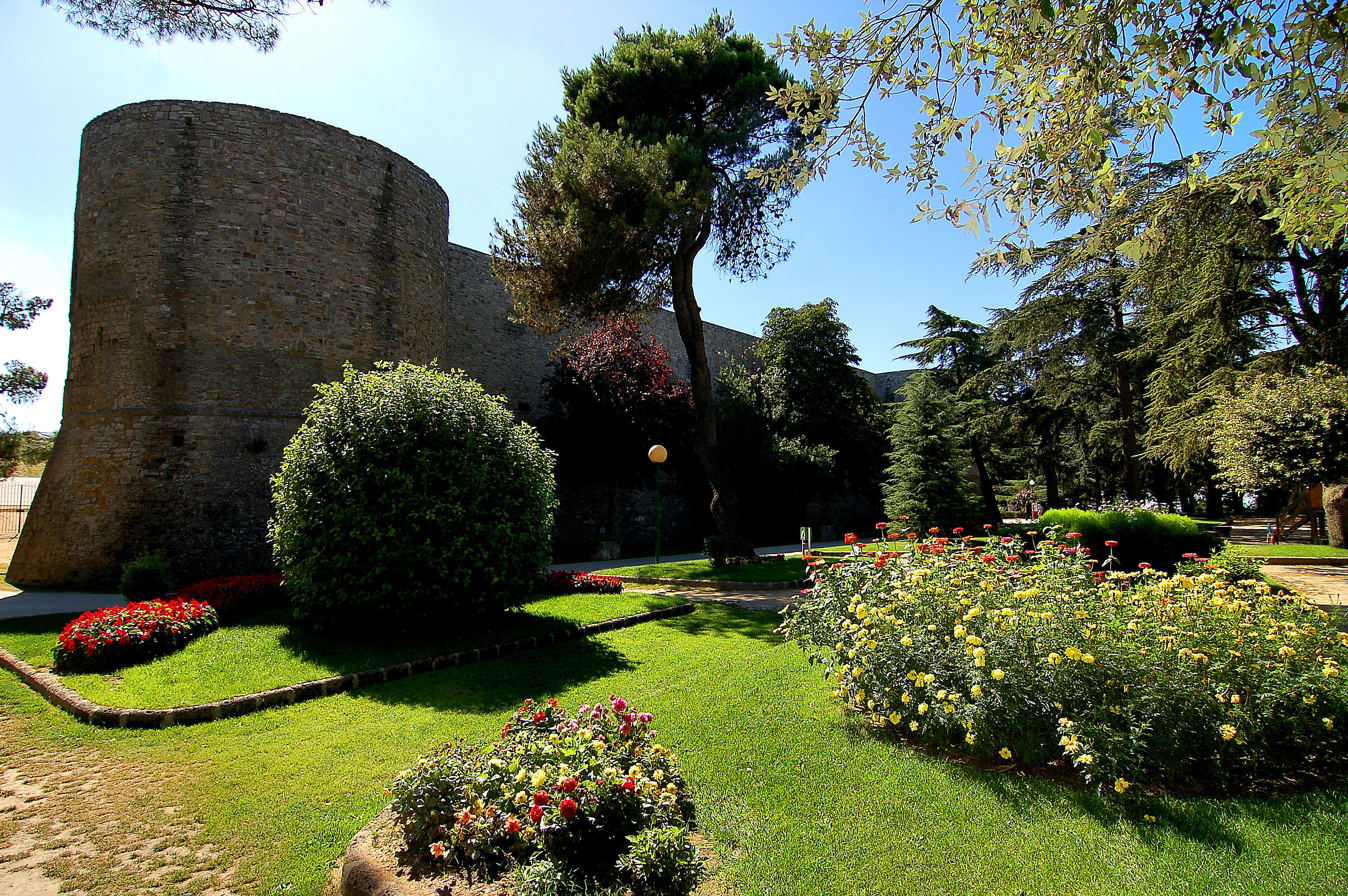
A glimpse of the north-east tower, immersed in the greenery of the municipal villa municipal villa

== Archaeology ==
During some surveys carried out in the castle towards the end of the twentieth century, several ancient coins were also found, all dating back to a historical period between the second half of the thirteenth century and the first half of the sixteenth century.

== Bibliography ==
- Castelli Medievali in Irpinia. Memoria e conoscenza. Napoli: ArtstudioPaparo. 2017. pp. 133–136. ISBN 978-88-99130-43-5.
- Gabriele Grasso (1900). Il Castello di Ariano. Ariano di Puglia: Stabilimento Tipografico Appulo-Irpino. ISBN 978-1161202663.
- Flammia, Nicola (1893). Storia della città di Ariano. Ariano di Puglia. OCLC 886285390.
- Nicola Busino (2010). "Castello di Ariano Irpino. Ricerche Archeologiche 1988-94, 2008" (PDF). Quaderni di Archeologia Medievale (11). Palermo: Officina di Studi Medievali: 139–166. ISBN 978-88-6485-008-5.
- Tommaso Vitale (1794). Storia della regia città di Ariano e sua diocesi. Roma: Stamperia Salomoni.
