= Case del Conte =

- Frazione
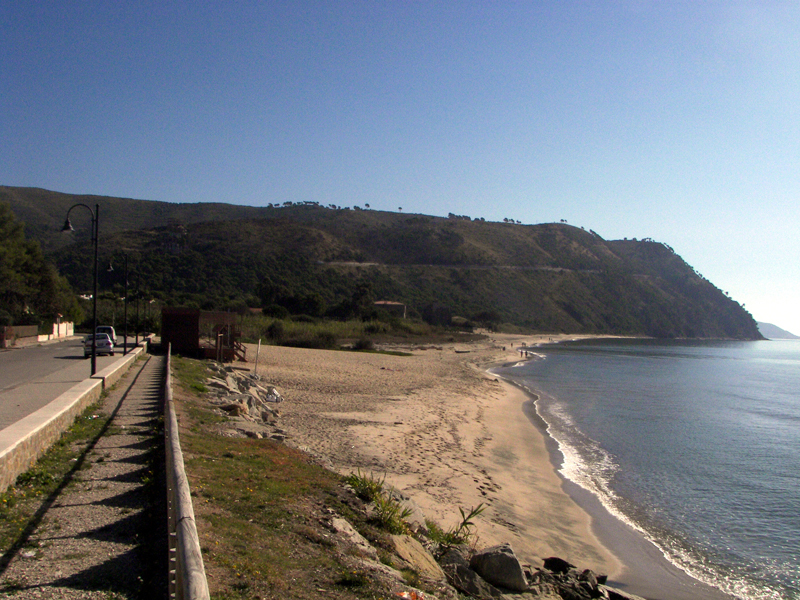
- The beach of Case del Conte (right) seen from the nearby Ogliastro Marina (left)

- Location of Case del Conte in Italy
- Coordinates: 40°14′13.49″N 14°57′51.01″E
- Country: Italy
- Region: Campania
- Province: Salerno (SA)
- Comune: Montecorice
- Elevation: 25 m (82 ft)

Population (2009)
  - Total: 235
- Demonym: Contisani
- Time zone: UTC+1 (CET)
  - Summer (DST): UTC+2 (CEST)
- Postal code: 84060
- Dialing code: (+39) 0974
- Patron saint: St. Paschal Baylon
- Saint day: 17 May

Case del Conte, sometimes also spelled Casa del Conte, is a southern Italian village and hamlet (frazione) of Montecorice, a municipality in the province of Salerno, Campania. As of 2009 its population was of 235.

== History ==
The toponym means "Count's houses" in Italian, and refers to village's origins, linked to the Counts Matarazzo, owners of the original lodge and the surrounding rural area.

== Geography ==
Case del Conte is located in northern Cilento, at the municipal borders of Castellabate, separated from its hamlet Ogliastro Marina (2 km far) by the Rio dell'Arena river. It extends along the national highway SS 267, from the zone Pietà to Arena, in which is located the beach.

The village is part of the Cilentan Coast, by the Tyrrhenian Sea, and is 4 km far from San Marco and Montecorice, 7 from Santa Maria and Agnone, 8 from Castellabate, 11 from Acciaroli and 18 from Agropoli. It counts two hill localities, named Mainolfi (or Mainolfo) and Giungatelle, on the provincial road linking it to Perdifumo (9 km far).

== See also ==
- Cilentan dialect
- Cilento and Vallo di Diano National Park
