= Benedict of Bari =

Italian Benedictine monk (12th–13th century)

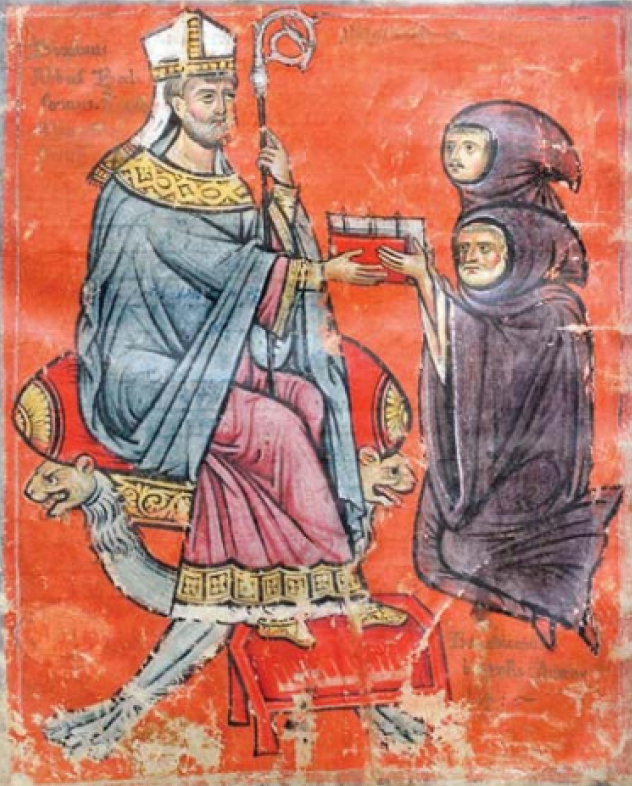
Benedict (old and young in one) presenting his book to Abbot Balsamon.

Benedict of Bari (c. 1150 – 1220?), Italian Benedetto da Bari, Latin Benedictus Barensis, was a Benedictine monk of Santissima Trinità della Cava dei Tirreni who wrote the Christian theological treatise De septem sigillis (On the Seven Seals). This is the only major work of theology written at La Cava.

Benedict was a native of Bari. He identifies himself as Barensis dictus, "called the Bariot". He was probably born early in the second half of the 12th century. He wrote De septem sigillis between 1208 and 1232. According to a later note discovered by Jean Mabillon, it was completed around 1227. A 19th-century abbot, however, reported an entry for Benedict in the abbey's necrology for 1220.

De septem sigillis survives in a single illustrated manuscript in Beneventan script kept at La Cava (Cavensis 18). It may be Benedict's autograph. It contains a miniature, perhaps also by Benedict himself, depicting the author handing a copy of his work to his abbot, who is depicted mitred and seated on a chair. The author is depicted advanced in age with a younger man's head imposed above him. This single double-headed figure is probably intended to represent the author when he began and when he finished. De septem sigillis is the product of a lifetime. The caption identifies the abbot as Balsamon.

De septem sigillis is divided into six books subdivided into 361 chapters. The six books are:

- De incarnatione Verbi (On the Incarnation of the Word)
- De circumcisione et baptismo (On Circumcision and Baptism)
- De passione et morte (On Suffering and Death)
- De resurrectione Christi (On the Resurrection of Christ)
- De ascensione et adventu Spiritus (On the Ascension and the Advent of the Spirit)
- De misterio resurrectionis et forma iudicii (On the Mystery of the Resurrection and Judicial Forms)

Benedict is not systematic in his approach. His work covers the Bible, theology, morality and asceticism. His writing is elegant, his Latinity good and he incorporates several songs. He may have been influenced by Joachim of Fiore. His handling of the Book of Revelation is notable for its clarity.

== Editions ==
- Giuseppe Micunco (ed.), I setti sigilli, Per la Storia della Chiesa di Bari-Bitonto, Vol. 32 (Edipuglia, 2018).
