= Peter of Pappacarbone =

Italian priest (died 1123)

Saint Peter of Pappacarbone
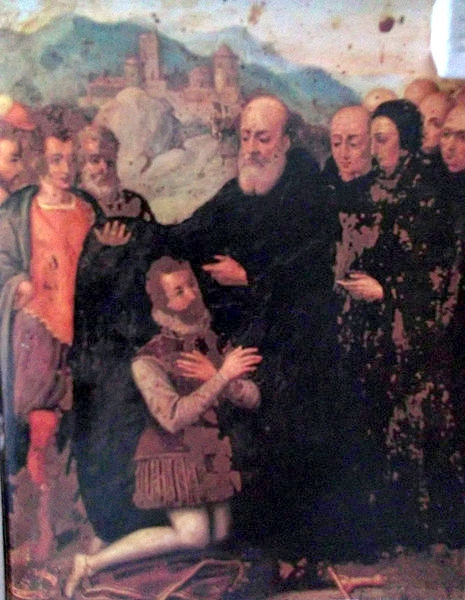
- Roger Sanseverino prostrates himself at the feet of St. Peter Pappacarbone

Bishop of Policastro
- Born: Salerno
- Died: 4 March 1123
- Venerated in: Roman Catholic Church
- Canonized: cultus confirmed in 1893 by Leo XIII
- Feast: 4 March

Peter of Pappacarbone (Italian: San Pietro di Pappacarbone) (died 4 March 1123) was an Italian abbot, bishop, and saint. He was abbot of La Trinità della Cava, located at Cava de' Tirreni. Born in Salerno, he had first been a monk at Cava under Leo I of Cava. He then was at Cluny from 1062 to 1068 and later became bishop of Policastro in 1079.

He later resigned his see and returned to Cava. Abbot Leo I appointed him coadjutor. When Peter became abbot himself, his administration was so strict that he caused strife in the abbey. He thus withdrew temporarily before being recalled and serving for several decades as abbot until his death. He was succeeded by Constabilis, who had served as Peter's coadjutor.

== Veneration ==
The first four abbots of Cava were officially recognized as saints on December 21, 1893, by Pope Leo XIII. The first four abbots are Alferius (Alferio), the founder and first abbot (1050); Leo I (1050–79); Peter of Pappacarbone (1079–1123); and Constabilis.
