= Harald Winter =

German painter (born 1953)

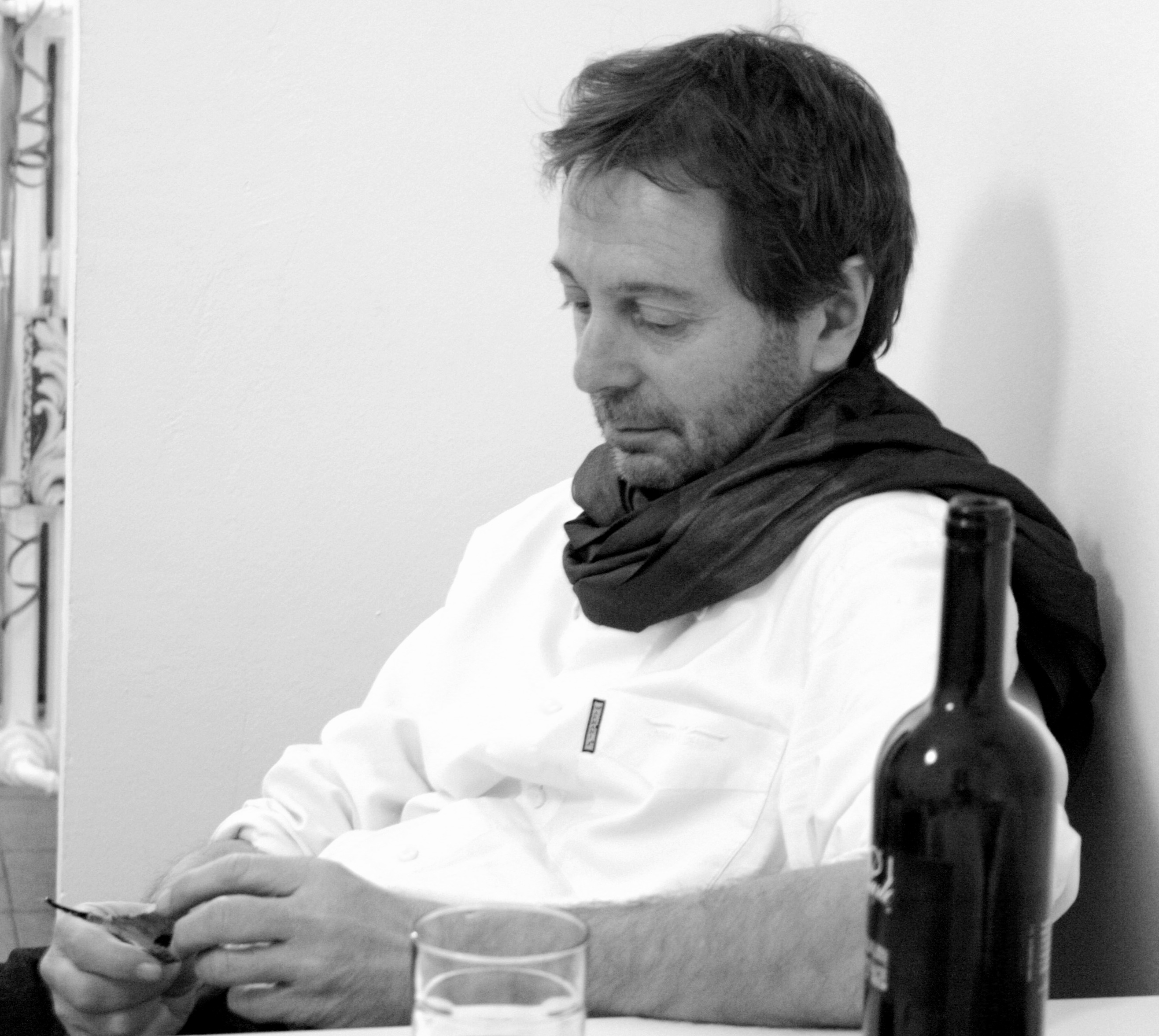
Harald Winter

Harald Winter (born in 1953), is a Bavarian artist who works in the fields of drawing, painting, sculpting, and performance.

== Life ==
Harald is a native of Herrsching am Ammersee, west of Munich, Bavaria.

After his Abitur, the final secondary school examinations in 1973, he entered the Nuremberg Academy of Arts (“Akademie der Bildenden Künste Nürnberg”) and completed his studies in 1978. He lives in the countryside near Nuremberg, Germany, and has a secondary residence in Berlin, Germany and Castellabate, Italy. His picture "Neun Leute aus der Provinz/ Countryfolk" (oil on canvas, 350 cm/200 cm, 1981) was attracting a first attention during the presentation in Munich, Haus der Kunst, Kunstsalon in 1982.

Initiated by the Italian Consulate General of Geneva and the Italian Embassy, a large exhibition of his works was opened at the United Nations Palais des Nations in Geneva, Switzerland in January 2010.

In the year 2011 he was presented with an award for culture (Forchheimer Kulturpreis - 2011) and he also won the European Art Competition, 2019 for his design of a roundabout art in Germany (Kersbacher Kreuz)

== Works ==
- As things stand, oil on canvas,2016, actual size: 145 cm/300 cm, Norbayerische Nachrichten,
- Portrait of Dr. Amedeo Colella, neapolitan writer, crayon on handmade paper, 2007, actual size: 75 cm/54 cm, collection Colella
- Invecchiarano insieme, water colour on handmade paper, 2001, actual size: 54/37 cm, collection Colella
- Sonntagsausflug, oil on canvas, 1990, actual size: 420/210 cm, collection Dr. Hawranek

== Castellabate project ==
The Castellabate project is a continuing project without any commercial aspect; the pictures are not in trade. In this portrait the artist tries to unveil also the changes. 18 years ago in 1998 the project started. A first interim report was shown in 2001 at Naples, Goethe Institut, supported by the Institut für Auslandsbeziehungen, a second show in 2007 at the Castello of Castellabate, supported by the German Consulate of Napels. This idea was the reason for the United Nations to present the show Le petit tour (2010).

=== Reviews ===
- portarosa
- il giornale del cilento:
- Fränkischer Tag:
- Nordbayrische Nachrichten:

== topsy-turvy ==
Layered in both their physical style and the subject matter they address, Harald Winter's works are amalgamations of fragmented ideas and free thoughts, overlapping each other, building layers of meaning. At first glace they may seem playful, yet on closer inspection of the individual works, they are witty and incisive, somewhat reflecting the darker undercurrents of the times, even touching upon current affairs and politics.

== inside outside ==
A project on behalf of the Zionskirche (Church of Zion), Berlin.

For that purpose the artist has created a graphic portrait of the Zionskirchplatz (Square of the Church of Zion). The result of that endeavour was issued in the form of a portfolio in October 2016.

== The Kersbach roundabout ==
Placing first at a European contest with 101 participants, in 2020 the artist brought his concept into reality at the Kersbach intersection. He based his idea on an excursion into the Frankonian Switzerland by the romantic poet Ludwig Tieck and his friend Heinrich Wackenroder during Pentecost in 1793. There and then the ideal type of a romantic landscape revealed itself to Tieck. In his project Winter is quoting an excerpt from Tieck's travel diary: “All of nature is to man, if he is poetically inclined, just a mirror in which he only rediscovers himself.” The seemingly floating metal ring containing the words circles the inside of the roundabout and rises in a spiral shape. Material: Coated aluminum, goldleaf, length of metal ring: 49.20 m, height: 1.07 m. According to a ranking published by the German automobile club ADAC, the Kersbach roundabout is one of the 11 most extraordinary of the world.

== time fountain ==
granite, stainless steel, water/ Forchheim, Germany 2002

Inside the forecourt of Forchheim's train station you will find the “time fountain”, designed by Harald Winter. In a sense, the artist has created an “architectural clock” fueled by the element of water, which, as it progresses, provides the waiting traveler with an opportunity to ponder the concept of time, as well as check the time of day. The physical structure itself features a slightly curved semicircle of twelve square granite columns, the height of each increasing with the passing hours of the day. The water flowing out of each of the hour stones represents the time that has already elapsed. By adding a jet of water every five minutes a more exact reading of this clock is made possible. After a cycle of twelve jet fountains has been completed, water will start flowing out of the next column thus marking the passing of yet another hour. On behalf of the Folk Society of Forchheim, the fountain was officially donated to the town of Forchheim by Dr. Dieter George in March 2003.

== Memorial to Wilhelm Kleemann ==
In 2013 the artist was commissioned to design a memorial to the Jewish banker Dr. Wilhelm Kleeman, who was born in Forchheim in 1869. Kleemann lived in Berlin until 1933, where one of the offices he held was as the chairman of the Jewish community there. In 1940 he emigrated to New York. Winter has created an interactive memorial that can be walked on in Kleemann's native town, by setting a 5.5 meter long band of granite with inlaid letters of stainless steel into the pavement of Wilhelm-Kleemann Weg. In addition, a QR code engraved into a stele provides access to a website dedicated to Kleemann's life:

== Performance ==
- "Katharina läuft durchs Haus", Pfalzmuseum 2005, Forchheim
- "Satzbaulust", Pfalzmuseum 2006, Forchheim
- "MaxMoritzProjekt", Pfalzmuseum, 2008, Forchheim
- "money", Red Gate Gallery, 2009, London

== Selection of personal shows (P) and group exhibitions (G) ==
- Wien, derKUNSTRAUM, 2022,
- Berlin, Zion's church, 2016 (P)
- Erlangen, Friedrich-Alexander University 2012 (P)
- Geneva, United Nations 2010 (P)
- New York, LAE Gallery 2009 (G)
- London, Red Gate Gallery 2009 (P)
- Castellabate, Castello 2007 (P)
- Forchheim, Pfalzmuseum 2005 (P)
- Portici, CRIAI 2002 (P)
- Naples, Goethe Institute, 2001 (P)
- Berlin, Kunstquartier, 1991 (G)
- Graz, Haus der Architektur 1986 (G)
- Munich, Haus der Kunst, 1982/1983 (G)
