= Leo I of Cava =

Italian abbot and saint (died 1079)

Saint Leo I of Cava
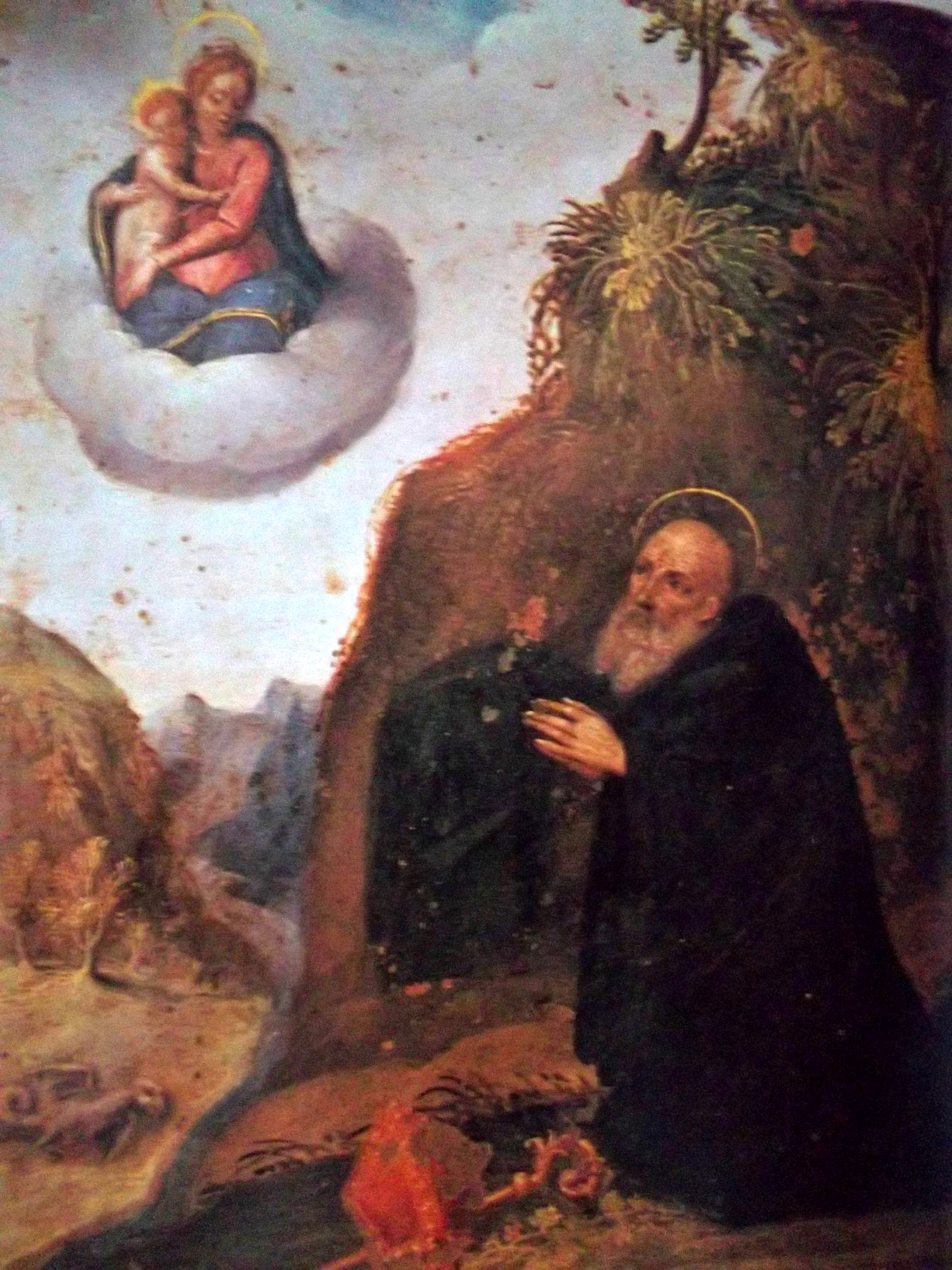
- The Virgin appears to Saint Leo from Lucca

Abbot
- Born: Unknown; Lucca, Italy
- Died: 1079; Cava de' Tirreni, Italy
- Venerated in: Roman Catholic Church
- Canonized: Cultus confirmed in 1893 by Pope Leo XIII
- Feast: 12 July

Leo I of Cava (Italian: San Leone I Abate; died 1079) was an Italian abbot and the second abbot of the Abbey of La Trinità della Cava in Cava de' Tirreni. He is venerated as a saint in the Roman Catholic Church.

== Life ==
Little is known about the early life of Leo I. He was born in Lucca and later became a monk at the Abbey of La Trinità della Cava. He succeeded Alferius as abbot and led the monastery during the 11th century.

During his abbacy, the monastery expanded its religious and social influence in the region. He is traditionally associated with strengthening the Benedictine rule and the spiritual life of the community.

== Veneration ==
The first four abbots of Cava were officially recognised as saints on 21 December 1893 by Pope Leo XIII.

These abbots include:

- Alferius
- Leo I (1050–1079)
- Peter of Pappacarbone (1079–1122)
- Constabilis (1122–1124)

== See also ==
- Cava de' Tirreni
- La Trinità della Cava

== Bibliography ==
- Hugone abbate Venusino, Vitae quatuor priorum abbatum cavensium Alferii, Leonis, Petri et Costabilis, in Rerum Italicarum Scriptores, Bologna, 1941
- Simeone Leone, Dalla fondazione del cenobio al secolo XVI, in La badia di Cava, Cava de’ Tirreni, 1985
- Massimo Buchicchio, Cronotassi degli Abati della Santissima Trinità de La Cava, Cava de' Tirreni, 2010
- Joseph Ratzinger, Santi. Gli autentici apologeti della Chiesa, Lindau Edizioni, Torino, 2007 ISBN 978-88-7180-706-5
