= Castellabate =

Town and comune in Campania, Italy

- Comune
- Comune di Castellabate
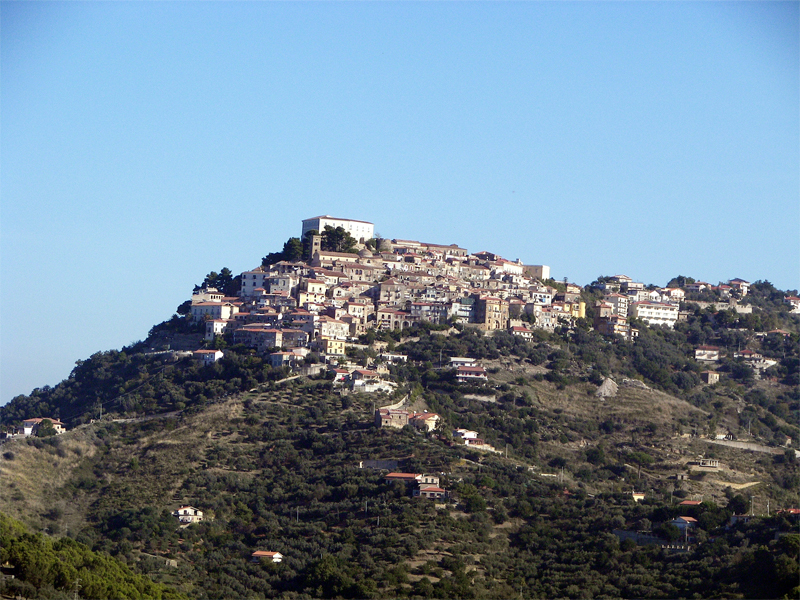
- View of Castellabate.

- Coat of arms

- Location of Castellabate in Italy Castellabate (Campania)
- Coordinates: 40°16′44″N 14°57′10″E
- Country: Italy
- Region: Campania
- Province: Salerno (SA)
- Frazioni: Alano, Licosa, Ogliastro Marina, Santa Maria, San Marco

Government
  - Mayor: Costabile Spinelli

Area
  - Total: 36 km^{2} (14 sq mi)
- Elevation: 289 m (948 ft)

Population (30 June 2017)
  - Total: 9,181
  - Density: 260/km^{2} (660/sq mi)
- Demonym: Castellani or Castellabatesi
- Time zone: UTC+1 (CET)
  - Summer (DST): UTC+2 (CEST)
- Postal code: 84048
- Dialing code: 0974
- ISTAT code: 065031
- Patron saint: St. Costabile
- Saint day: 17 February
- Website: Official website

Castellabate (Cilentan: Castiellabbate) is a town and comune in the province of Salerno in the Campania region of south-western Italy. It is one of I Borghi più belli d'Italia ("The most beautiful villages of Italy").

== History ==
The area has been inhabited since Upper Palaeolithic times. In early medieval times, the current frazione of Licosa was a base of the Saracens, who were defeated here in 846 by a coalition of the Duchy of Naples, Amalfi, Sorrento and Gaeta.

The history of the current Castellabate is tied to Saint Costabile Gentilcore (St. Constabilis), fourth abbot of La Trinità della Cava. In 1123, the same year in which he was elevated to the position of abbot, he started construction on the Angel's Castle (10 October 1123), which afterwards became entitled to him. His title gave the village its present name: Castrum Abbatis, Latin for "the castle of the abbot". His abbacy lasted until 17 February 1124. His successor, Simeon, completed its construction and helped the inhabitants.

Later, Castellabate fell under the control of the barony of the Cilento. It then passed, in turn, to Caracciolo, Loffredo, Filomarino, Acquaviva, and finally the Granito family (who carried the title of marquis and later became princes by marriage) in 1745. Castellabate remained in the family of the Prince of Belmonte until the end of the feudal era.

Numerous medieval structures remain in use today with the most significant being the Castello Dell 'Abate, Basilica Pontificia Santa Maria de Gulia, and the Piazza 10 Ottobre 1123 (Malzone). The original four defensive walls of Castello dell 'Abate, a courtyard and arches remain today. The castle serves as a site for cultural events although the interior has been remodeled and hosts an art museum. The museum contains valuable archeological discoveries such as ancient amphoras and features the work of local artists. The underground, featuring original stairs and passageways as well as arrow slips and gun loops has been stabilized and also is available to tour. Legend has it that the underground passageways connected to the villages below were used as routes of escape from marauding pirates.

The Basilica Pontificia Santa Maria de Gulia, built in the 12th century was commissioned by the successor of Costabile Gentilcore. Expansions and renovations of the Basilica have occurred over the years and today it features three naves, transept and apse, a domed roof, an annexed bell tower with functional carillon, and several mosaics and paintings, including one of the Archangel Michael.

The Piazza 10 Ottobre 1123 built the year work began on the Castell dell’Abate is located in the center of the village featuring cafes, shops, and a tourist agency. Several notable palaces remain today including the Palazzo Matarazzo (currently serving as a tourist hotel). The nobleman, Francesco Matarazzo (1854–1937) born in Castellabate is credited with creating a rich economic empire and stimulating emigration to Brazil; the family continues to support the local area (D’Auria). A recent example is the gift of the Villa Matarazzo which has been renovated and now serves as a community setting for civic events and houses a cinema; the surrounding grounds feature a nature park and playground for children.

== Geography ==
Castellabate borders with the municipalities of Agropoli, Laureana Cilento, Montecorice and Perdifumo. It counts the hamlets (frazioni) of Alano, Licosa, Ogliastro Marina, Santa Maria (the municipal seat) and San Marco; and the localities of Lago and Tresino.

Castellabate is 280 meters above sea level and lies in the middle of the Cilento National Park. It is situated on the gulf of Policastro, the island of Capri can be seen from the shoreline.

Castellabate is part of the Cilento National Park and the Vallo di Diano (Pellecchia) distinguished by forests, natural caves, inaccessible peaks, and miles of walking paths in a setting full of a variety of flora and fauna.

== Transport ==
The nearest railway station is found at Agropoli. Served by numerous trains, which include Eurostar Italia, it is found on the route of Naples-Reggio Calabria. In terms of roads, it is served by the A3 Highway, which connects the town with the coast of Cilento.

Access by sea is found at the port of San Marco di Castellabate.

== Cuisine ==
Castellabate's cuisine is based on local products: wine, olive oil, cheese (such as mozzarella), garbanzo beans, salami, and confections made with figs.

== Media ==
Benvenuti al Sud, an Italian adaptation of the 2008 French film Bienvenue chez les Ch'tis, is set in Castellabate and partly in its hamlets Santa Maria and San Marco.

== International relations ==
Castellabate is twinned with:

- Blieskastel, Germany, since 2008

== See also ==
- Cilento
- Cilentan Coast
- Santa Maria di Castellabate
- Harald Winter
