= Alferius =

Italian abbot and saint (930–1050)

Saint Alferius
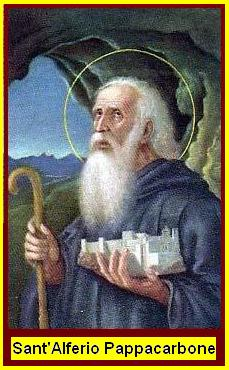
- Born: 930; Salerno
- Died: 12 April 1050 (aged 119 or 120)
- Venerated in: Roman Catholic Church
- Canonized: cultus confirmed in 1893 by Leo XIII
- Feast: April 12

Alferius (Italian: Sant'Alferio) (930–1050) was an Italian abbot and saint.

== Life ==
Alferius was born in Salerno to the noble Pappacarbona family. He spent many years in service to Guaimar. Prince of Salerno. In 1002, Alferius was named to head a delegation from his city to King Robert II of France. Taking ill during the journey, he convalesced at the monastery of S. Michele della Chiusa. While there, he met Odilo of Cluny and vowed to become a monk himself if he recovered. He spent some time at Cluny before returning to Salerno.

Around 1020, he withdrew to the foot of Monte Finestra, southwest of Cava, where he lived a life of contemplation and prayer. At the beginning of the 11th century, a nucleus of hermit monks, attracted by the famed saintliness of Alferius, joined him. In 1011, he founded the monastery of La Trinità della Cava. It followed the Benedictine rule.

== Veneration ==
The first four abbots of Cava were officially recognized as saints on December 21, 1893, by Pope Leo XIII. The first four abbots are Alferius; Leo I (1050–79); Peter of Pappacarbone (1079–1123); and Constabilis.

== See also ==
- Cava de' Tirreni, Italy (Italia)
- La Trinità della Cava

== Bibliography ==
- Joseph Ratzinger: Sainti. Gli autentici apologeti della Chiesa., Lindau Edizioni, Torino 2007. ISBN 978-88-7180-706-5
