= San Marco, Castellabate =

San Marco Sandu Marco
- Frazione
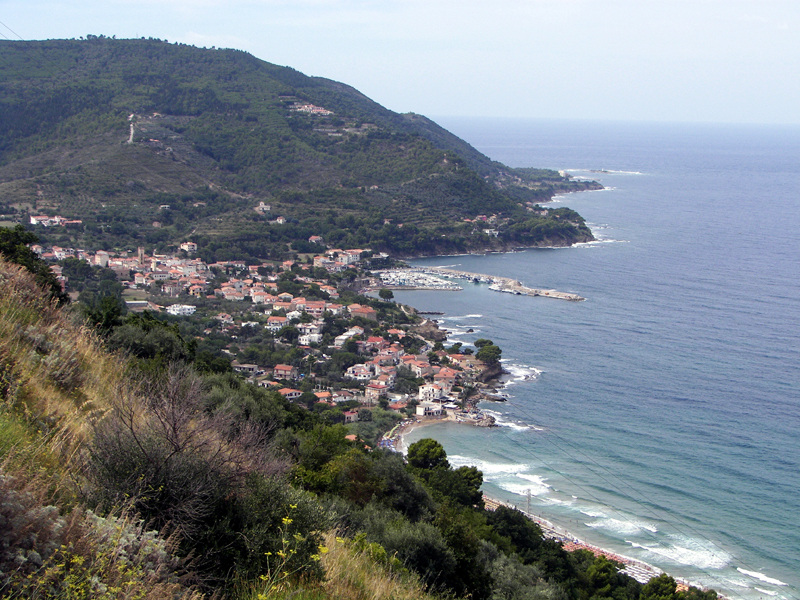

- Location of San Marco in Italy
- Coordinates: 40°16′2.78″N 14°56′20.33″E
- Country: Italy
- Region: Campania
- Province: Salerno (SA)
- Comune: Castellabate
- Elevation: 15 m (49 ft)

Population (2009)
  - Total: 1,139
- Demonym: Sammarchesi
- Time zone: UTC+1 (CET)
  - Summer (DST): UTC+2 (CEST)
- Postal code: 84071
- Dialing code: (+39) 0974
- Patron saint: St. Mark
- Saint day: 25 April

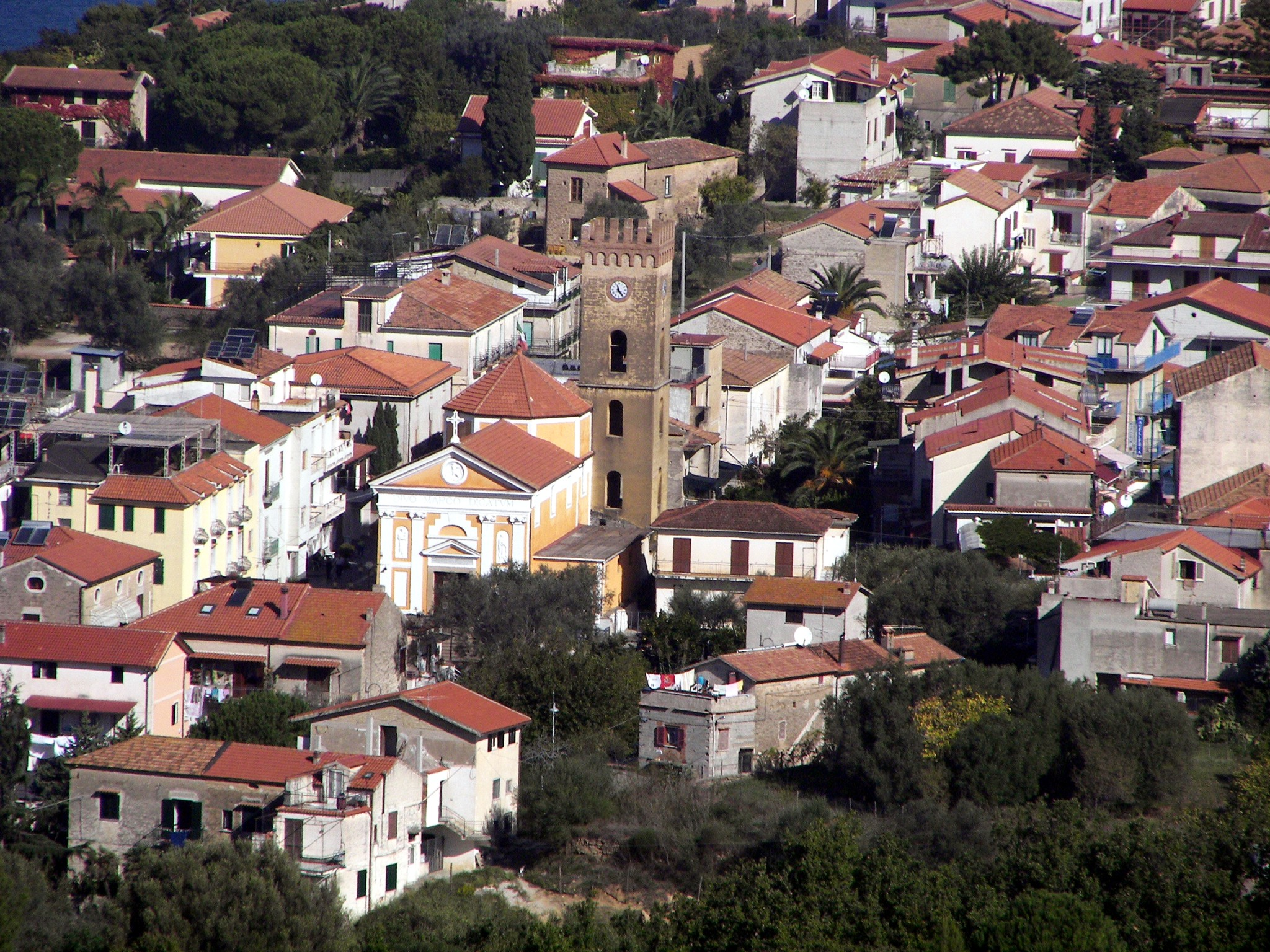
Village centre with the church of St. Mark

San Marco (Cilentan: Sandu Marco) is a southern Italian village and hamlet (frazione) of Castellabate, a municipality in the province of Salerno, Campania. As of 2009 its population was of 1,139.

== History ==
Settled since the Paleolithic, San Marco was the location of the Ancient Roman town of Erculia. The village was first mentioned in 1168, identified as the farmhouse of Sancti Marci, part of the baronage of Castello dell'Abate. The original settlement extended behind the current port, and has expanded towards the end of the 20th century to the inland, due to its touristic growth.

== Geography ==
Located in the central-northern side of Cilento, by the Tyrrhenian Sea, San Marco is extended from the national road 267, at the zone of Torretta, to the coast nearby the park of Licosa. It borders with the other frazione of Santa Maria and is 4 km far from Castellabate, 15 from Agropoli, 6 from Case del Conte, 11,5 from Agnone Cilento and 18 from Acciaroli. It counts a port that is served by hydrofoils for passenger transport.

== Media ==
Benvenuti al Sud, an Italian adaptation of the 2008 French film Bienvenue chez les Ch'tis, has been set in Castellabate and partly in Santa Maria and San Marco.

== Personalities ==
- Agostino Di Bartolomei (1955-1994), football player
- Marek Jackowski (1946-2013), polish rock musician

== Gallery ==
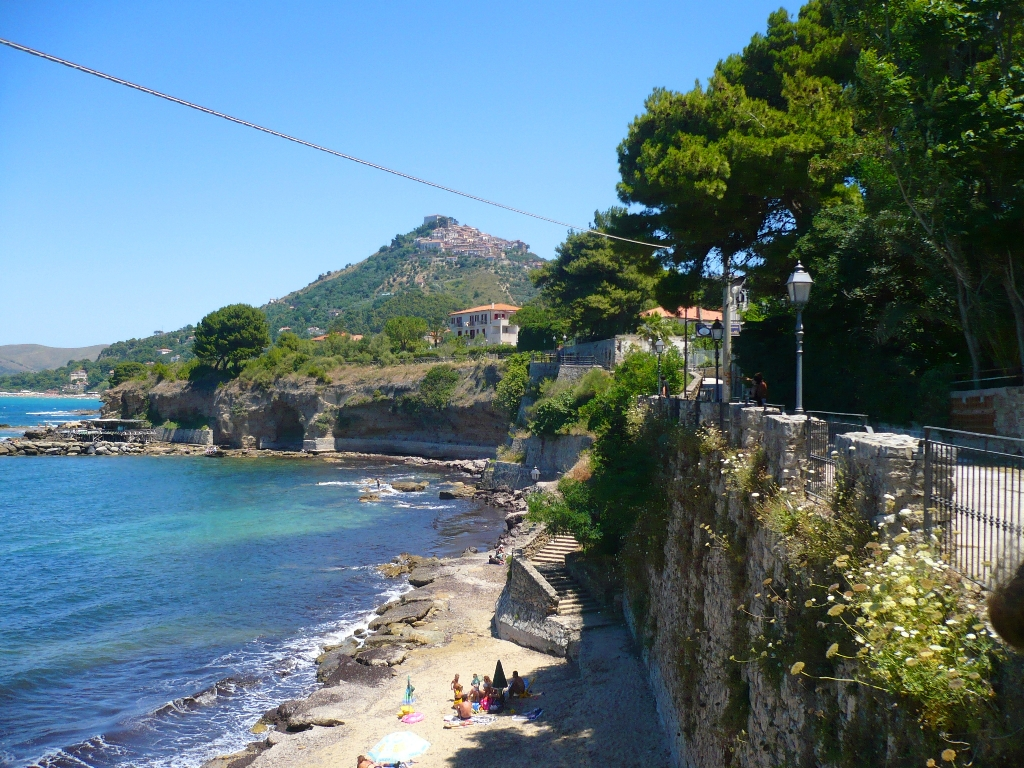
Promenade nearby an Ancient Roman necropolis

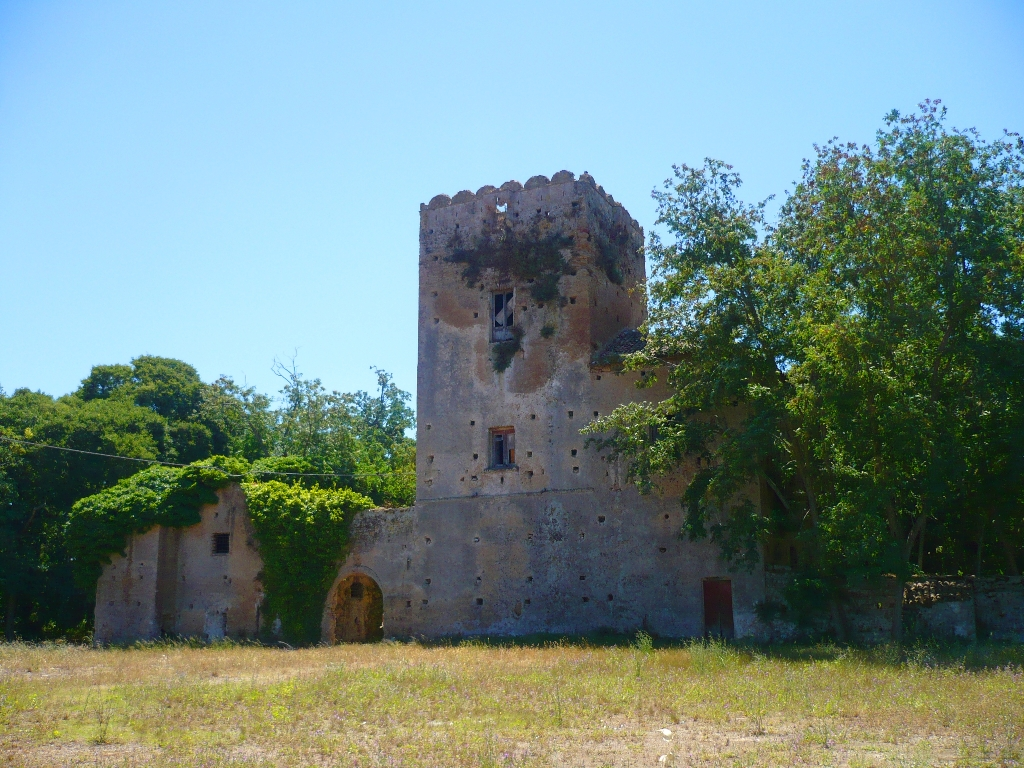
The ancient tower of Torretta

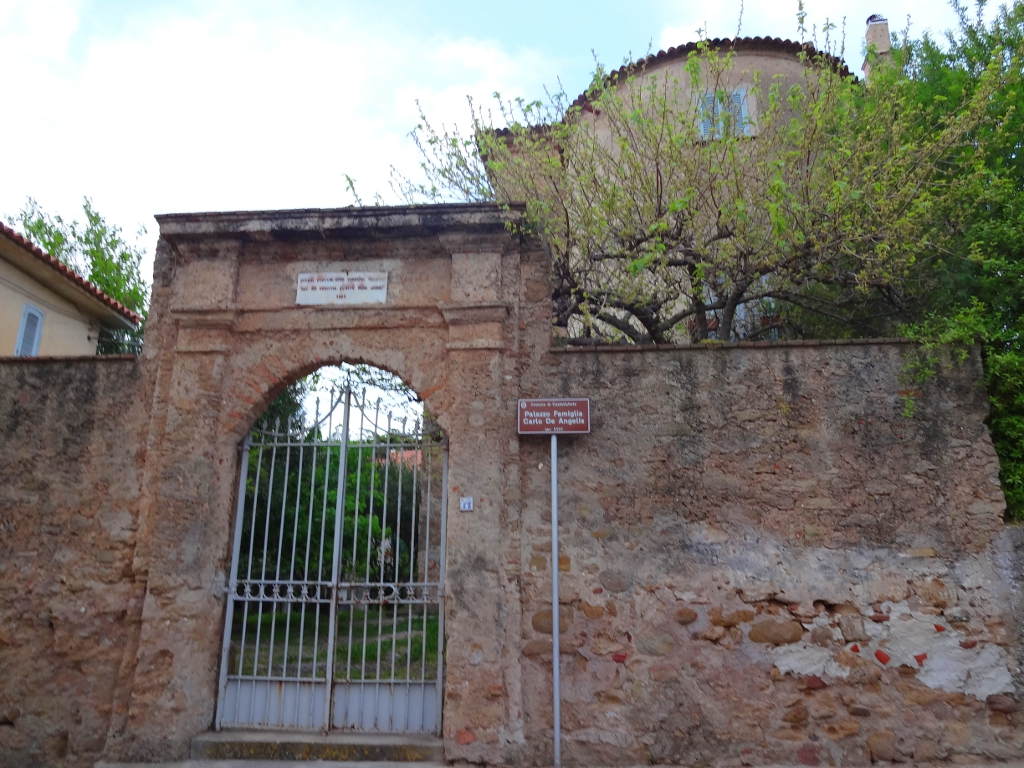
De Angelis Palace

== See also ==
- Cilentan dialect
- Cilento and Vallo di Diano National Park
