= Agnone Cilento =

- Frazione
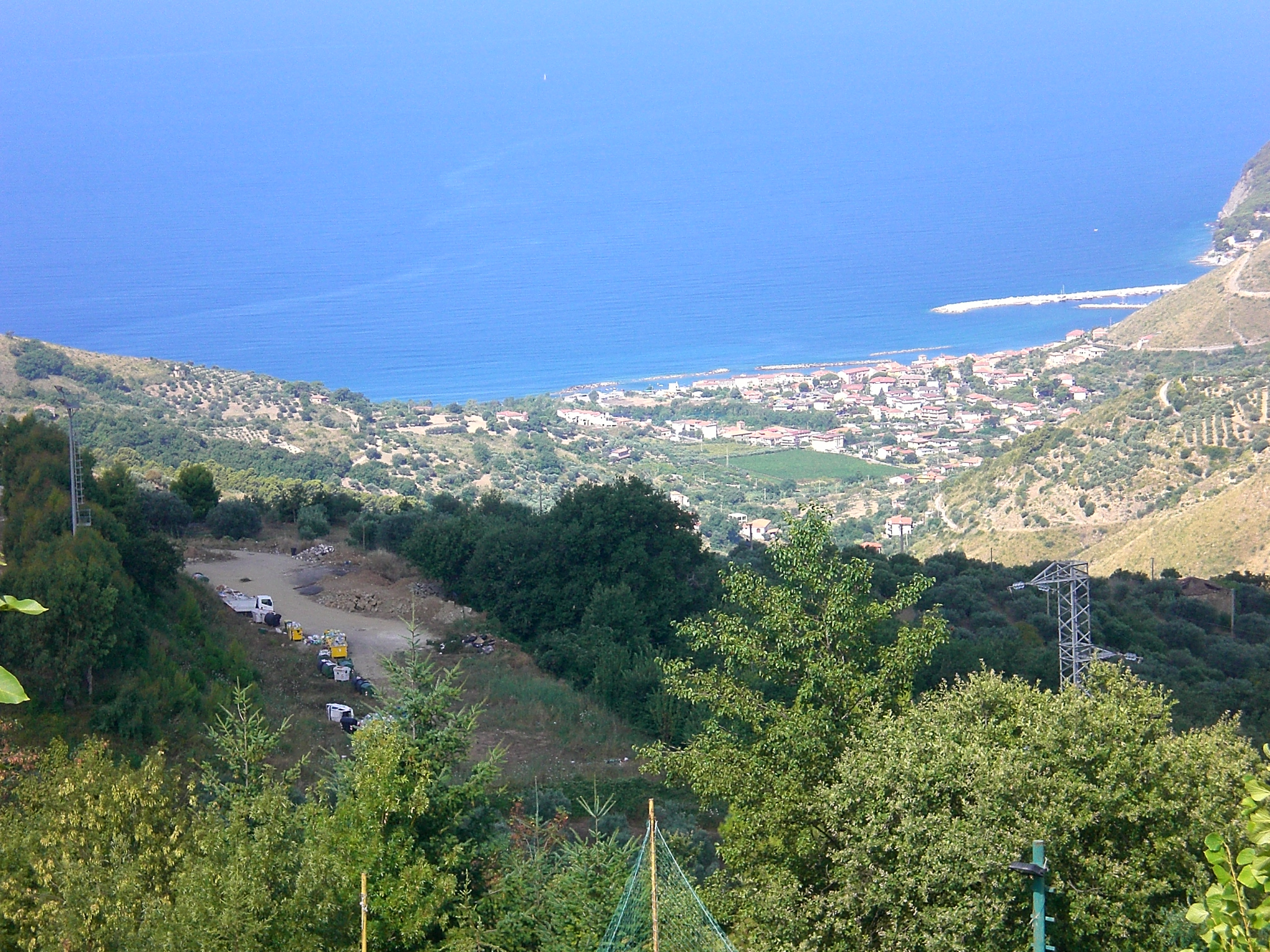

- Location of Agnone Cilento in Italy
- Coordinates: 40°13′00″N 15°00′00″E
- Country: Italy
- Region: Campania
- Province: Salerno (SA)
- Comune: Montecorice
- Elevation: 20 m (66 ft)

Population (2005)
  - Total: 810
- Demonym: Agnonesi
- Time zone: UTC+1 (CET)
  - Summer (DST): UTC+2 (CEST)
- Postal code: 84060
- Dialing code: (+39) 0974

Agnone Cilento, also shortened as Agnone, is an Italian hamlet (frazione), the greatest one in the municipality of Montecorice in the province of Salerno, Campania region.

== History ==
Agnone was first mentioned in 1187, when close to the modern village the small church of "Santa Maria de Hercula" (or S.M. ad Herchia) was built.

== Geography ==
The village is situated in the central-northern area of Cilento by its coast. It is located at 3 km from Montecorice, 6 from Acciaroli, 7 from Case del Conte, 13 from Santa Maria di Castellabate, 24 from Agropoli and 21 from the ancient Greek town of Velia.

Agnone is composed, outside from its center, by several little surrounding localities: San Nicola a Mare (the seat of the port), San Nicola dei Lembi, Rosaine, Ripe Rosse, Magazzeni, Capitello, Punta Capitello, Guarino and Parco Marghetto.

== Tourism ==
The village, part of Cilento and Vallo di Diano National Park, is strongly receptive for tourism, especially on summer, due to its links to Agropoli, Salerno and Naples (by buses and hydrofoils) and to the quality of its water; which suddenly give it the Blue Flag beach.

== See also ==
- Cilento
- Cilento and Vallo di Diano National Park
