= Constabilis =

Italian abbot and saint (c. 1070 – 1124)

Saint Constabilis
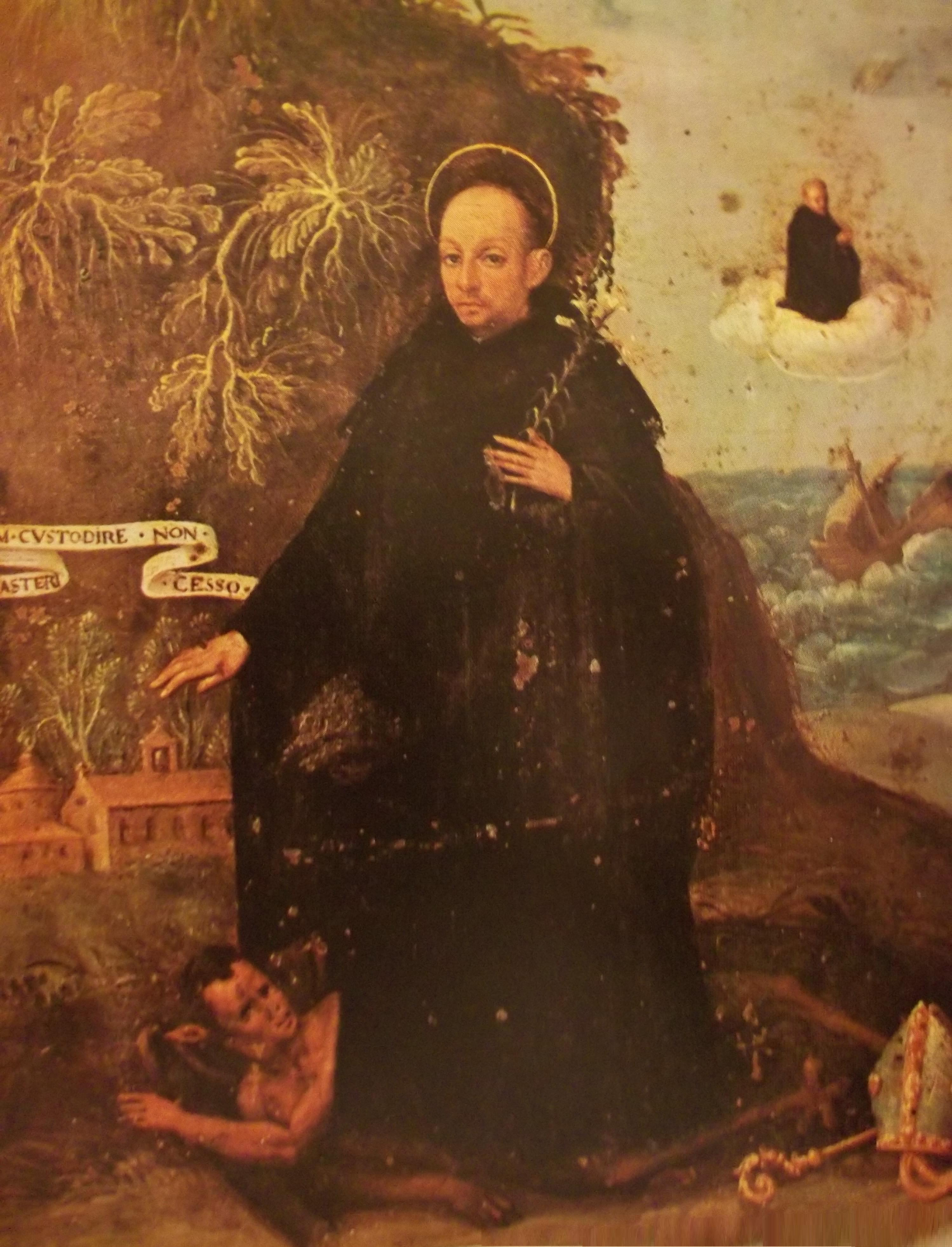
- San Costabile and the miracle of the ship saved from the wreck of the monastery
- Born: c. 1070; Tresino
- Died: February 17, 1124 (aged 53 or 54); Cava de' Tirreni
- Venerated in: Roman Catholic Church
- Canonized: cultus confirmed in 1893 by Leo XIII
- Feast: February 17
- Patronage: Castellabate; sailors

Constabilis (Italian: San Constabile, San Costabile) (c. 1070 – 1124) was an Italian abbot and saint. He was abbot of La Trinità della Cava, located at Cava de' Tirreni, from 1122 to 1124.

== Biography ==
He was born around 1070 at Tresino, in Lucania (currently part of the comune of Castellabate), to the noble Gentilcore family. At the age of seven, he was entrusted to the care of abbot of Cava, Leo I. Constabilis then became a monk at the abbey. He followed the Benedictine Rule zealously and was entrusted by the abbot to manage important negotiations and transactions on behalf of the abbey. On January 10, 1118, he was promoted by abbot Peter of Pappacarbone to the position of coadjutor. He subsequently succeeded Peter as abbot after the latter's death on March 4, 1122.

Constabilis is venerated as the patron saint of Castellabate, for the reason that he founded the town. He started construction on the Angel's Castle on 10 October 1123, which afterwards became entitled to him. His title gave the village its present name: Castrum Abbatis, the "castle of the abbot."

He steered the monastery in an unassuming manner and cared for the general and individual needs of the monks. He died at the age of fifty-three and was buried in the church overhanging the grotto of Arsicia that had been used by the founder of the abbey, Alferius.

Constabilis died on 17 February 1124. He was succeeded by Simeon.

== Veneration ==
After his death, he is said to have appeared to his successors and was venerated as a protector of the ships belonging to this abbey.

The first four abbots of Cava were recognized as saints on December 21, 1893 by Pope Leo XIII. Veneration for Constabilis had already existed; however, this had now been officially approved.
