= Latinity =

Proficiency in Latin, or relating to Latins or Romans

Latinity (Latinitas) is proficiency in Latin. The term may also be used to refer to the use of Latinisms or the imitation of Latin style.
