= Montecorice =

- Comune
- Comune di Montecorice
- Coat of arms

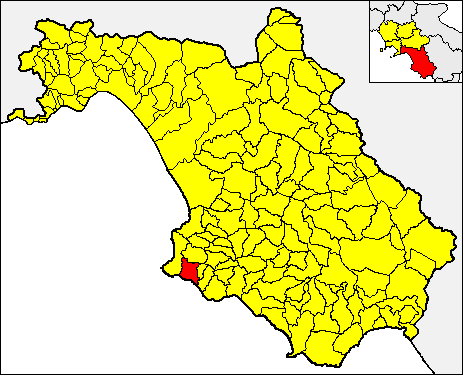
- Montecorice within the Province of Salerno

- Location within Italy Location within Campania
- Coordinates: 40°14′3″N 14°59′2″E
- Country: Italy
- Region: Campania
- Province: Salerno (SA)
- Frazioni: Agnone Cilento, Case del Conte, Cosentini, Fornelli, Giungatelle, Ortodonico, Zoppi

Government
  - Mayor: Pierpaolo Piccirilli (since 2012)

Area
  - Total: 22.13 km^{2} (8.54 sq mi)
- Elevation: 90 m (300 ft)

Population (31 December 2011)
  - Total: 2,545
  - Density: 115.0/km^{2} (297.9/sq mi)
- Demonym: Montecoricesi
- Time zone: UTC+1 (CET)
  - Summer (DST): UTC+2 (CEST)
- Postal code: 84060
- Dialing code: 0974
- Website: Official website

Montecorice is a town and comune in the province of Salerno in the Campania region of south-western Italy.

== History ==
Montecorice likely originated as a small village around the monastery of Sant'Arcangelo, which existed as early as the 10th century.

== Geography ==
The municipality is situated in the middle of Cilento region, bordering with the municipalities of Castellabate, Perdifumo, San Mauro Cilento and Serramezzana. The village is situated in a hilly area only 3 km from the coast.

It counts 7 hamlets (frazioni): Agnone Cilento, Case del Conte, Cosentini, Fornelli, Giungatelle, Ortodonico and Zoppi.

== Economy ==
The economy is mostly based on agriculture (olives, figs, wine grape, fruit), animal husbandry and fishing. Summer tourism is developed in Agnone and its neighborhood.

== See also ==
- Cilentan Coast
- Cilentan dialect
- Cilento and Vallo di Diano National Park
