= La Trinità della Cava =

Benedictine abbey in Italy

Territorial Abbey of La Trinità della Cava Abbatia Territorialis Sanctissimae Trinitatis Cavensis

Catholic
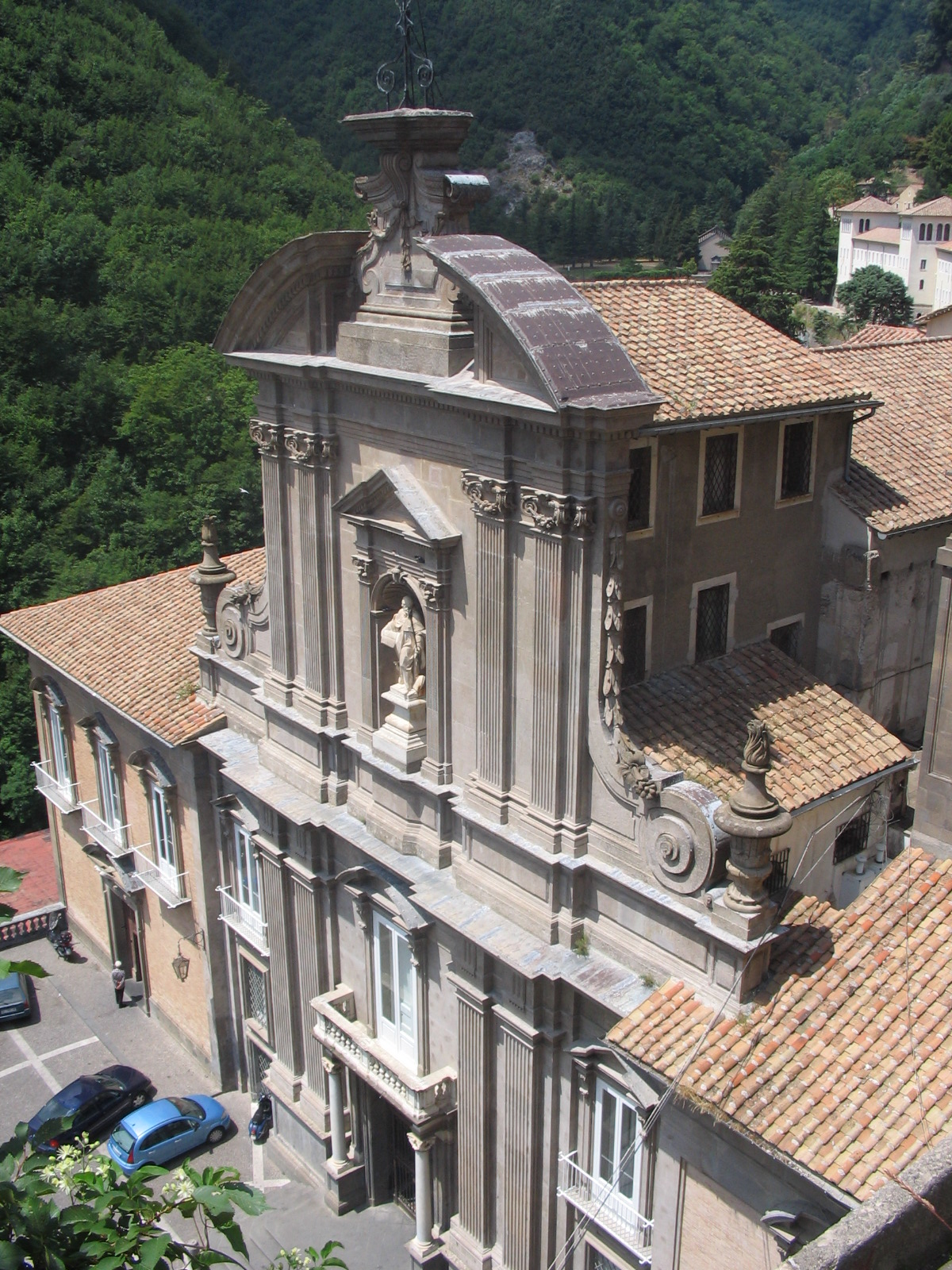
- Cathedral of the Holy Trinity

Location
- Country: Italy
- Ecclesiastical province: Salerno-Campagna-Acerno
- Coordinates: 40°40′55″N 14°41′28″E

Statistics
- Area: 10 km^{2} (3.9 sq mi)
- Population: Total; Catholics: (as of 2023); 36; 36 (100%)
- Parishes: 2
- Members: 1

Information
- Denomination: Catholic Church
- Rite: Roman Rite
- Established: 1025
- Cathedral: Cattedrale di SS. Trinità
- Secular priests: 4

Current leadership
- Pope: Leo XIV
- Abbot: Michele Petruzzelli, O.S.B.
- Bishops emeritus: Leone Morinelli; Giordano Rota

The Territorial abbey of La Trinità della Cava (Latin: Abbatia Territorialis Sanctissimae Trinitatis Cavensis), commonly known as Badia di Cava, is a Benedictine territorial abbey located near Cava de' Tirreni, in the province of Salerno, southern Italy. It stands in a gorge of the Finestre Hills, some 14km or 8.5mi north-west of Salerno.

== History ==
Tradition states that the monastic tradition began in 1011, with the arrival of three hermits one of whom was Alferius of Pappacarbone, a noble of Salerno who became a Cluniac monk and had lived as a hermit in the vicinity since 1011. Another story has it that the princes of Salerno founded the monastery in 1025. The foundation privilege of March 1025 survives in the monastery library.

The Lombard Guiamarus III and his son granted to Abbot Alferius feudal possession of a defined territory, with all the persons, free or slave, in it at present or in the future, exempt from royal taxes and impositions. In 1058, Prince Gisulf II of Salerno extended those privileges to Castrum Sancti Adjutoris, Albola, Cetara, and Fonti.

The Normans, too, were generous supporters of the monastery of La Trinità della Cava. In July 1079, Robert Guiscard (1057–1085) gave Abbot Pietro the church of S. Matteo di Roccapiemonte. In August 1080, Robert confirmed all the feudal territories, rights and privileges which his Lombard predecessors had granted to the abbots and monastery of Trinità della Cava. In May 1081, Robert Guiscard's nephew, Richard son of Drogo (1046–1051), donated to La Trinità della Cava the monasteries of S. Angelo, S. Caterina, and S. Vito, as well as the vassalages of Mutula and Massafra. In May 1086, Duke Roger Borsa (1085–1111) gave it the port of Vietri sul mare, just west of Salerno.

King William I (1154–1166) issued a charter in Apri 1154, in which he confirmed all the grants made by his predecessors, and added nearly complete judicial powers, except in criminal cases, including the right to name judges and public notaries.

=== Popes ===
In the bull "Cum universis" of 21 September 1089, Pope Urban II (1088–1099) stated that the abbot was to be freely elected, and that his consecration was the prerogative of the Roman pontiff, while the granting of episcopal powers belonged to the archbishop of Salerno. The privileges were confirmed by Pope Paschal II (1099–1118) in the bull "Cum universis sanctae" of 30 August 1100; and by Pope Calixtus II and Innocent II.

On 5 September 1092, Pope Urban II consecrated the church of the monastery of Cava. The bull "In Universis," of 14 September 1092, in which Pope Urban narrates the consecration and his gifts of privileges, is a forgery. In 1092, however, he did grant indulgences which were applicable annually on Holy Thursday and Good Friday; these were confirmed by Pope Clement XIII in August 1761, and extended them until the third day after Easter.

Pope Urban II endowed this monastery with many privileges, making it immediately subject to the Holy See, with jurisdiction over the surrounding territory.

On 6 August 1098, Pope Urban II took note of complaints of Archbishop Alfano of Salerno that the abbot of Cava had taken possession of the church of SS Trinità and other churches, and admitted that he had been unaware of privileges already granted to the diocese of Salerno with respect to those churches. He declared his own grants erroneous (subreptitious) and cancelled them. In May 1099, having seen the actual privileges, Urban revoked the liberty of the parish of Cava.

Pope Alexander III granted the abbots of Cava the privilege of wearing episcopal insignia on major holidays, at papal councils, and at the funerals of ecclesiastics and nobles.

The first four abbots were canonized as saints on December 21, 1893, by Pope Leo XIII.

=== Diocese of Cava ===
In 1394, Pope Boniface IX elevated the monastery of Cava to the status of a diocese, with the bishops also being the abbots.

Cardinal Oliviero Carafa, the last of the Abbots Commendatory, agreed to relinquish the abbey to Pope Alexander VI, on the condition that the bishopric of Cava be abolished on his death. Pope Alexander agreed, in the bull "Regimini universalis" of 10 April 1497.

In the struggles of Louis XII of France and Ferdinand of Aragon for possession of the kingdom of Naples, the immunities of the monastery of Cava and its properties was regularly ignored. For a time Cava was acknowledged to belong to King Louis. In 1507, the monks and their abbot, Dom Chrysostomus de Alexandro, were forcibly ejected from the abbey, which brought excommunication from Pope Julius II against the perpetrators, allegedly led by Ferdinand Castriot. When they recovered their property, the monks came under the protection of Queen Joanna of Naples, from 1507 until her death on 28 August 1518.

In 1513, Pope Leo X separated the two offices, detaching the city of Cava from the abbot's jurisdiction. About the same time the Cluniacs were replaced by Cassinese monks.

Damaging earthquakes struck the area of Cava on 8 September 1694 and in August 1714 (centered on Salerno). Another earthquake, on 29 January 1733, did considerable damage to the cathedral.

In the same year, 1733, Abbot Filippo de Pace, was compelled to defend his domain against the attempted encroachment of the papal nuncio at the royal court in Naples. He appealed his case to Rome, where his immunities were vindicated.

In 1796, two natural disasters struck the monastery. On 31 October, a landslide swept down and destroyed part of the old dormitory, and on Christmas Eve a landslide of earth and trees destroyed the choir of the church, while a few hours later another slide destroyed the abbey library.

The church and the greater part of the buildings were entirely modernized in 1796. The old Gothic cloisters are preserved. The church contains a fine organ and several ancient sarcophagi. The church of the monastery has the tombs of Queen Sibylla of Burgundy (died 1150), second consort of King Roger II of Sicily, and a number of notable ecclesiastics.

=== French occupation ===
The monastery was closed by Joseph Bonaparte, King of Naples (1806–1808), by a decree of 13 February 1807, The library and archives were confiscated and became state cultural property. The former abbey was designated an "Establishment", and the former abbot, Dom Carolo Mazzacane, was appointed Director of the Establishment; twenty-five former monks were appointed guardians of the Establishment. The many properties of the former abbey were confiscated and either repurposed or sold off, while the members of the Establishment were provided with an annual salary of 4,000 ducats as state officials. They were forbidden to wear clerical garb.but the community remained relatively unscathed, thanks to Abbot Carlo Mazzacane, and was restored after Napoleon's fall. The abbey still provides the surrounding parishes with clergy.

=== Modern reeorganization ===
Following the Second Vatican Council, (1962–1965) and in accordance with the norms laid out in the council's decree, Christus Dominus chapter 40, Pope Paul VI ordered a reorganization of the ecclesiastical provinces in southern Italy.

On 8 September 1976, the Congregation of Bishops, after extensive consultation, transferred territory from the Diocese of Acerenza, the Diocese of Rapolla, and from the Territorial Abbacy of Santissima Trinità di Cava de’ Tirreni, to the archdiocese of Potenza.

On 30 April 1979, specifically citing the Council decree Christus Dominus, Pope Paul VI removed the diocese of Cava from direct subjection to the Papacy, and assigned it as suffragan to the metropolinate of Amalfi. A few months later, on 15 October 1979, in the decree "Quo Aptius", the Sacred Congregation of Bishops redrew the boundaries of the Territorial Prelature. It lost fifteen parishes to the diocese of Vallo di Lucania; three to the diocese of Diano-Teggiano; and three to the diocese of Nocera de' Pagani. At the same time, the Territorial Abbey gained three parishes from the Diocese of Cava.

The Territorial Abbey lost additional territory in 2012. In the decree "Sanctissimae Trinitatis Cavensis", the Congregation of Bishops redefined the boundaries of the abbey, confining the territory to the Cathedral and Monastery of Sanctissima Trinitas in the town called "Frazione di Corpo di Cava." The persons belonging to that territory consisted only of the members of the monastic house, the monks, novices and postulants. In addition, three parishes of the Territorial Abbey were transferred to the Archdiocese of Amalfi-Cava. Diocesan clergy of the Territorial Abbey were likewise transferred to the archdiocese.

== Library ==
The monastery contains the Biblioteca statale del Monumento Nazionale Badia di Cava with its rich archives of public and private documents, which date back to the 8th century, e.g., the Codex Legum Longobardorum of 1004 (the oldest digest of Lombard law), and the La Cava Bible and fine incunabula. The monastery later became the seat of a national educational establishment, under the care of the Benedictines.

== Abbots ==
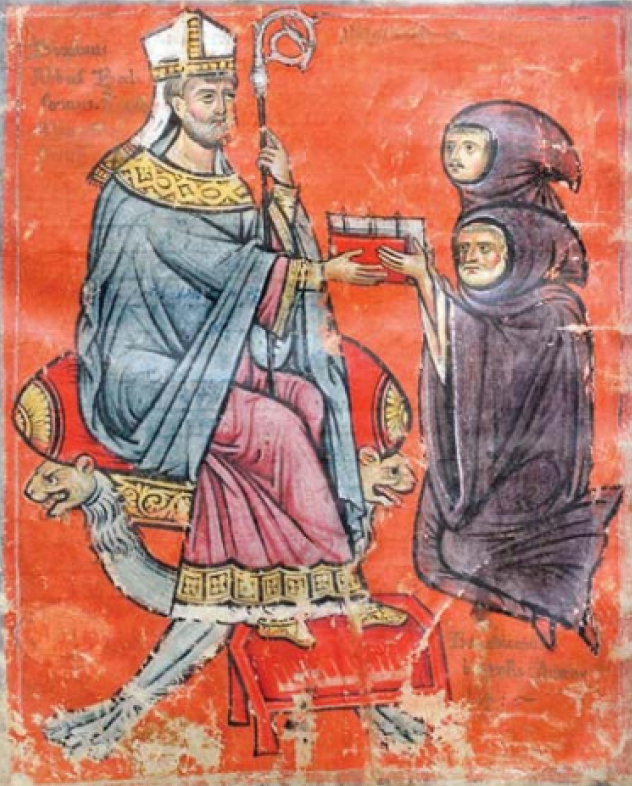
Contemporary miniature from an illuminated manuscript showing the monk–theologian Benedict of Bari giving a copy of his treatise to Abbot Balsamo.

- Saint Alferius of Pappacarbona (1011–1050)
- Saint Leo I of Cava (1050–1079)
- Saint Pietro of Pappacarbone (1079–1122)
- Saint Constabilis (1122–1124)
- Simeon (1124–1140)
- Falcone (1140–1146)
- Marino (1146–1170)
- Benincasa (1171–1194)
- Ruggiero (1194)
- Pietro II (1195–1208)
- Balsamo (1208–1232)
- Leonard (1232–1255)
- Leo II (1266–1295)
- Philip de Haya (1316–1331)
- Richardus (Guttardus) (1332–1341)
- Maynerio (1341–1366)
- Golferius (1366–1374)
- Antonio (1374–1383)
- Ligorius de Maiorinis (1383–1394)

=== Abbots of La Trinità and Bishops of Cava ===
- Francesco de Aiello (1394–1407)
- Francesco Mormile (1407–1419)
- Sagax de' Conti (1419–1426)
- Cardinal Angelotto Fusco (1426–1444)
- Ludovico Scarampi Mezzarota Trevisano (1444–1465)
- Giovanni d'Aragona (1456–1485)
- Cardinal Oliviero Carafa (1485–1497)

=== Abbots ===
==== To 1600 ====
- Arsenio (1497–1498)
- Paul of Milan (1498–1499)
- Justin de Taderico-Harbes (1499–1501)
- Vincenzo de Riso (1501–1503)
- Justin de Taderico-Harbes (1503–1504)
- Michael of Tarsia (1504–1506)
- Benedetto of Vicenza (1506–1507)
- Paul of Milan (1507–1511)
- Crisostomo d'Alessandro (1512–1517)
- Philip de Haya (1517–1528)
- Gerolamo Guevara (1528–1549)
- Pellegrino Dell'Erre (1549–1550)
- Gerolamo de Guevara (1550–1552)
- Angelo de Faggio (1552–1555)
- Bernardo d' Adamo (1555-1560)
- Bernardo de Jadra (1560–1563)
- Bernardo d' Adamo (1563–1565)
- Adriano (1565–1567)
- Diodato (1567–1568)
- Desiderio (Didier) de Hippolytis (1568–1570)
- Bernardo d' Adamo (1570–1571)
- Gerolamo Caracciolo (1571–1572)
- Bernardo Ferraiolo (1572–1573)
- Filippo Scannasorice (1573–1574)
- Desiderio (Didier) de Hippolytis (1574–1575)
- Angelo de Faggio (1575)
- Desiderio (Didier) de Hippolytis (1575–1577)
- Eleuterio (1577–1578)
- Pietro-Paolo Canosi (1578)
- Nicolò Raccagnasco (1578–1582)
- Filippo Scannasorce (1582–1586)
- Michele Abriani (1586)
- Tiburzio (1586–1588)
- Vittorino Manso (1588–1592)
- Teofilo (1592)
- Vittorino Manso (1592–1593)
- Ambrogio Rastellini (1593–1597)
- Zacharia Eusebio (1597–1599)
- Hilarion (1599–1600)

==== From 1600 to 1700 ====
- Gregorio Casamatta (1600–1602)
- Alfonso Villagaut (1602–1603)
- Ignacio de Turturitio (1603)
- Alessandro de Pochipannis (1603–1606)
- Bernard Serafini (1606)
- Lorenzo Pacifico (1606–1611)
- Alessandro Ridolfi (1611–1613)
- Augustin Venerio (1613–1630)
- Giulio Vecchioni (1630–1633)
- Zacharia Cioccarelli (1633-1634)
- Sylvestro Civitello (1634–1636)
- Severin Fusco (1636–1640)
- Gregorio Lottieri (1640–1642)
- Vittorino Schirilli (1642–1646)
- Alessandro Cardito (1647–1648)
- Giuseppe Lomellino (1648–1651)
- Vittorino Schirilli (1651–1652)
- Ignacio Bartilotto (1652–1655)
- Flaminio Altomari (1655–1661)
- Severino Boccia (1671–1677)
- Agostino De Amicis (1677–1683)
- Dominico della Quadra ((1683–1694)
- Jovita Messina (1684–1690)
- Bernardo Pasca (1690–1696)
- Luigi de Bonis (1696–1698)
- Pietro Campanile (1698–1699)
- Archangelo Ragosa (1699–1705)

==== From 1700 to 1900 ====
- Giacomo Perez-Naveratta (1705–1711)
- Placido del Balzo (1711–1716)
- Giovanni-Battista Pennese (1717–1723)
- Massimo Albritio (1723–1729)
- Filippo-Maria de Pace (1729–1735)
- Placido de Puzzo (1735–1740)
- Benedetto Maria d'Ambrosio (1740–1745)
- Filippo-Maria de Pace (1745–1749)
- Bernard Odierna (1750–1756)
- Giulio Andrea De Palma (1756–1763)
- Pietro Maria Bersanti (1763–1765)
- Angelo Maria De Rossi (1765–1768)
- Isidore Del Tufo (1768–1772)
- Gaetano Dattilo (1772–1778)
- Tiberio Ortiz (1778–1781)
- Raffaele Pasca (1781–1787)
- Alfiere Mirano (1787-1793)
- Tommaso Capomazza (1793–1801)
- Carlo Mazzacane (1801–1824)
- Giulio Maria d'Amato (1824–1828)
- Luigi Bovio (1828–1829)
- Eugenio-Maria Villaraut (1829–1833))
- Giuseppe Cavaselice (1833–1840)
- Luigi Marincola (1840–1844)
- Pietro Candida (1844–1849)
- Onofrio Granata (1849–1858)
- Giulio De Ruggiero (1859–1878)
- Michele Morcaldi (1878–1894)
- Benedetto Bonazzi (1894–1902)

==== Since 1900 ====
- Silvano de Stefano (1902–1908)
- Angelo Maria Ettinger (1910–1918)
- Giuseppe Placido M. Nicolini (1919–1928)
- Ildefonso Rea (1929–1945)
- Mauro De Caro (1946–1956)
- Fausto Mezza (1956–1967)
- Michele Alfredo Marra (1969–1992)
- Benedetto Maria Salvatore Chianetta (1995–2010)
- Michele Petruzzelli (since 2013)

== See also ==
- Roman Catholic Diocese of Cava de' Tirreni
- Cava de' Tirreni, Italy (Italia)
- Alferius

== Sources ==
- Abignente, Giovanni (1886). Gli statuti inediti di Cava dei Tirreni. (in Italian and Latin). Volume 1. Roma: E. Loescher.
- Bonazzi, B. (1897). L'abate Cavense e i suoi privilegi, specialmente quello dell'amministrazione della cresima. (in Italian). Badia di Cava 1897.
- Cappelletti, Giuseppe (1870). Le chiese d'Italia dalla loro origine sino ai nostri giorni (in Italian). Vol. vigesimoprimo (21). Venezia: Antonelli. pp. 380–384.
- Guillaume, Paul (1877). Essai historique sur l'Abbaye de Cava. (in French). Cava dei Tirreni 1887.
- Hugh (of Venosa). Vitae sanctorum abbatum Cavensium: Alferii, Leonis, Petri, Constabilis. (in Latin). Cava (Benedictine abbey): in abbatiale 1912. also: ed. L. Mattei-Cerasoli, Rerum Italicarum Scriptores Vol. 6 (Bologna, 1941).
- Kehr, Paul Fridolin (1935). Italia pontificia. Vol. VIII: Regnum Normannorum — Campania. Berlin: Weidmann. (in Latin). pp. 309-330.
- Loud, G. A. (1986). "The Abbey of Cava, its Property and Benefactors in the Norman Era," in: Anglo-Norman Studies, 9: Proceedings of the Battle Conference 1986. Totowa: Woodbridge 1987. pp. 143-177.
- Martini, Martino (1908). "II diritto feudale e 1'abate di Cava nel secolo undecimo," (in Italian), in: Rivista storica Benedettina vol. 3 (Roma: Santa Maria Nuova 1908), pp. 201-232.
- Rotili, Mario (1976). La miniatura nella badia di Cava. Vol. I : Lo scrittorio i corali miniati per l'abbazia. (in Italian) Napoli: Di Mauro 1976.
- Senatore, G. (1894). II territorio giurisdizionale della badia di Cava. (in Italian). Salerno 1894.
- Ughelli, Ferdinando; Coleti, Niccolò (1717). Italia sacra, sive De episcopis Italiæ, et insularum adjacentium (in Latin). Vol. Tomus primus (editio altera ed.). apud Sebastianum Coleti. pp. 607–619.

=== External links ===
- Official website
