= Santa Maria di Castellabate =

Santa Maria di Castellabate 'A Marina
- Frazione
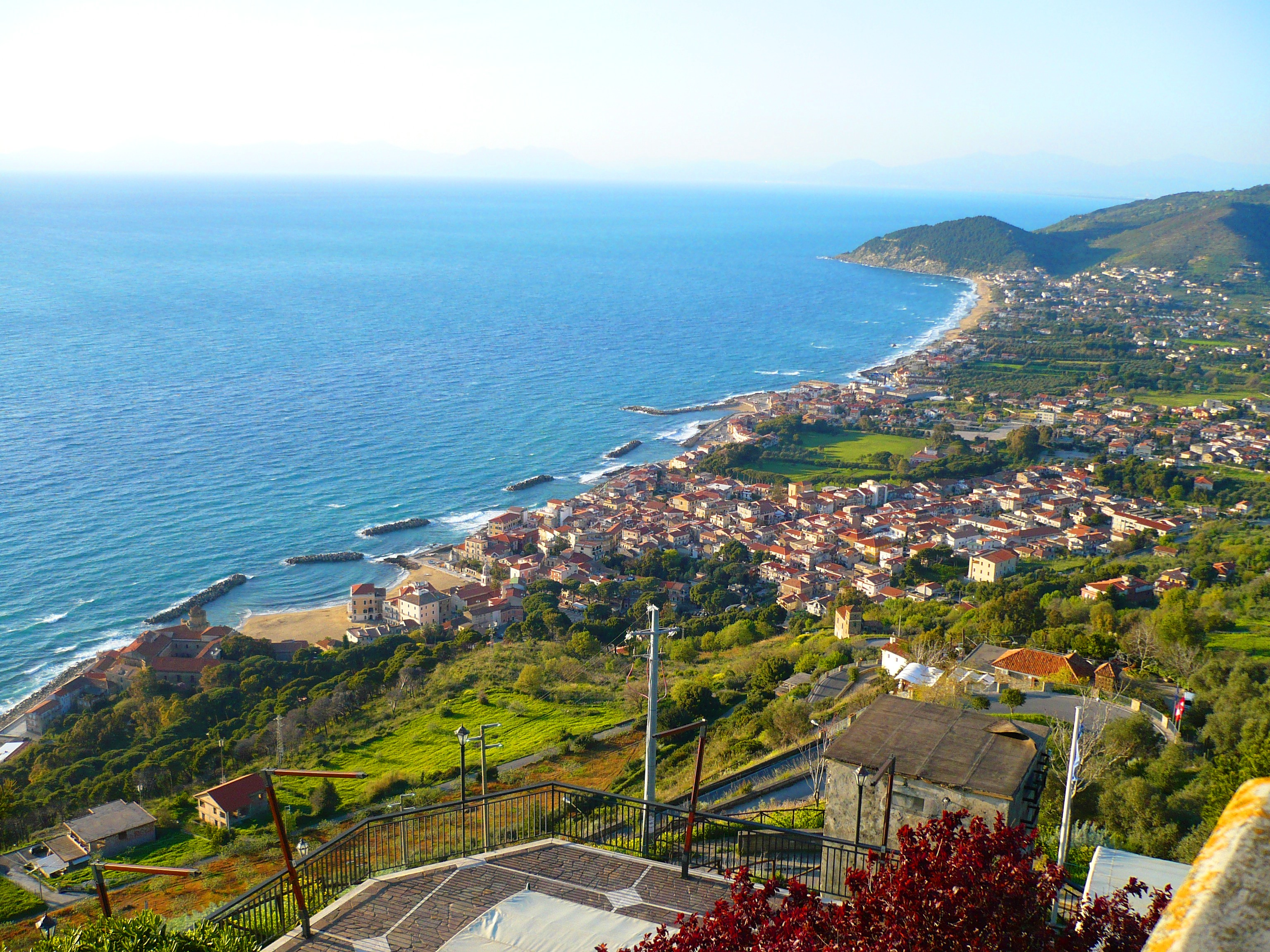

- Location of Santa Maria di Castellabate in Italy
- Coordinates: 40°17′18.17″N 14°56′54.28″E
- Country: Italy
- Region: Campania
- Province: Salerno (SA)
- Comune: Castellabate
- Elevation: 10 m (33 ft)

Population (2007)
  - Total: 4,000
- Demonym: Marinesi
- Time zone: UTC+1 (CET)
  - Summer (DST): UTC+2 (CEST)
- Postal code: 84048
- Dialing code: (+39) 0974

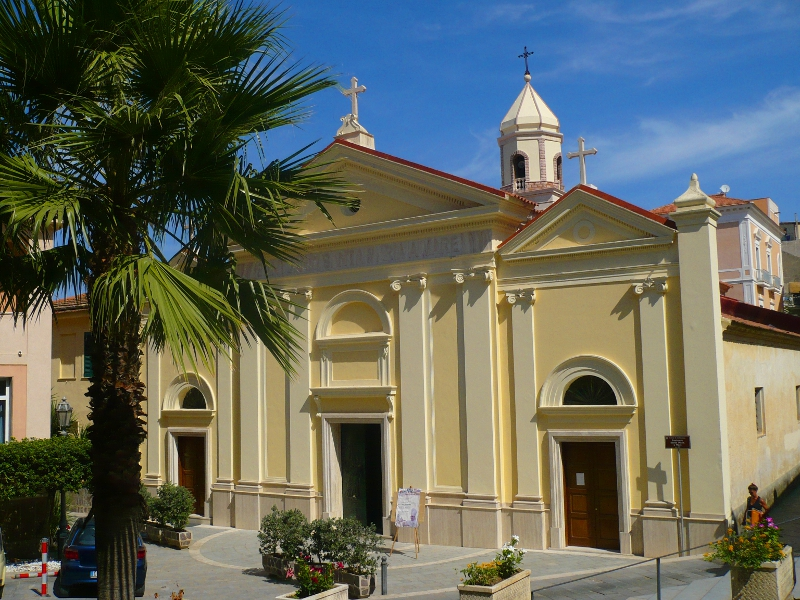
Santa Maria a Mare Sanctuary

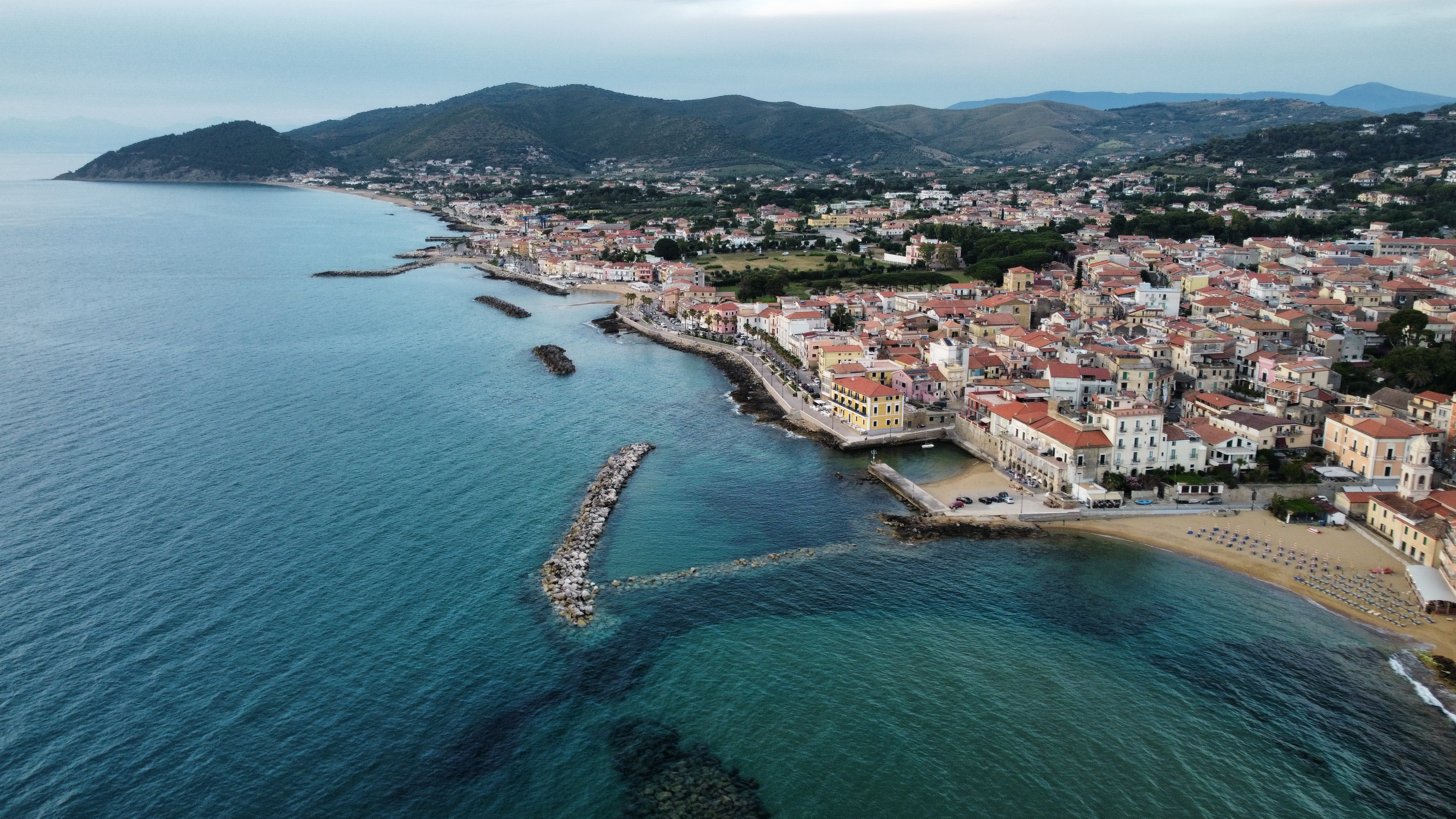
Aerial view of Santa Maria di Castellabate

Santa Maria di Castellabate (Cilentan: A Marina) is a southern Italian town and hamlet (frazione) of Castellabate, a municipality in the province of Salerno, Campania. It is the most populated frazione of its comune and the seat of the town hall building.

== History ==
The town was known in the 18th century as "Isca delle Chitarre", its original area and now the old town. The downtown is extended by two squares, Piazza Matarazzo and Piazza Lucia and the oldest houses are located in front of the little harbour in a place named "Porte le Gatte".

== Geography ==
Santa Maria lies in the central-northern side of Cilento, alongside the Tyrrhenian Sea, and is extended from the zone of Lago, to the beach of Pozzillo. The town is only 3 km away from the old town of Castellabate, 12 from Agropoli, 20 from Acciaroli and 60 from Salerno. The town has a little harbour, the greatest port in the comune is at the nearer hamlet of San Marco.

== Tourism ==
The town is a part of "Cilento and Vallo di Diano National Park", its natural environment is composed of "Maquis", which is typical of mediterranean countries. It attracts a lot of tourism, especially in summer, because of good road links to Agropoli, Salerno and Naples and because of the quality of its water; which give it the Blue Flag beach award every year from 2003.

== Media ==
Benvenuti al Sud, an Italian adaptation of the 2008 French film Bienvenue chez les Ch'tis, has been set in Castellabate and partly in Santa Maria and San Marco.

== Gallery ==
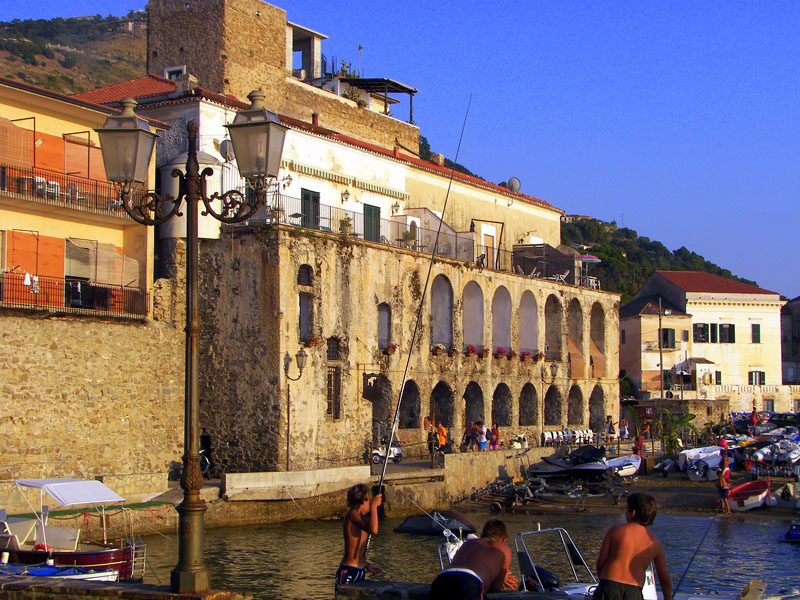
The portico of "Porte delle Gatte" and the little port

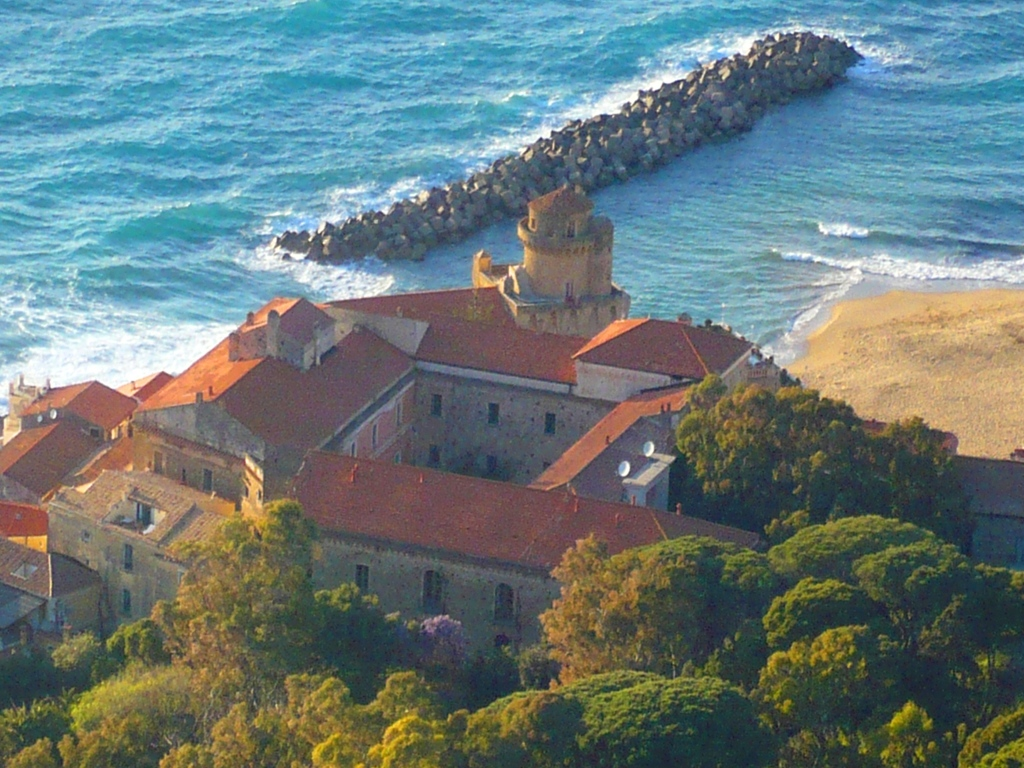
Belmonte Palace

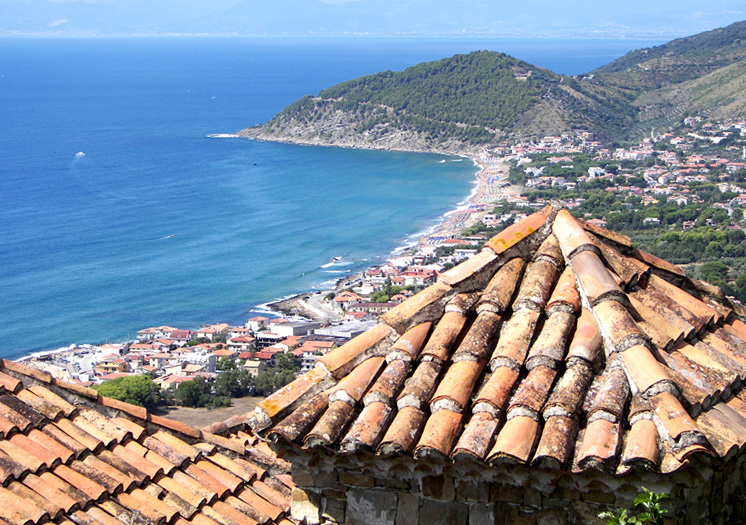
View of Lago and Tresino hills

== See also ==
- Castellabate
- Cilentan dialect
- Cilento and Vallo di Diano National Park
