= Magliano Nuovo =

- Frazione
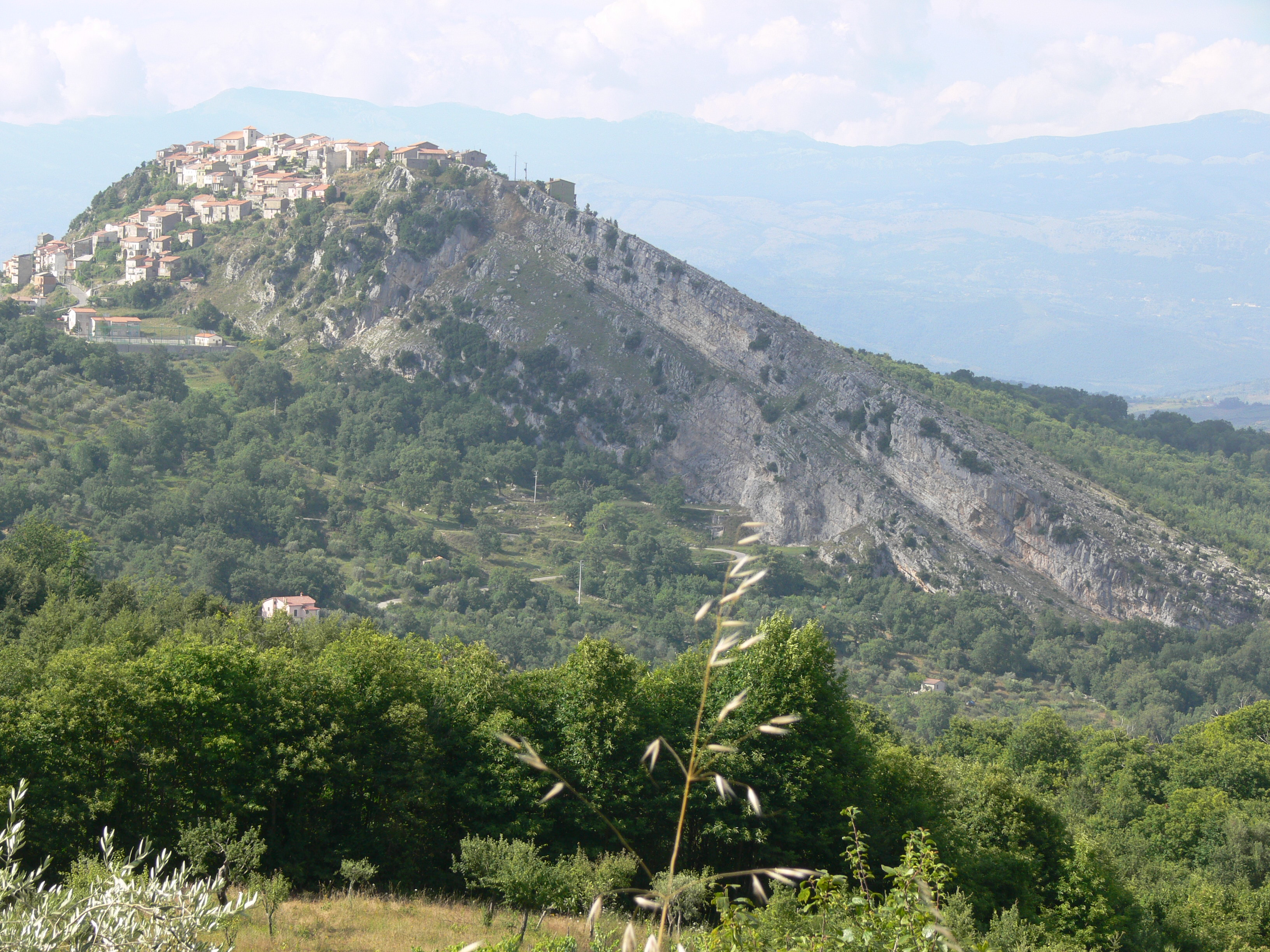

- Location of Magliano Nuovo in Italy
- Coordinates: 40°20′12.3″N 15°15′26.1″E
- Country: Italy
- Region: Campania
- Province: Salerno (SA)
- Comune: Magliano Vetere
- Elevation: 700 m (2,300 ft)

Population (2011)
  - Total: 334
- Demonym: Maglianesi
- Time zone: UTC+1 (CET)
  - Summer (DST): UTC+2 (CEST)
- Postal code: 84050
- Dialing code: (+39) 0974
- Patron saint: St. Irene

Magliano Nuovo is a southern Italian village and hamlet (frazione) of Magliano Vetere, a municipality in the province of Salerno, Campania. As of 2011, its population was 334.

== History ==
The village was the site of an ancient Goth castle, built in the 6th century, conquered by the Lombards and after by the Normans. During the Middle Ages, it was purchased by the noble houses of Sanseverino, Carafa and Pasca. The site was resettled in 1669, when a fire damaged Magliano and the survivors built a new village there, naming it Magliano Nuovo ("New Magliano"). When, some years later, the original site was rebuilt, it took the name of Magliano Vetere ("Old Magliano").

== Geography ==
Located in the middle of Cilento and transcluded into its national park, Magliano Nuovo lies above a mountain (700 m) between the valleys of the rivers Alento and Calore Lucano, 3 km west of Magliano Vetere. A detached quarter, named Palazzo Soccorso (40°20′06.9″N 15°15′00.2″E), lies below the old town, at an altitude of 600 m, and spans on the national highway SR 488.

Magliano is 4 km far from Gorga, 5 from Capizzo and Stio, 8 from Monteforte Cilento, 13 from Laurino and Campora, 18 from Felitto and Vallo della Lucania, and 37 from Agropoli.

== Main sights ==
- The "Magliano Nuovo - Postiglione" mountain path for trekking lover
- The Medieval Bridge over the river
- The Goth Castle, built in the 6th century in the highest point of the village
- The Assumption of Mary Church (Santa Maria dell'Assunta)
- The "Preta Perciata", an underground mountain pass built in the 11th century connecting the valleys of Alento and Calore

== Gallery ==
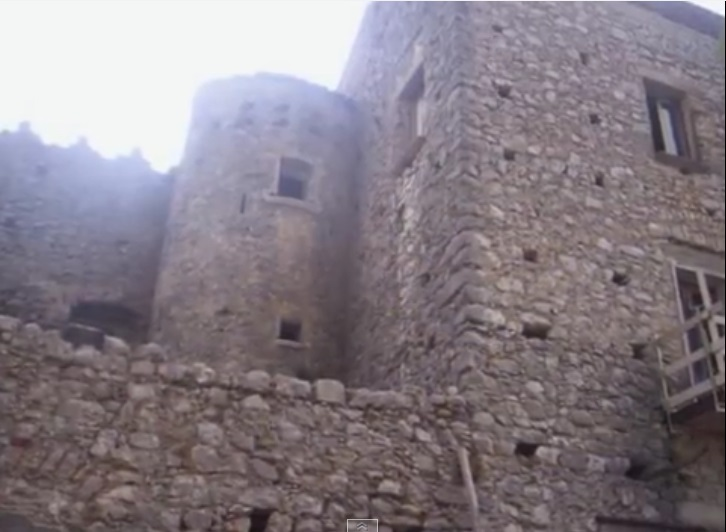
View of the Goth Castle

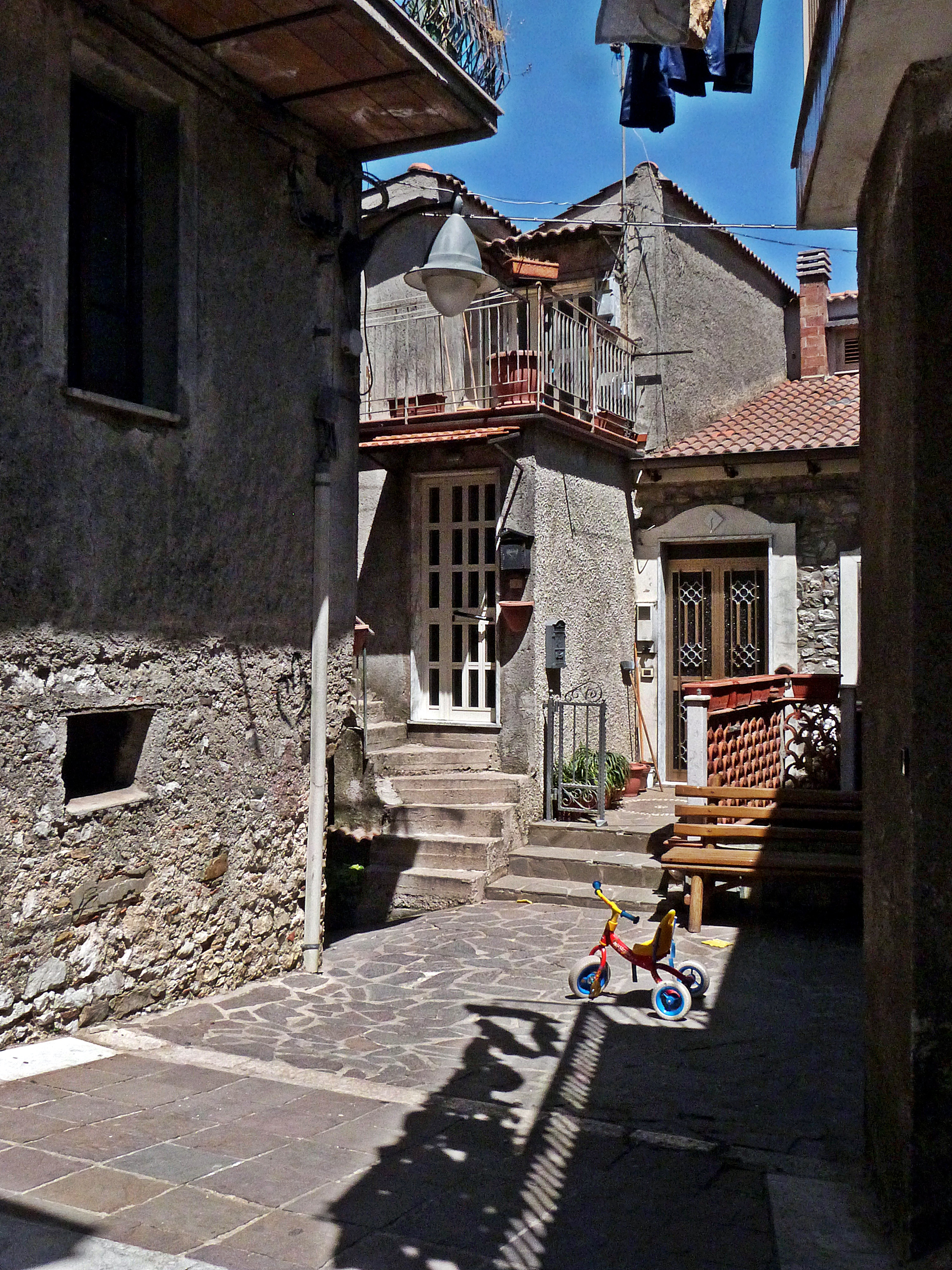
A street in the old town

== See also ==
- Cilentan dialect
