= Piano Vetrale =

- Frazione
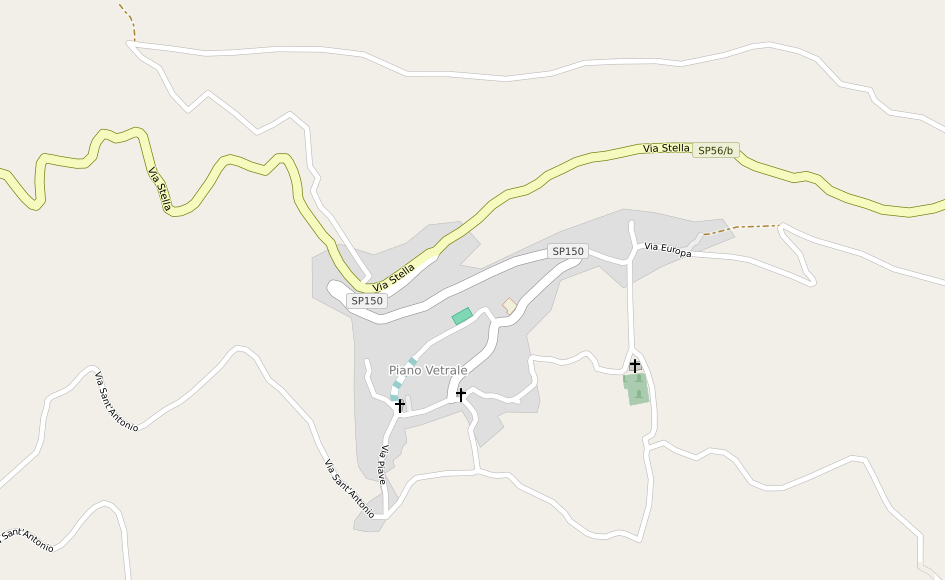
- OSM map of Piano Vetrale

- Location of Piano Vetrale in Italy
- Coordinates: 40°18′15.9″N 15°12′04.1″E
- Country: Italy
- Region: Campania
- Province: Salerno (SA)
- Comune: Orria
- Elevation: 575 m (1,886 ft)

Population (2011)
  - Total: 475
- Demonym: Pianesi / Vetralesi
- Time zone: UTC+1 (CET)
  - Summer (DST): UTC+2 (CEST)
- Postal code: 84060
- Dialing code: (+39) 0974
- Patron saint: St. Elias
- Saint day: Last sunday of July

Piano Vetrale, also shortened as Vetrale or Piano, is a southern Italian village and hamlet (frazione) of Orria, a municipality in the province of Salerno, Campania. As of 2011, its population was of 475.

== History ==
The origin of the toponym comes from Planus (referred to the high plain in which it lies) and Veteres (referred to its founders, some veterans of the Roman army from Gioi). The village, originally named Piano del Cilento, is part of the municipality of Orria since 1801 and was divided into two separated settlements (Piano and Vetrale) until the 1960s.

== Culture ==
Piano Vetrale became a "painted town" with large murales outside the houses, at the end of the 1970s, following the idea of the Sicilian artist Pino Crisanti.

== Geography ==
Located in the middle of Cilento and transcluded into its national park, Piano Vetrale is a hill village that spans on a ridge upon the valley of Alento river's source. It is divided into the quarters of Piano (west) and Vetrale (east), contiguous and divided by a little valley, named Vallone di Sabato.

Piano Vetrale lies between Orria (3.5 km west), Gioi (4 km southeast) and Stio (6.5 km east), and is connected to them by the provincial road SP56/B. The village is 7.3 km far from Perito, 7.7 from Ostigliano, 8 from Gorga, 9 from Cardile, 10 from Casino Lebano (the other hamlet of Orria), and 17 from Vallo della Lucania.

== Main sights ==
- St. Sophia's Church and its bell tower
- The murales within the village

== Personalities ==
- Paolo de Matteis (1662-1728), painter

== See also ==
- Cilentan dialect
