= Magliano =

Magliano may refer to several places in Italy:

== Municipalities (comuni) ==
- Magliano Alfieri, in the province of Cuneo, Piedmont
- Magliano Alpi, in the province of Cuneo, Piedmont
- Magliano de' Marsi, in the province of L'Aquila, Abruzzo
- Magliano di Tenna, in the province of Ascoli Piceno, Marche
- Magliano in Toscana, in the province of Grosseto, Tuscany
- Magliano Romano, in the province of Rome, Lazio
- Magliano Sabina, in the province of Rieti, Lazio
- Magliano Vetere, in the province of Salerno, Campania

== Hamlets (frazioni) ==
- Magliano (Carmiano), in the municipality of Carmiano (LE), Apulia
- Magliano (Torricella Sicura), in the municipality of Torricella Sicura (TE), Abruzzo
- Magliano Nuovo, in the municipality of Magliano Vetere (SA), Campania

== See also ==
- Ania Magliano, British comedian, born 1998
- Santa Croce di Magliano, an Italian municipality of the province of Campobasso, Molise
