= Ostigliano =

- Frazione
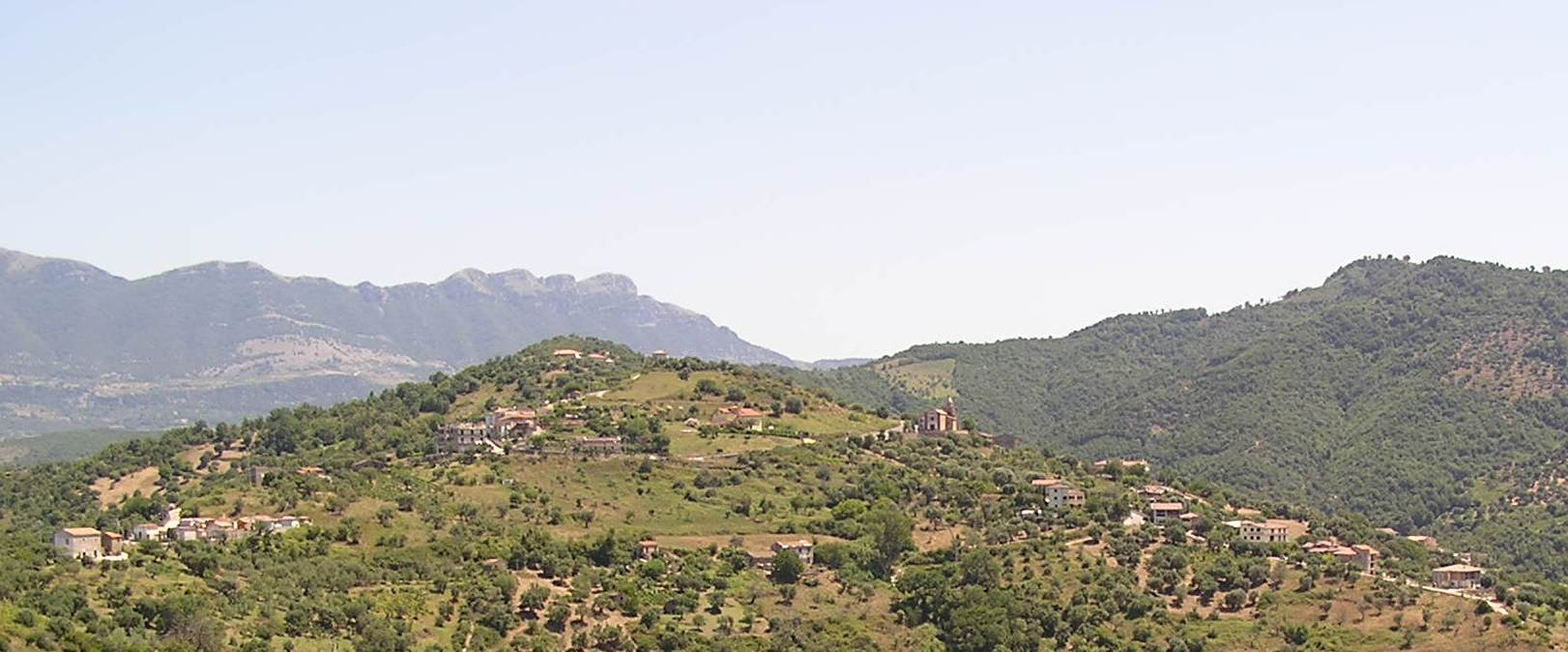

- Location of Ostigliano in Italy
- Coordinates: 40°18′53.3″N 15°08′37.4″E
- Country: Italy
- Region: Campania
- Province: Salerno (SA)
- Comune: Perito
- Elevation: 465 m (1,526 ft)

Population (2011)
  - Total: 431
- Demonym: Ostiglianesi
- Time zone: UTC+1 (CET)
  - Summer (DST): UTC+2 (CEST)
- Postal code: 84060
- Dialing code: (+39) 0974
- Patron saint: St. John the Baptist
- Saint day: 24 June

Ostigliano is a southern Italian village and the only hamlet (frazione) of Perito, a municipality in the province of Salerno, Campania. As of 2011, its population was 431.

== History ==
The village, whose toponym comes from the Latin word Hostilius, was settled since the Middle Ages. Its main church, dedicated to John the Baptist, was built during the 16th century.

== Geography ==
Located in central-northern Cilento and transcluded into its national park, Ostigliano spans above a hill, on a ridge between the valley and the reservoir of Alento river, and the nearby hilltown of Perito (6 km far).

It is 7.7 km far from Piano Vetrale, 8 from Orria, 10 from Rutino, 14 from Cicerale, 19 from Agropoli; and 4 from the exit "Perito" of the national highway SS18/var.

== Gallery ==
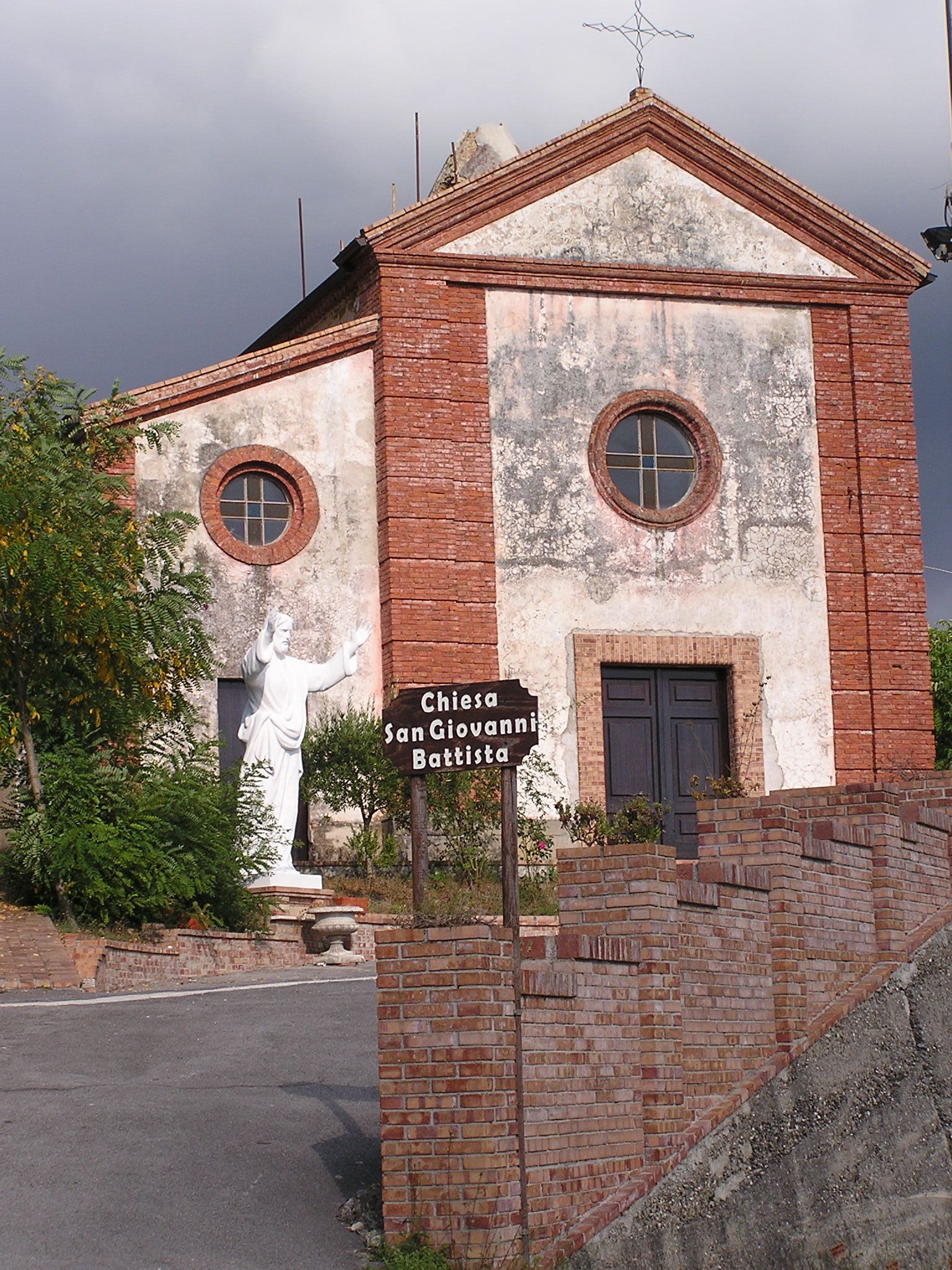
St. John the Baptist Church

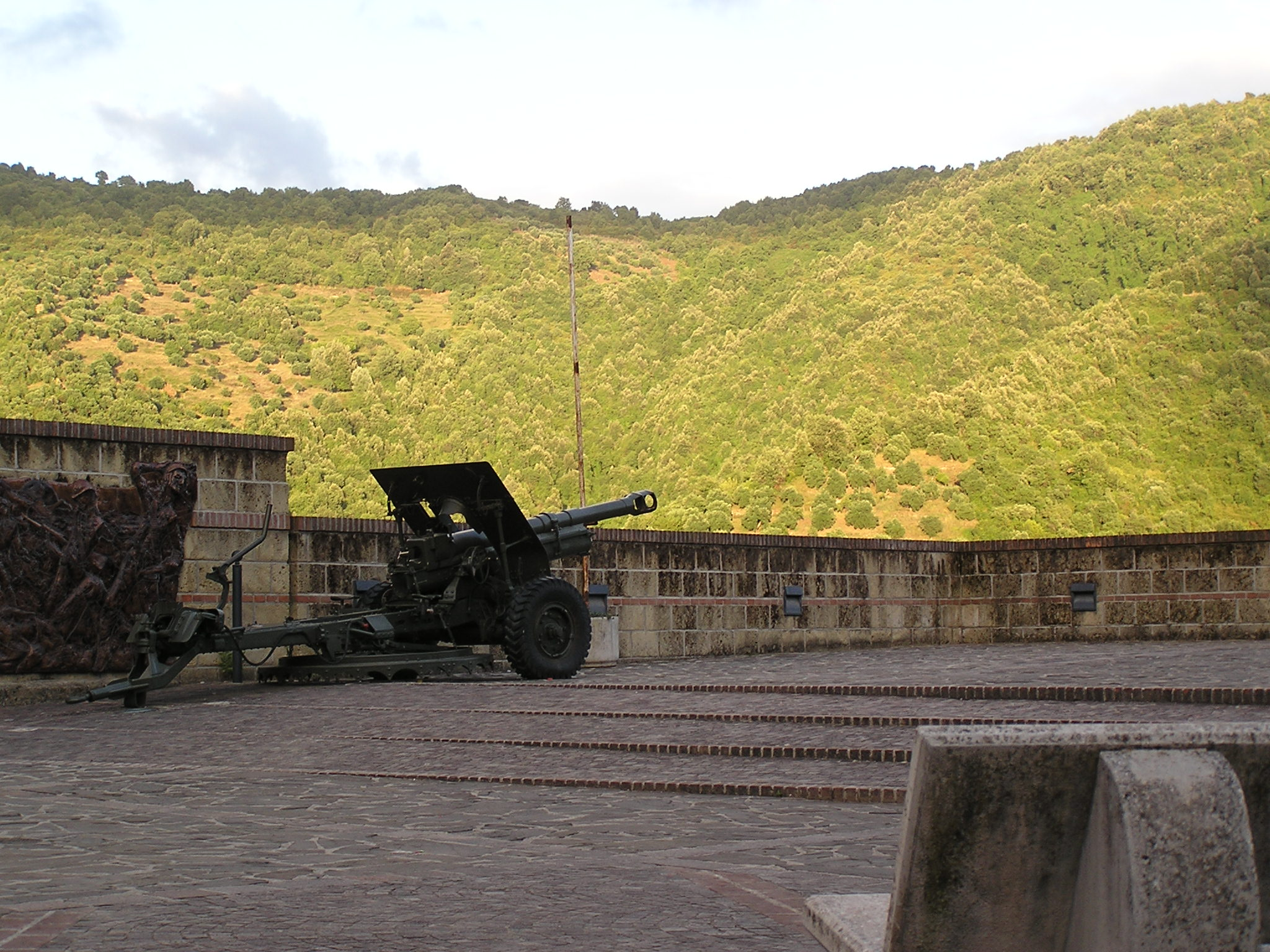
A cannon in the central square

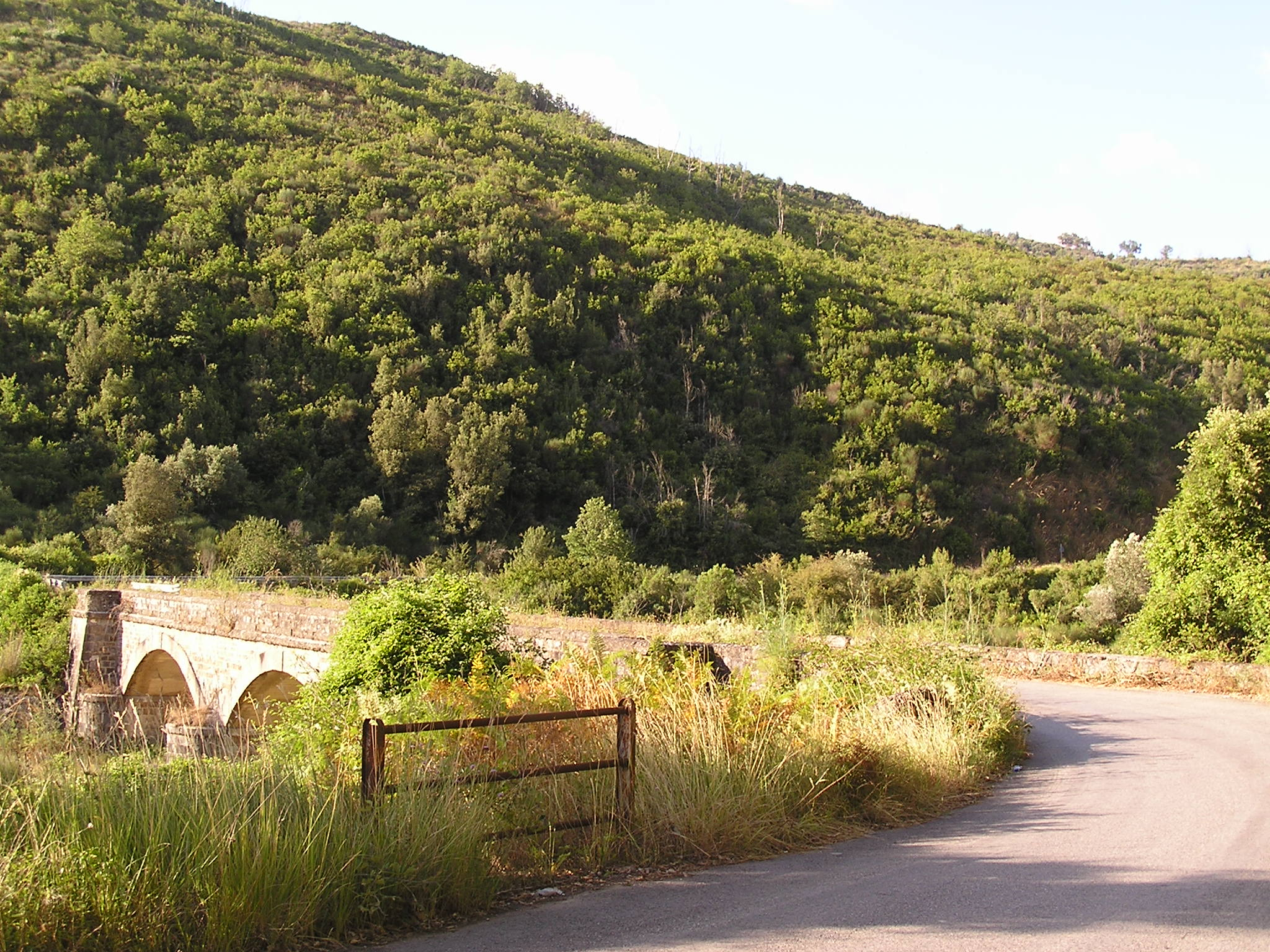
An old bridge near the village

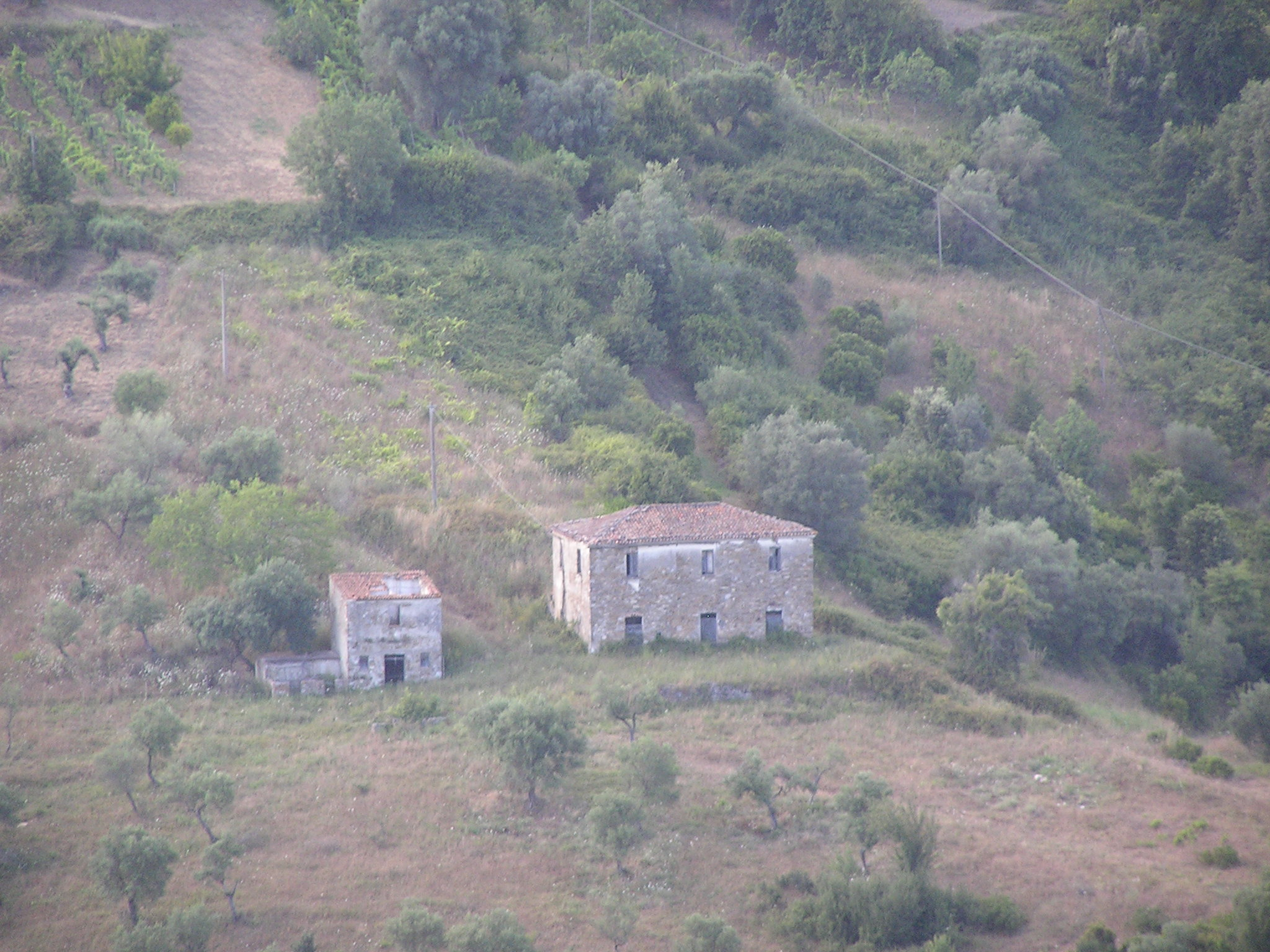
An old farmhouse near the village

== See also ==
- Cilentan dialect
