= Paolo de Matteis =

Italian painter (1662–1728)

Paolo de' Matteis
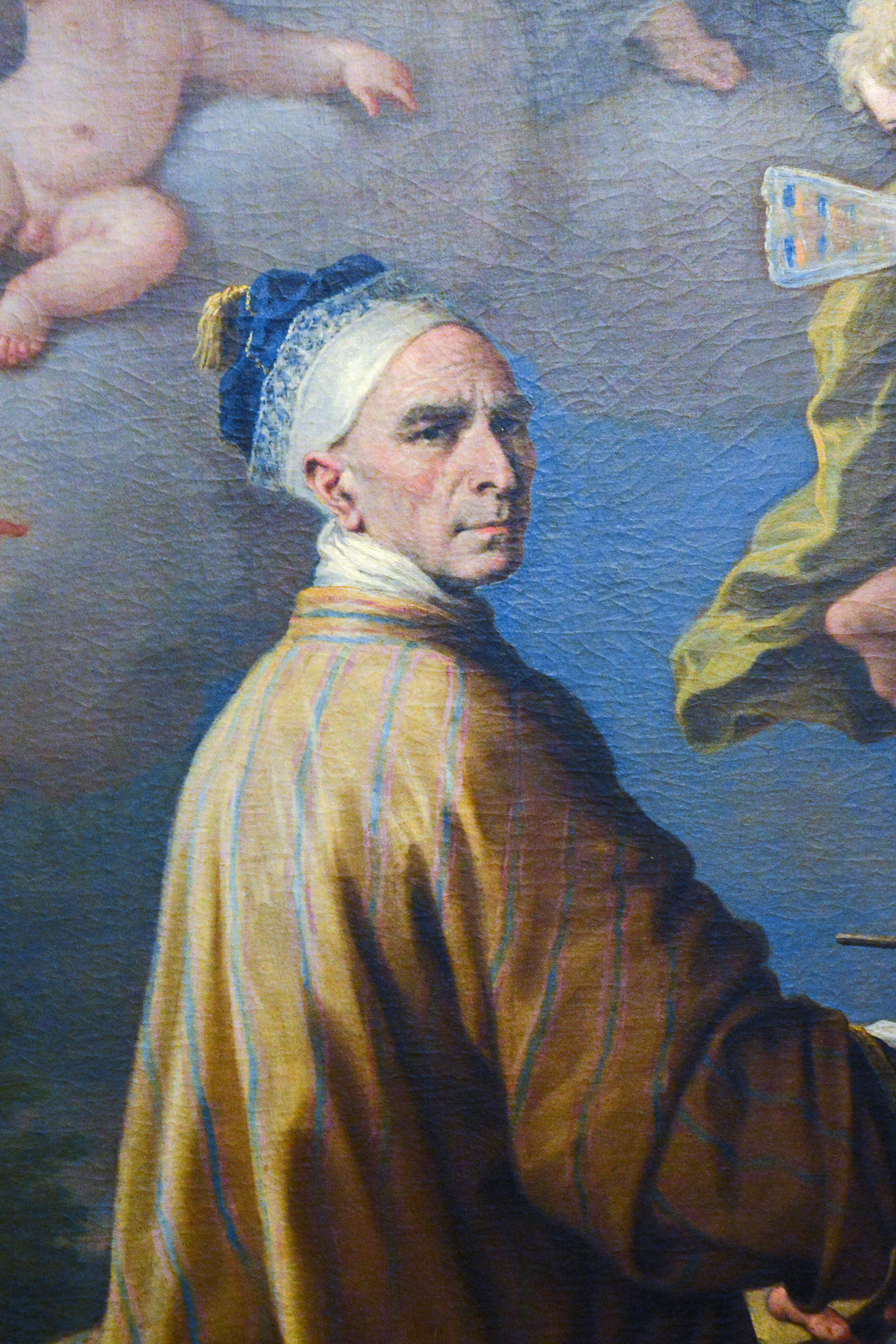
- Self-portrait
- Born: 9 February 1662; Piano Vetrale
- Died: 26 January 1728 (aged 65); Kingdom of Naples
- Known for: Painting
- Movement: Baroque

Paolo de Matteis (also known as Paolo de' Matteis; 9 February 1662 – 26 January 1728) was an Italian painter.

== Biography ==
He was born in Piano Vetrale, a hamlet of Orria, in the current Province of Salerno, and died in Naples. He trained with Francesco di Maria in Naples, then with Luca Giordano. According to Lanzi, Matteis was the best pupil of Giordano. He served in the employ of the Spanish Viceroy of Naples.

From 1702 to 1705, de' Matteis worked in Paris. When he returned to Italy, he worked in Rome for Popes Clement XI and XII and Benedict XIII. Notable works are those commissioned by Pope Benedict XIII for the churches of Santa Maria sopra Minerva and Santa Maria in Ara Coeli. He also spent time in Genoa, where he painted an Immaculate Conception for the church of San Girolamo.

Returning to Naples, he painted decorative schemes for Neapolitan churches, including the vault of the chapel of San Ignatius in the church of Gesù Nuovo in Naples. He also painted an Assumption of the Virgin for the Abbey at Monte Cassino. Between 1723 and 1725, de' Matteis lived in Rome, where he received a commission from Pope Innocent XIII.

He had as pupils Filippo Falciatore, Francesco Peresi, and members of the Sarnelli family including Francesco, Gennaro, Giovanni, and Antonio Sarnelli. Others who were his pupils were Giuseppe Mastroleo, Giovanni Pandozzi, Michelangelo Buonocore, Domenico Guarino, Antonio Fumo and Nicola de Filippis.

== Gallery ==
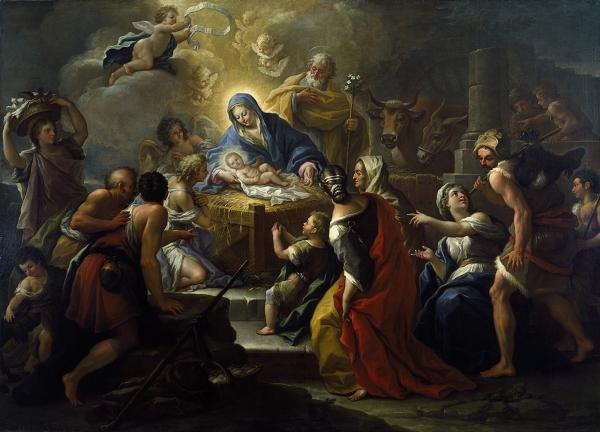
The Adoration of the Shepherds,
Dallas Museum of Art

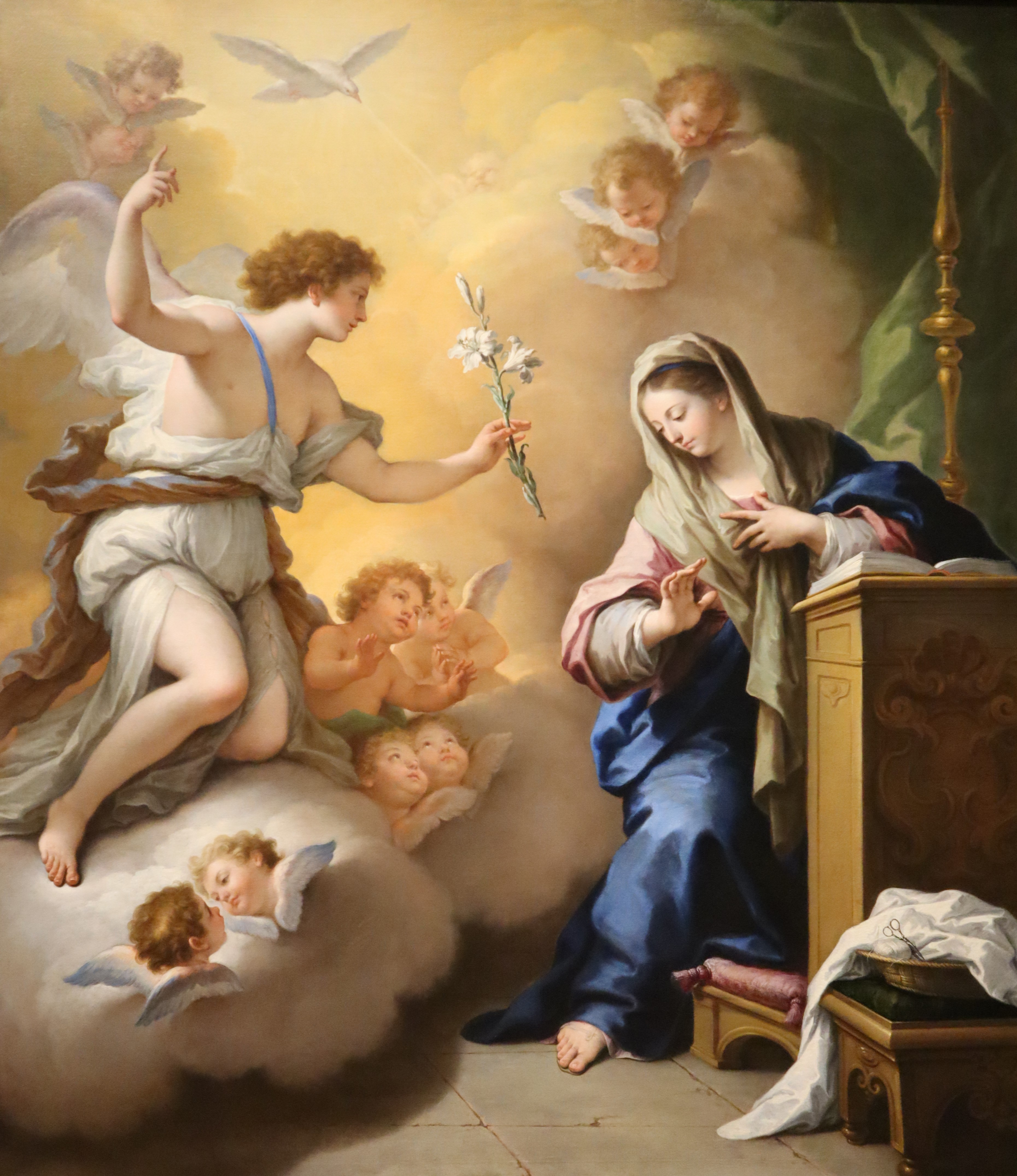
The Annunciation (1712)

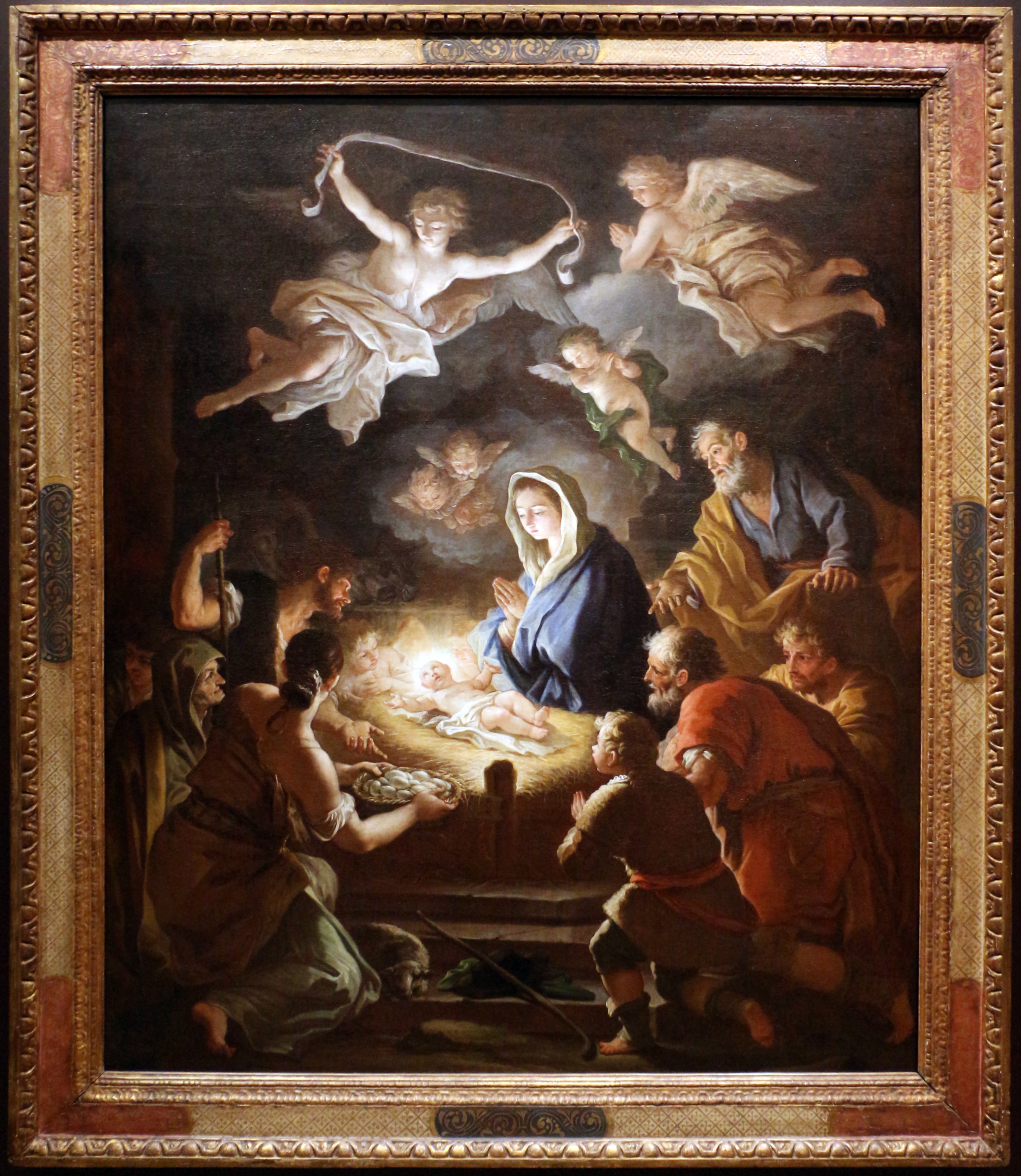
Adoration of the Shepherds (1710–15)

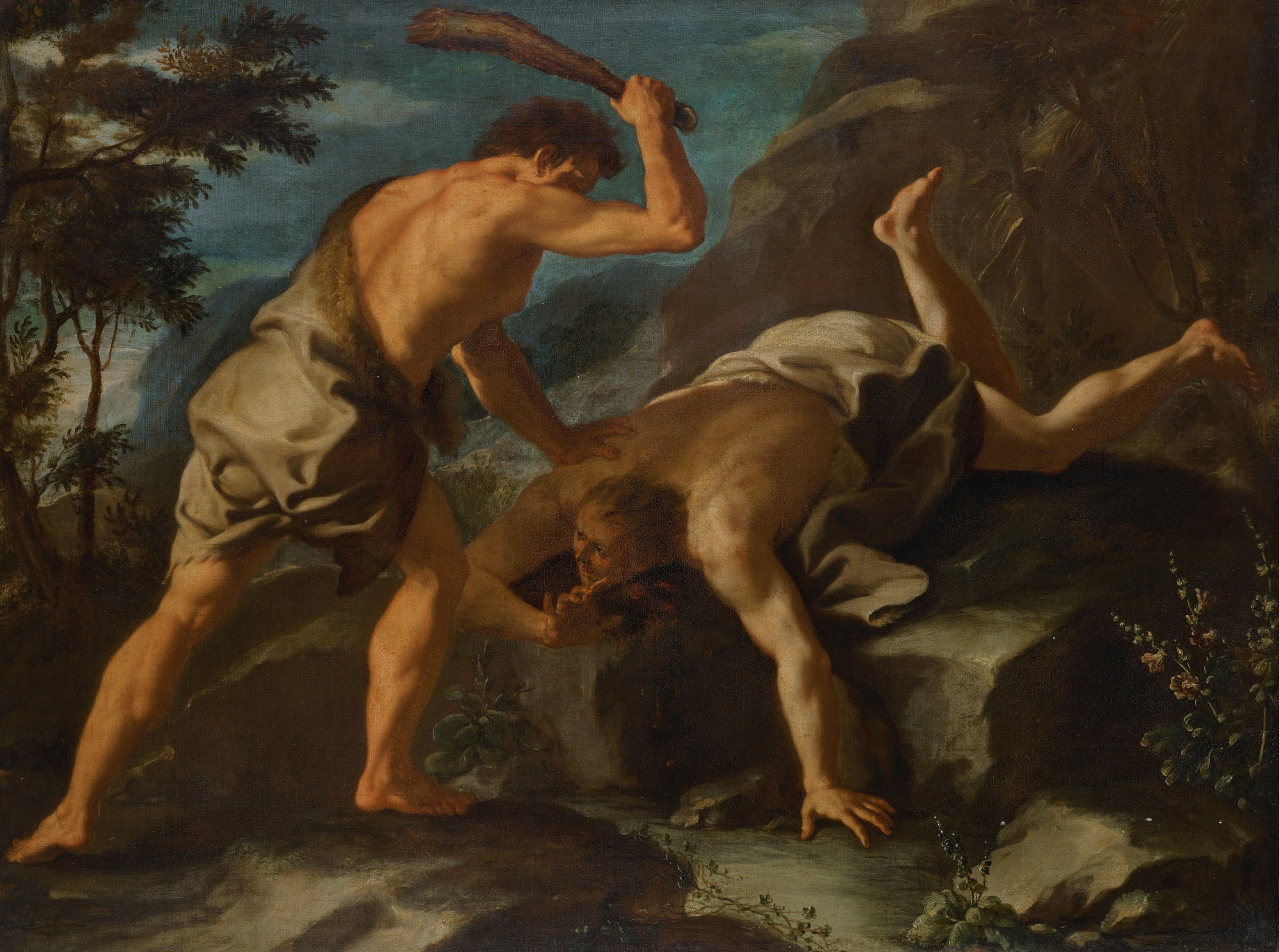
Cain and Abel (1690)

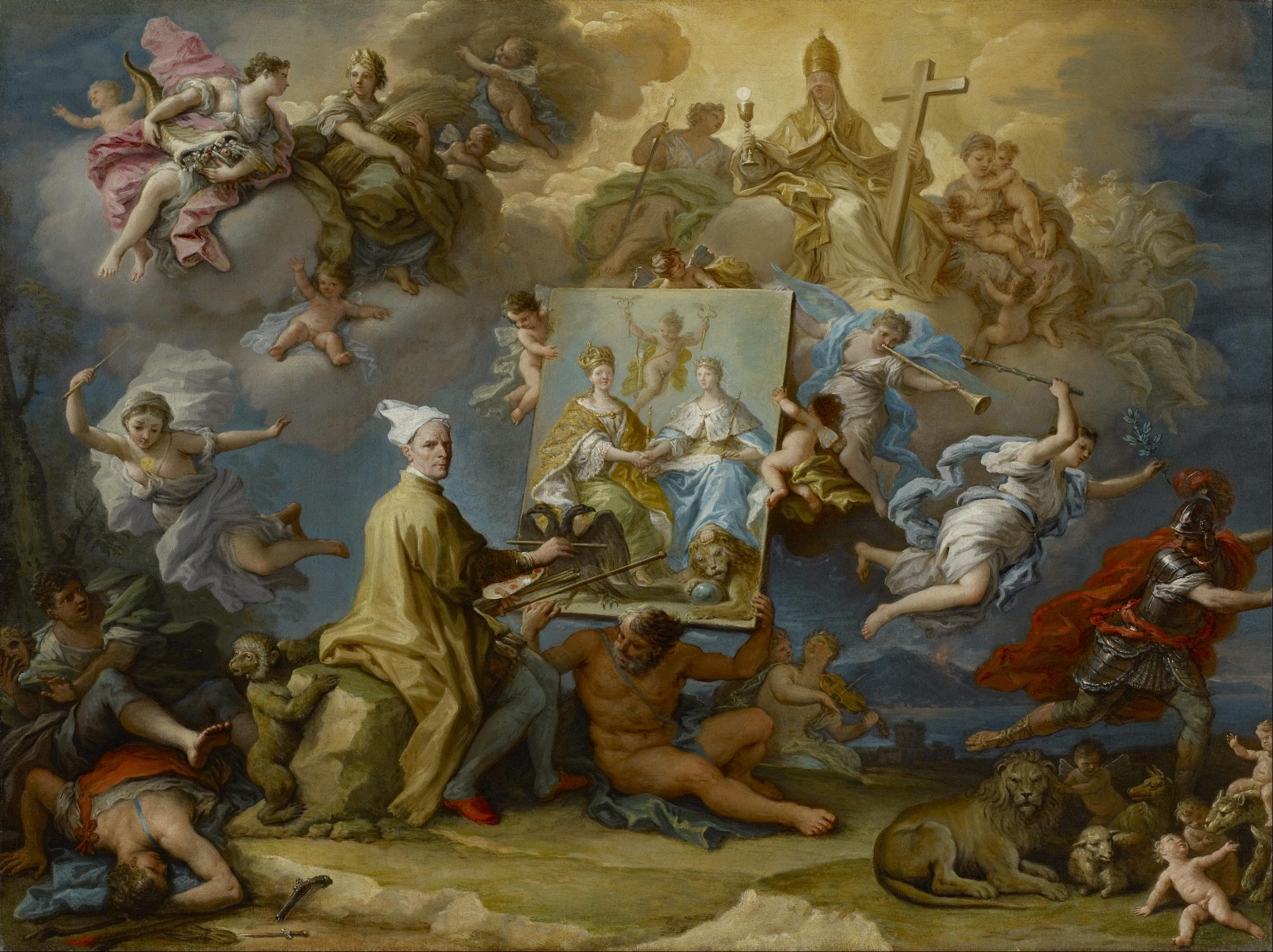
Allegory of the Consequences of the Peace of Utrecht

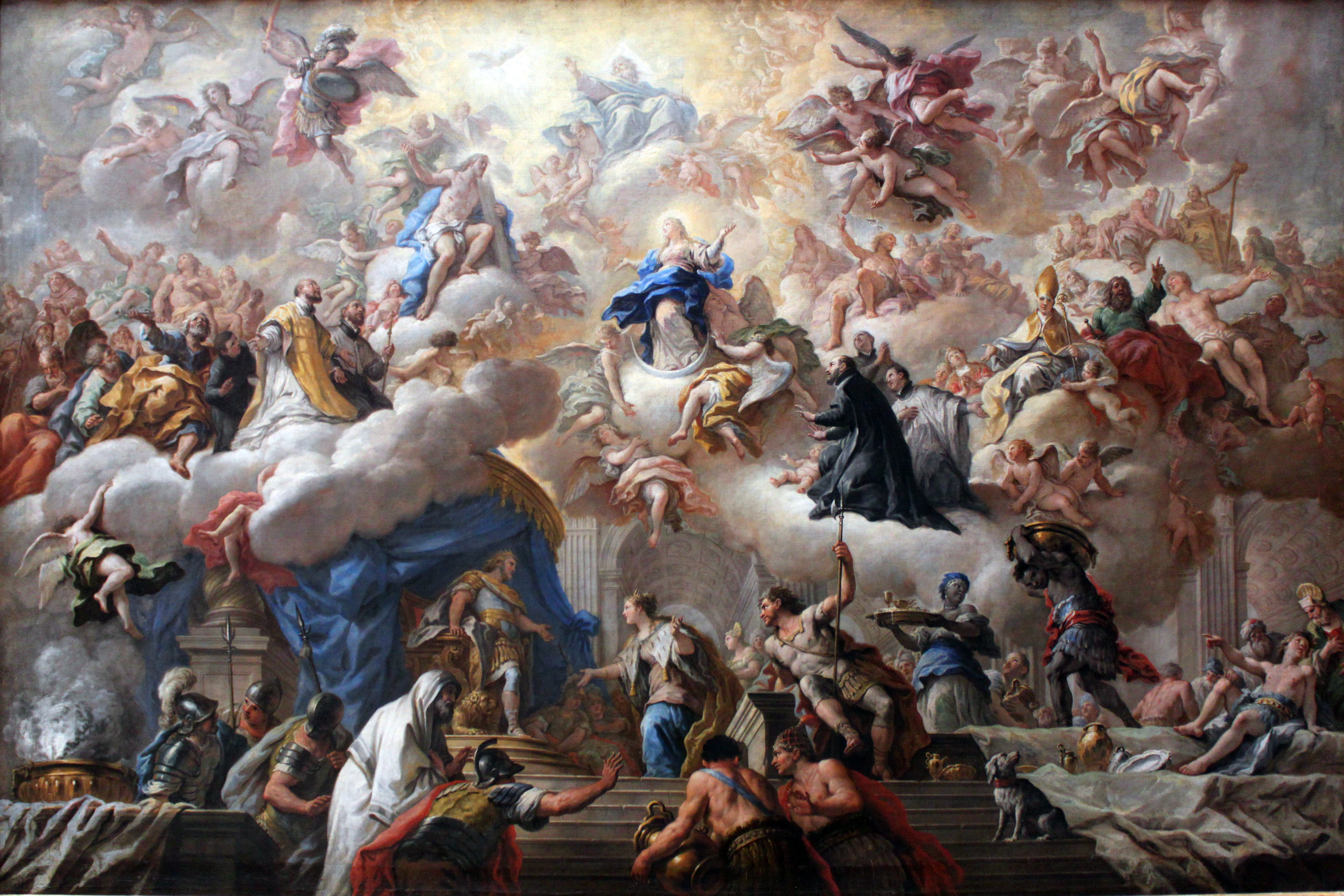
The Triumph of the Immaculate

== See also ==
- Santa Maria di Montesanto, Naples, for one of his works
- In 1996, the United States Postal Service issued a Christmas stamp based on his Adoration of the Shepherds.

== Bibliography ==
- Artnet biography from Grove encyclopedia of Art.
- Getty Museum biography.
- Hobbes, James R. (1849). Picture collector's manual; Dictionary of Painters. London: T. & W. Boone. pp. 153.
