= Gorga, Stio =

Gorga
- Frazione
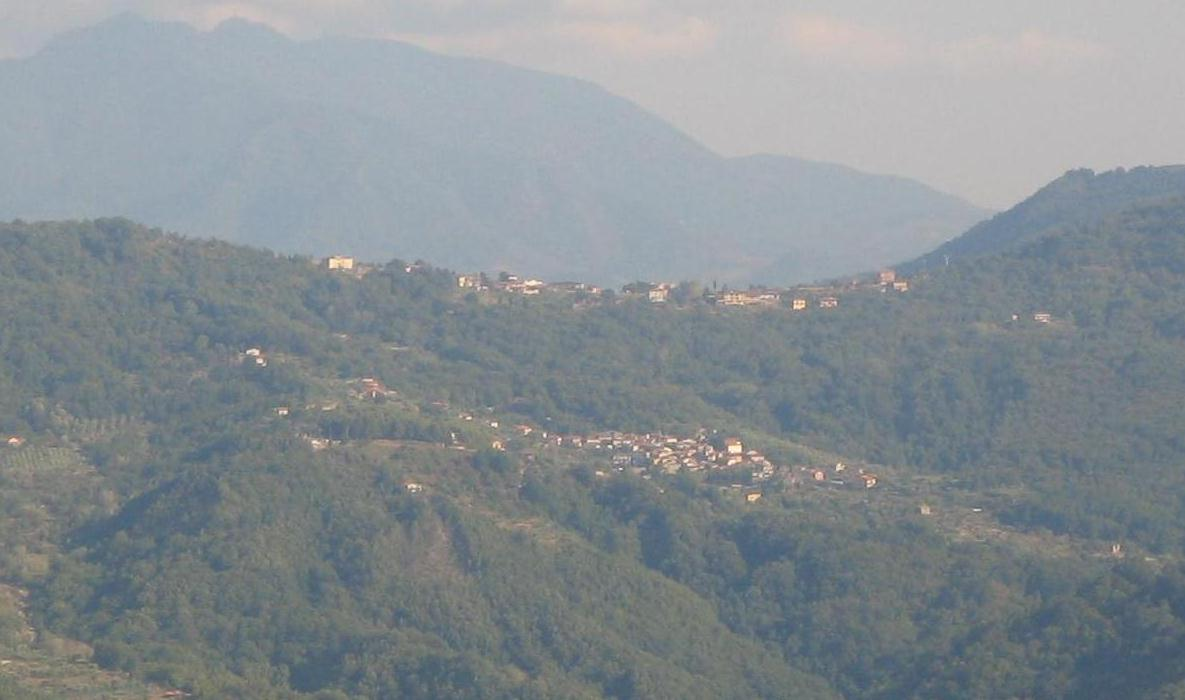
- View of Gorga with (above) Piano del Rosario, the upper quarter of Stio

- Location of Gorga in Italy
- Coordinates: 40°18′59.17″N 15°14′26.33″E
- Country: Italy
- Region: Campania
- Province: Salerno (SA)
- Comune: Stio
- Elevation: 568 m (1,864 ft)

Population (2016)
  - Total: 160
- Demonym: Gorghesi
- Time zone: UTC+1 (CET)
  - Summer (DST): UTC+2 (CEST)
- Postal code: 84075
- Dialing code: (+39) 0974
- Patron saint: St. Januarius

Gorga, also known as Gorga Cilento, is a southern Italian village and the only hamlet (frazione) of Stio, a municipality in the province of Salerno, Campania. As of 2016, its population was 160.

== History ==
The village was originally settled in the 12th century by Basilian monks, and grew as a village during the Middle Ages. Part of Magliano Vetere as a casale, it was aggregated to the municipality of Stio in early 19th century.

== Geography ==
Located in the middle of Cilento and transcluded into its national park, Gorga is a hill village that spans below Le Corne mountain, next to the source of the river Alento, and 3 km north of Stio. It is 4 km far from Magliano Nuovo, 6 from Magliano Vetere, 8 from Piano Vetrale, Gioi and Campora, and 16 from Vallo della Lucania.

== Main sights ==
The principal sights of Gorga are the ruins of the church Grancia di San Lucido (12th century), the central church of St. Januarius; and the Chapel of Our Lady of the Health (Madonna della Sanità, 16th century), situated in the locality of Oliceta.

== Personalities ==
- Raffaele Lettieri (1881–1957), politician and academic
- Antonino Maria Stromillo (1786–1858), Catholic bishop, first one of the Diocese of Caltanissetta

== See also ==
- Cilentan dialect
