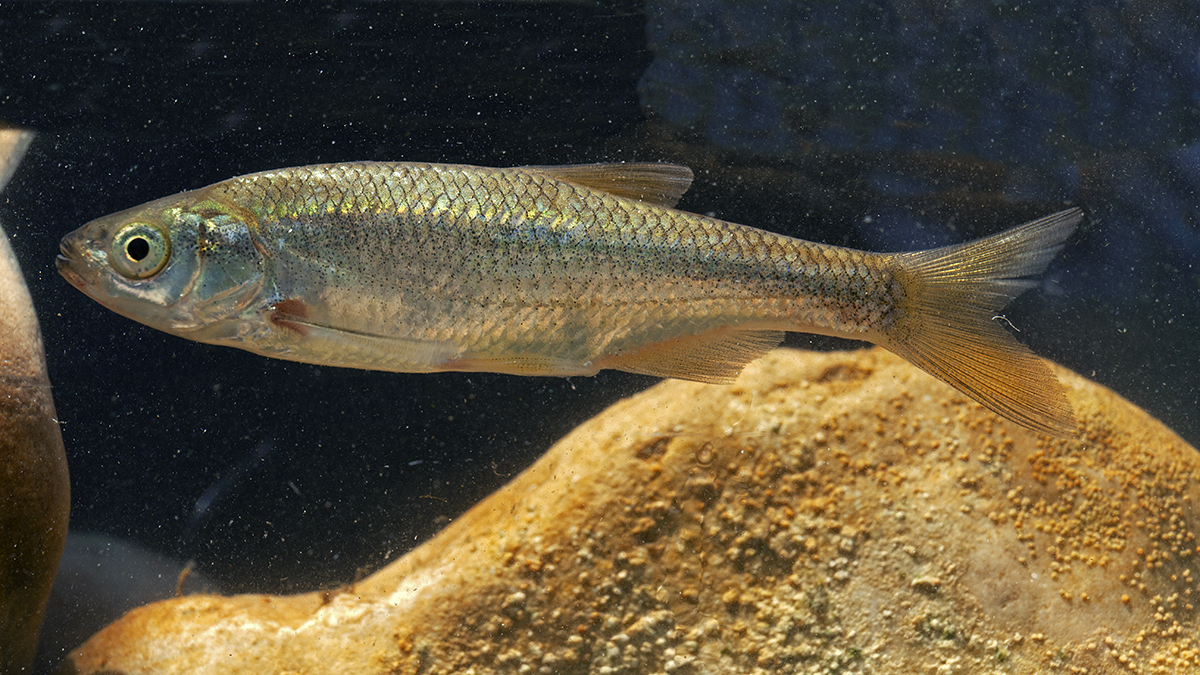
- Alburnus albidus

Conservation status
- Endangered (IUCN 3.1)

Scientific classification
- Kingdom: Animalia
- Phylum: Chordata
- Class: Actinopterygii
- Order: Cypriniformes
- Family: Leuciscidae
- Genus: Alburnus
- Species: A. albidus

Binomial name
- Alburnus albidus (Costa, 1838)

Synonyms
- Alburnus alburnus albidus (Costa, 1838); Leuciscus albidus Costa, 1838; Leuciscus cordilla Valenciennes, 1844; Leuciscus vulturius Costa, 1838

= Italian bleak =

Species of fish

The Italian bleak (Alburnus albidus) the Southern Italian bleak or white bleak, is a species of freshwater fish in the family Leuciscidae, which includes daces, minnows, and related fishes. This fish is endemic to southern Italy.

== Taxonomy ==
The Italian bleak was first formally described as Leuciscus albidus in 1838 by the Italian zoologist Oronzio Gabriele Costa with its type locality given as Campania, Cilento, from the Alento River near Fasana village in Italy. This taxon has been regarded as a subspecies of the common bleak (A. alburnus) but is now regarded as a valid species. The genus Alburnus is classified within the subfamily Leuciscinae of the family Leuciscidae.

== Etymology ==
The Italian bleak belongs to the genus Alburnus a name derived from the Latin for whitefish but it also refers to the bleak, a name which means pale in English, in reference to the pale non lustrous colour of A. alburnus. The specific name, albidus, is Latin and also means whitish or white.

== Description ==
The Italian bleak is distinguished from related species in Italy and the Balkans by having the origin of the anal fin immediately to the rear or below the last branched dorsal fin ray. The anal fin has between 11 and 13 1/2. The ventral keel is exposed between the anus and the base of the pelvic fin. In preserved specimens there is a faint stripe along the lateral line which extends to the base of the pelvic fin. The mouth is terminal. This species has a maximum standard length is 11 cm (4.3 in).

== Distribution and habitat ==
The Italian bleak is endemic to southern Italy where it is found in the rivers draining into the Adriatic and Ionian Seas between the Trigno to the Sinni river systems, and between the Volturno River to the Alento River on the Tyrrhenian side. It has been introduced to the Mingardo, Bussento, Noce, Lao, Savuto and Neto rivers. This fish is found in both larger river channels and smaller tributaries with moderate to low flow with gravel, stone or pebble streambeds, as well as in reservoirs.
