= Dingé =

Dingé Deinjaé (Gallo) Dingad (Breton)
- Commune
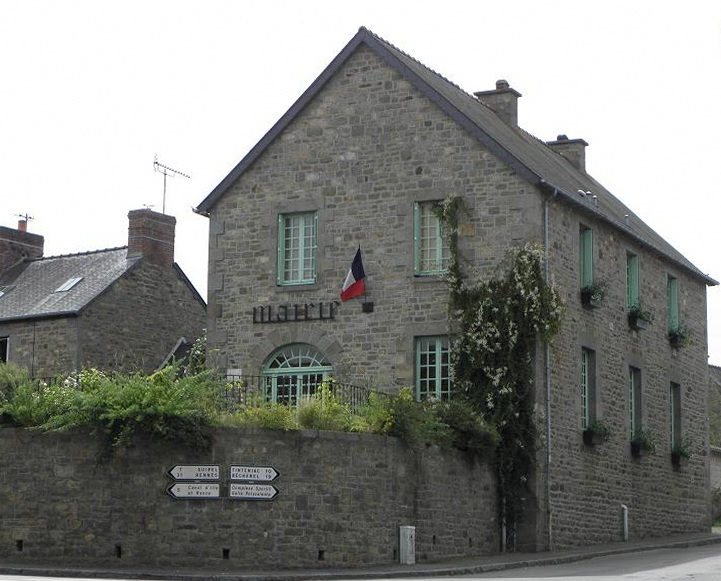
- Town hall
- Location of Dingé
- Location within France Location within Brittany
- Coordinates: 48°21′29″N 1°42′53″W
- Country: France
- Region: Brittany
- Department: Ille-et-Vilaine
- Arrondissement: Rennes
- Canton: Combourg
- Intercommunality: Bretagne Romantique

Government
  - Mayor (2022–2026): Annabelle Quentel
- Area^{1}: 52.89 km^{2} (20.42 sq mi)
- Highest elevation: 108 m (354 ft)
- Lowest elevation: 54 m (177 ft)
- Population (2023): 1,705
  - Density: 32.24/km^{2} (83.49/sq mi)
- Time zone: UTC+01:00 (CET)
  - Summer (DST): UTC+02:00 (CEST)
- INSEE/Postal code: 35094 /35440
- ^{1} French Land Register data, which excludes lakes, ponds, glaciers > 1 km^{2} (0.386 sq mi or 247 acres) and river estuaries.

Dingé (French pronunciation: [dɛ̃ʒe]; Breton: Dingad; Gallo: Deinjaé) is a commune in the Ille-et-Vilaine department in Brittany in northwestern France.

== Demographics ==
Inhabitants of Dingé are called Dingéens in French.

Historical population
| Year | Pop. | ±% p.a. |
|---|---|---|
| 1968 | 1,436 | — |
| 1975 | 1,259 | −1.86% |
| 1982 | 1,268 | +0.10% |
| 1990 | 1,265 | −0.03% |
| 1999 | 1,327 | +0.53% |
| 2007 | 1,493 | +1.48% |
| 2012 | 1,653 | +2.06% |
| 2017 | 1,636 | −0.21% |
| 2023 | 1,705 | +0.69% |
Source: INSEE

== Twin towns ==
- Stio (Italy)

== See also ==
- Communes of the Ille-et-Vilaine department
