= Giovanni Pandozzi =

Italian painter

Giovanni Pandozzi (Lenola, Province of Latina, 1711–1790) was an Italian painter.

== Biography ==
He was initially a pupil of Paolo De Matteis and then of Sebastiano Conca. Once Conca died, he moved to back to Lenola. He worked for the Church of Santa Chiara in Naples. There he painted in the choir of the monks and two altarpieces: one of Santa Chiara praying for the Edification of the Church and The Holy Eucharist being adored by Franciscan Saints.

He also painted works for the towns of Pico, Itri, Pastena, and Campodimele.
