= Monteforte Cilento =

- Comune
- Comune di Monteforte Cilento
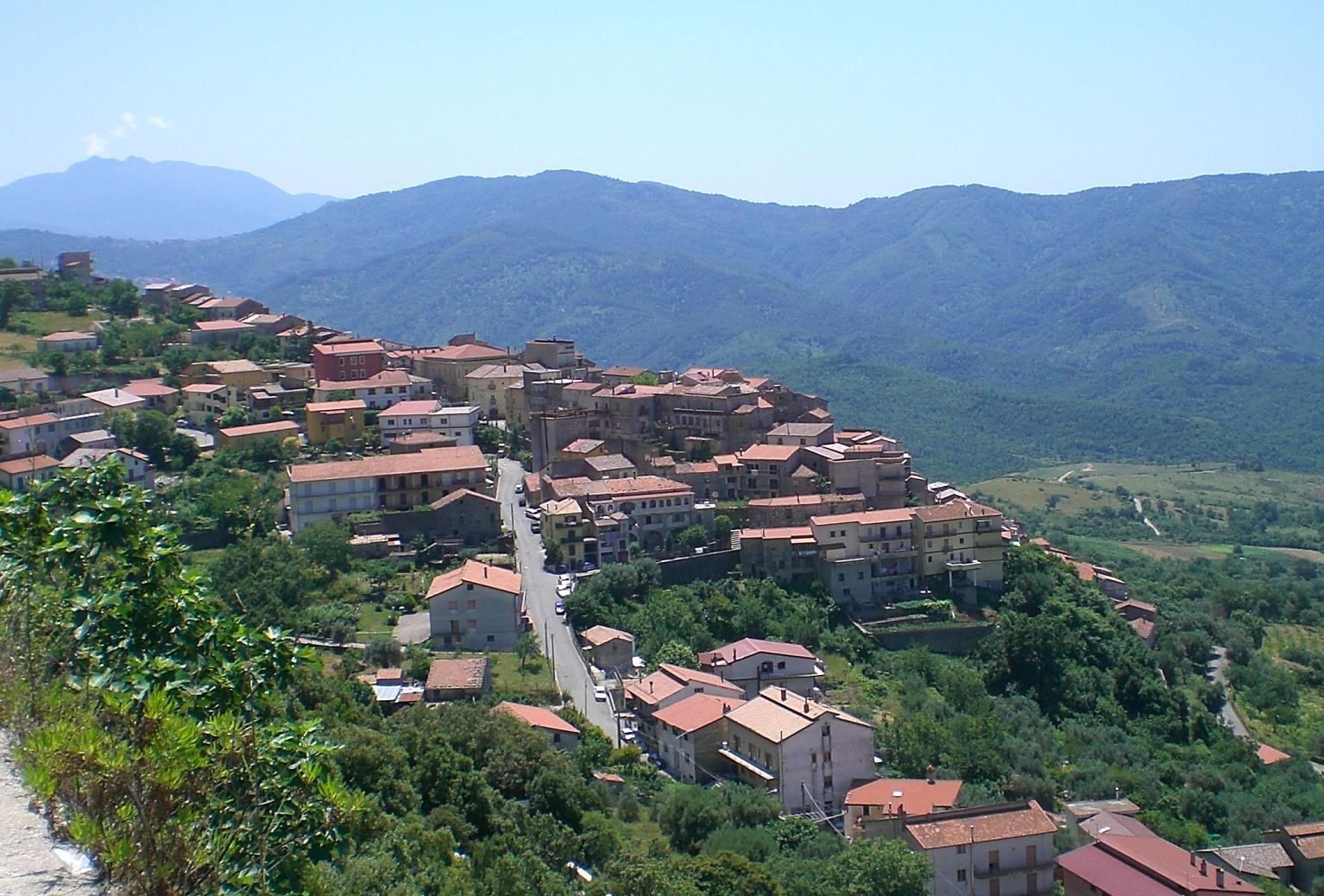

- Coat of arms

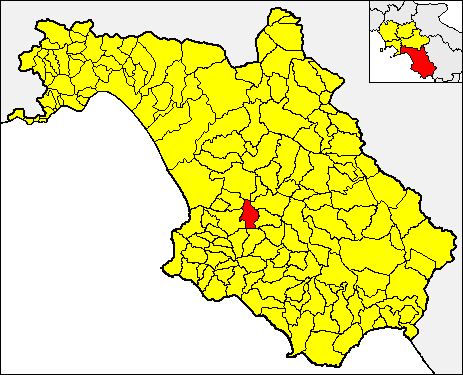
- Monteforte Cilento within the Province of Salerno

- Location within Italy Location within Campania
- Coordinates: 40°21′50.62″N 15°11′40.63″E
- Country: Italy
- Region: Campania
- Province: Salerno (SA)

Government
  - Mayor: Bernardo Mottola

Area
  - Total: 22.17 km^{2} (8.56 sq mi)
- Elevation: 600 m (2,000 ft)

Population (28 February 2017)
  - Total: 546
  - Density: 24.6/km^{2} (63.8/sq mi)
- Demonym: Montefortesi
- Time zone: UTC+1 (CET)
  - Summer (DST): UTC+2 (CEST)
- Postal code: 84060
- Dialing code: 0974
- Patron saint: St. Donatus of Arezzo
- Saint day: 7 August
- Website: Official website

Monteforte Cilento is a town and comune of the province of Salerno in the Campania region of south-west Italy.

== History ==
Monteforte was originally a Roman castrum, which expanded in the High Middle Ages after immigration due to the Saracen incursions.

It was one of the centers of the Moti del Cilento in 1828.

== Geography ==
Monteforte is a hill town located in northern Cilento, below Chianello mountain (1,319 m) and above the valley of Alento river. It lies on the provincial highway between Trentinara and Capizzo, a frazione of Magliano Vetere. The municipality borders with the municipalities of Cicerale, Felitto, Magliano Vetere, Orria, Perito, Roccadaspide and Trentinara.

== See also ==
- Cilentan dialect
- Cilento and Vallo di Diano National Park
