= Orria =

- Comune
- Comune di Orria
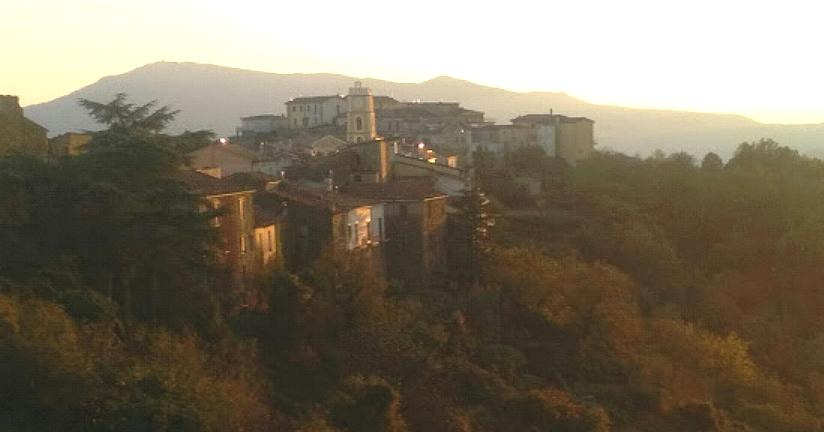

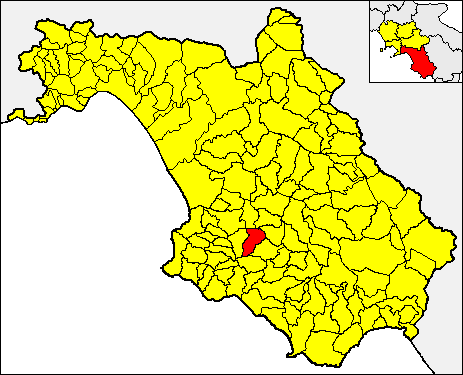
- Orria within the Province of Salerno

- Location within Italy Location within Campania
- Coordinates: 40°17′58.1″N 15°10′14.0″E
- Country: Italy
- Region: Campania
- Province: Salerno (SA)
- Frazioni: Casino Lebano, Piano Vetrale

Area
  - Total: 26.55 km^{2} (10.25 sq mi)
- Elevation: 540 m (1,770 ft)

Population (2011)
  - Total: 1,161
  - Density: 43.73/km^{2} (113.3/sq mi)
- Demonym: Orriesi
- Time zone: UTC+1 (CET)
  - Summer (DST): UTC+2 (CEST)
- Postal code: 84060
- Dialing code: 0974
- ISTAT code: 065085
- Patron saint: St. Felix
- Saint day: 2nd Sunday of August
- Website: Official website

Orria is a town and comune in the province of Salerno in the Campania region of south-western Italy. As of 2011, its population was 1161.

== History ==
The origins of the town, around the 6th century, are uncertain, and possibly related to the destruction of the Ancient Greek city of Velia. Orria became an autonomous municipality in 1806, including also the town of Perito.

== Geography ==
Located in the middle of Cilento, and part of its national park, Orria is a hilltown whose municipality borders Gioi, Magliano Vetere, Monteforte Cilento, Perito, Salento and Stio. Its hamlets (frazioni) are the villages of Casino Lebano (pop.: 69) and Piano Vetrale (pop.: 475).

== Main sights ==
- The palaces of the old town
- The rural culture museum
- The murales in the village of Piano Vetrale

== Personalities ==
- Paolo de Matteis (1662–1728), painter, born in Piano Vetrale

== See also ==
- Cilentan dialect
