= Felitto =

- Comune
- Comune di Felitto
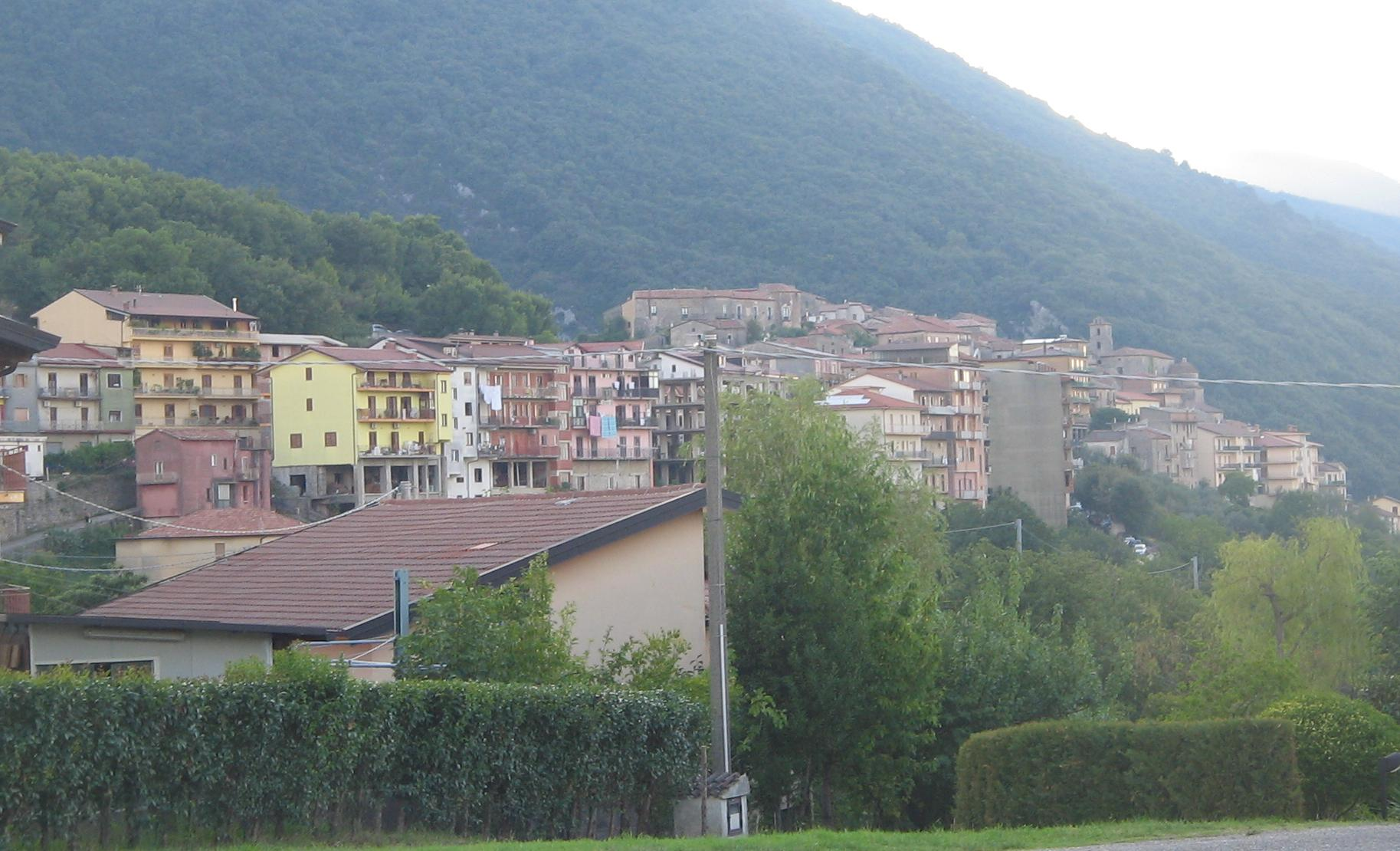
- Panoramic view from south

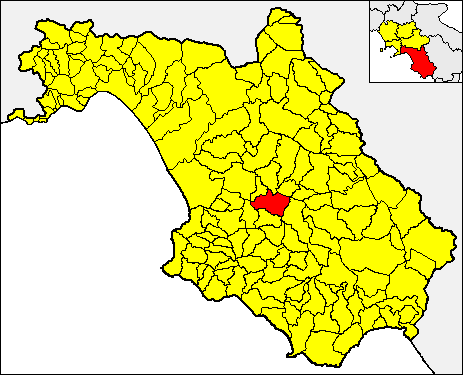
- Felitto within the Province of Salerno

- Location within Italy Location within Campania
- Coordinates: 40°22′24.2″N 15°14′37.6″E
- Country: Italy
- Region: Campania
- Province: Salerno (SA)

Government
  - Mayor: Carmine Casella

Area
  - Total: 41.53 km^{2} (16.03 sq mi)

Population (28 February 2017)
  - Total: 1,235
  - Density: 29.74/km^{2} (77.02/sq mi)
- Demonym: Felittesi
- Time zone: UTC+1 (CET)
  - Summer (DST): UTC+2 (CEST)
- Postal code: 84055
- Dialing code: 0828
- Patron saint: St. Vitus
- Saint day: 15 June
- Website: Official website

Felitto is a town and comune in the province of Salerno in the Campania region of south-west Italy. It is famous for fusilli, a kind of handmade pasta, and the annual Fusillo festival.

== History ==
The town was founded at the beginning of the 10th century. Much of the medieval old town has been preserved.

== Geography ==
Located on a valley above Calore river below the mount Chianiello (1,314 amsl), in the middle of Cilento, the municipality borders with Castel San Lorenzo, Laurino, Magliano Vetere, Monteforte Cilento and Roccadaspide.

It counts no proper hamlets (frazioni) but several minor localities, that are Acqua delle Donne, Acquanoceta, Alvani, Barbagiano, Bosco Grande, Carpineto, Carrozzo, Casale, Cerzito, Chianelisi, Difesa Lombi, Difesa Principe, Fossa del Lupo, Lago, Maruzza, Mazzarella, Montagnano, Palumbo, Pazzano, Piano d'Elise, Pietracute, Remolino, San Giorgio, San Vito, Santoianni, Serre, Starza, Territorio, Torre and Vignali.

== Main sights ==
- Medieval old town and old bridge
- Canyon and waterfall of Gole del Calore

== Sister city ==
- (United States) Old Forge, Lackawanna County, Pennsylvania

== People ==
- Matteo de Augustinis (1799-1845), lawyer and economist

== See also ==
- Cilentan dialect
- Cilento and Vallo di Diano National Park
