= Magliano Vetere =

- Comune
- Comune di Magliano Vetere
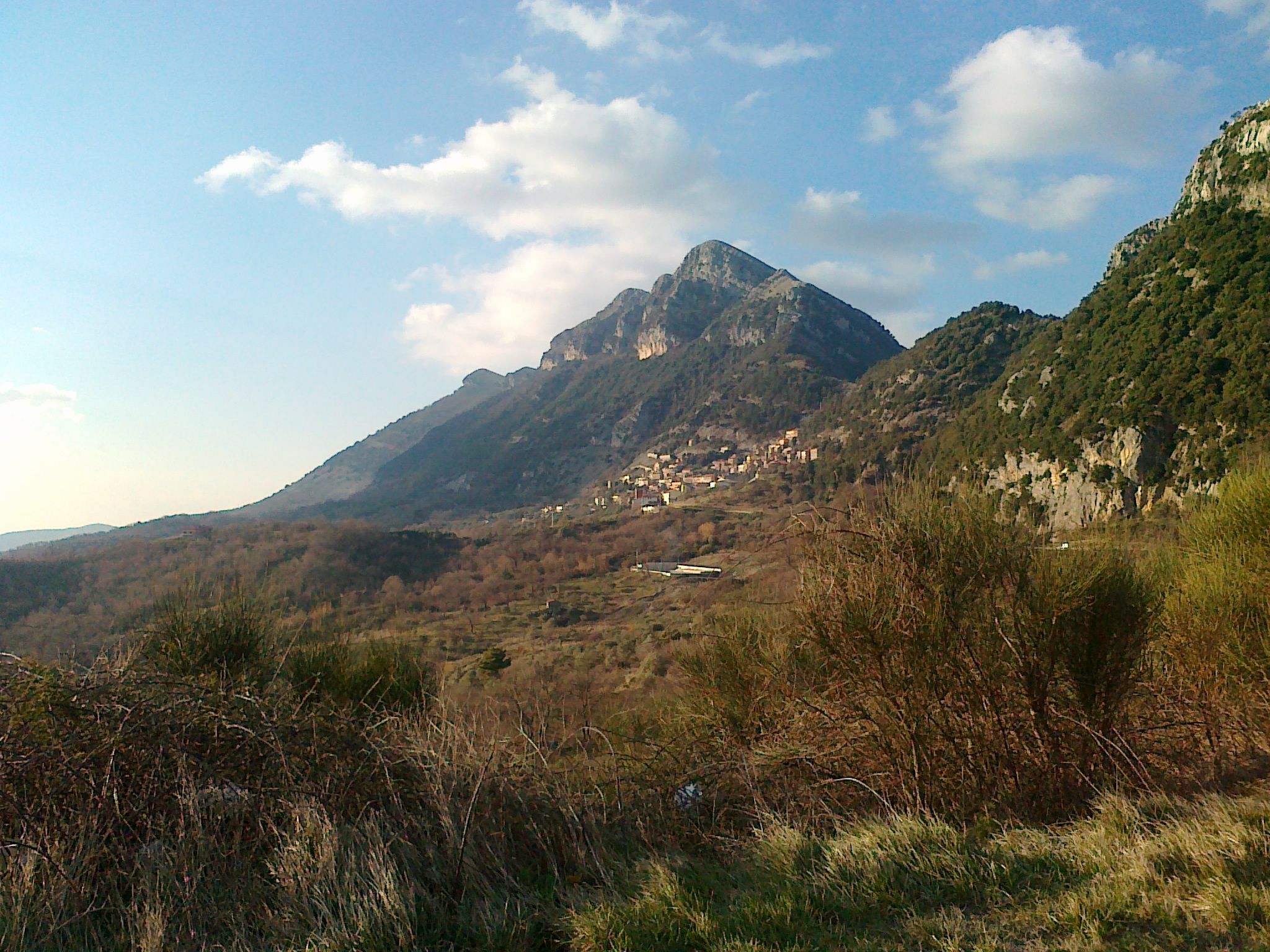

- Coat of arms

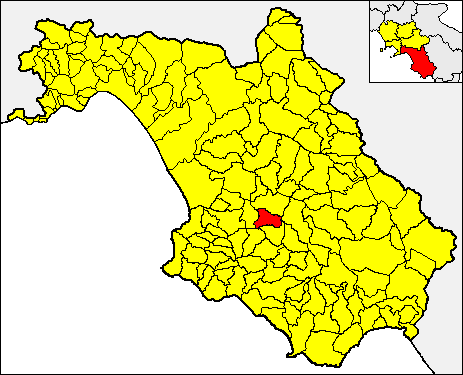
- Magliano Vetere within the Province of Salerno

- Location within Italy Location within Campania
- Coordinates: 40°20′51.2″N 15°14′10.7″E
- Country: Italy
- Region: Campania
- Province: Salerno (SA)
- Frazioni: Capizzo, Magliano Nuovo

Government
  - Mayor: Carmine D'Alessandro

Area
  - Total: 22 km^{2} (8.5 sq mi)
- Elevation: 650 m (2,130 ft)

Population (28 February 2017)
  - Total: 691
  - Density: 31/km^{2} (81/sq mi)
- Demonym: Maglianesi
- Time zone: UTC+1 (CET)
  - Summer (DST): UTC+2 (CEST)
- Postal code: 84050
- Dialing code: 0974
- Patron saint: St. Lucy
- Saint day: 3rd Sunday of September
- Website: Official website

Magliano Vetere is a town and comune in the province of Salerno in the Campania region of south-western Italy. As of 2011 its population was 739.

== History ==
The town, anciently named Malleanum or Mallianum, was first mentioned in a document of the 9th century. It was a Norman state (internal subdivision of a baronial circumdary) that included Capizzo, Stio and Gorga.

Heavily damaged in a fire in 1669, Magliano was rebuilt over a nearby hill, site of an ancient Goth castle, with the name of Magliano Nuovo ("New Magliano"). Some years later, the original site was rebuilt with the name of Magliano Vetere ("Old Magliano").

== Geography ==
Magliano Vetere is located in a mountain area in the middle of the Cilento, above the Alento river valley and close to the gorges of Calore Lucano. It borders with the municipalities of Felitto, Laurino, Monteforte Cilento, Orria and Stio. The municipality has two hamlets (frazioni), Capizzo and Magliano Nuovo.

== See also ==
- Cilentan dialect
- Cilento and Vallo di Diano National Park
