= Perito =

- Comune
- Comune di Perito
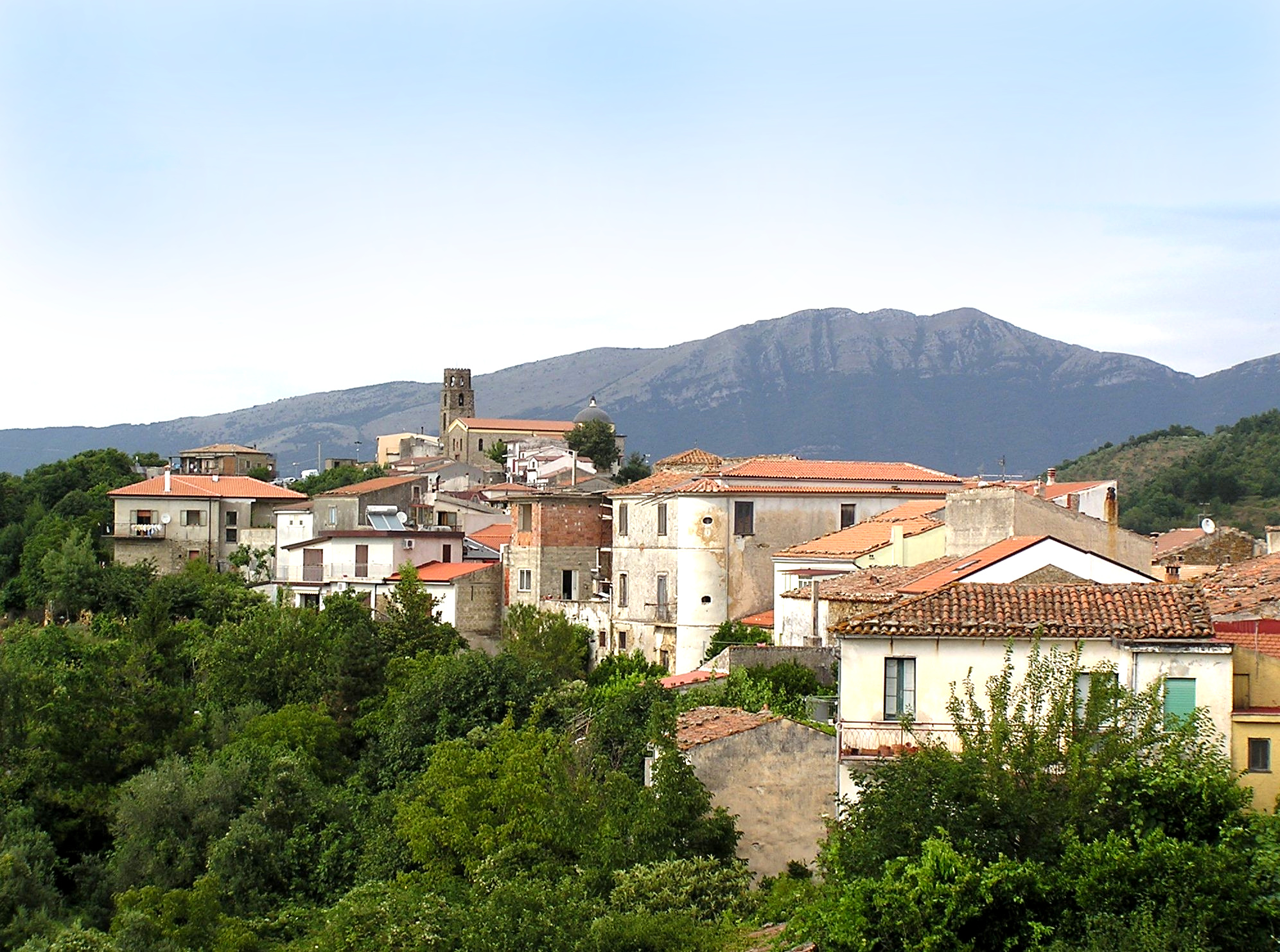

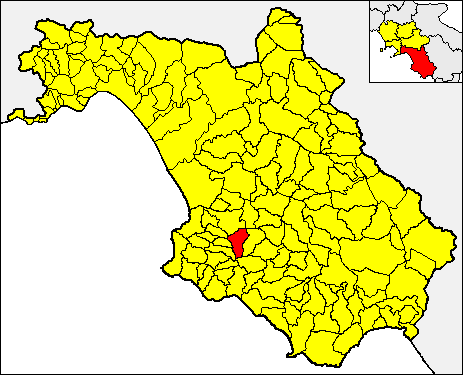
- Perito within the Province of Salerno

- Location within Italy Location within Campania
- Coordinates: 40°18′02.2″N 15°08′54.3″E
- Country: Italy
- Region: Campania
- Province: Salerno (SA)
- Frazioni: Ostigliano

Area
  - Total: 23 km^{2} (8.9 sq mi)

Population (2011)
  - Total: 1,007
  - Density: 44/km^{2} (110/sq mi)
- Demonym: Peritesi
- Time zone: UTC+1 (CET)
  - Summer (DST): UTC+2 (CEST)
- Postal code: 84060
- Dialing code: 0974
- ISTAT code: 065092
- Website: Official website

Perito (Cilentan: Prito) is a town and comune in the province of Salerno in the Campania region of south-western Italy. As of 2011 its population was 1,007.

== History ==
In the Middle Ages Perito had an important role as a fortified town in control of the valleys below. From 1801 to 1860 it was a hamlet of Orria, and then it became an independent municipality.

== Geography ==
Perito is a hill town located in Cilento, included in its national park. The municipal territory, partly crossed by Alento river, borders with Cicerale, Lustra, Monteforte Cilento, Orria, Prignano Cilento, Rutino and Salento. It counts a single hamlet (frazione): Ostigliano (pop.: 431).

== Gallery ==
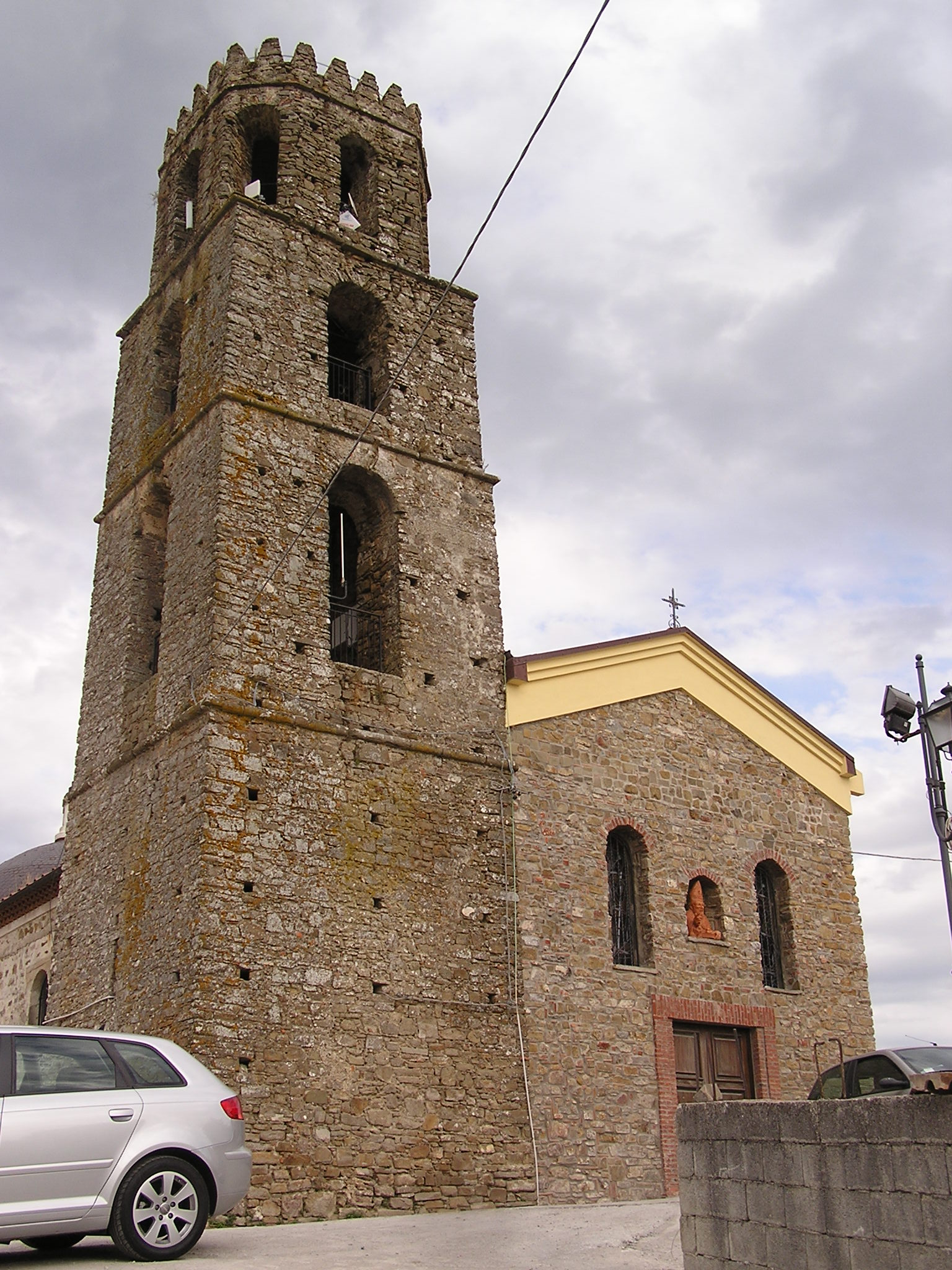
The medieval St. Nicholas' church

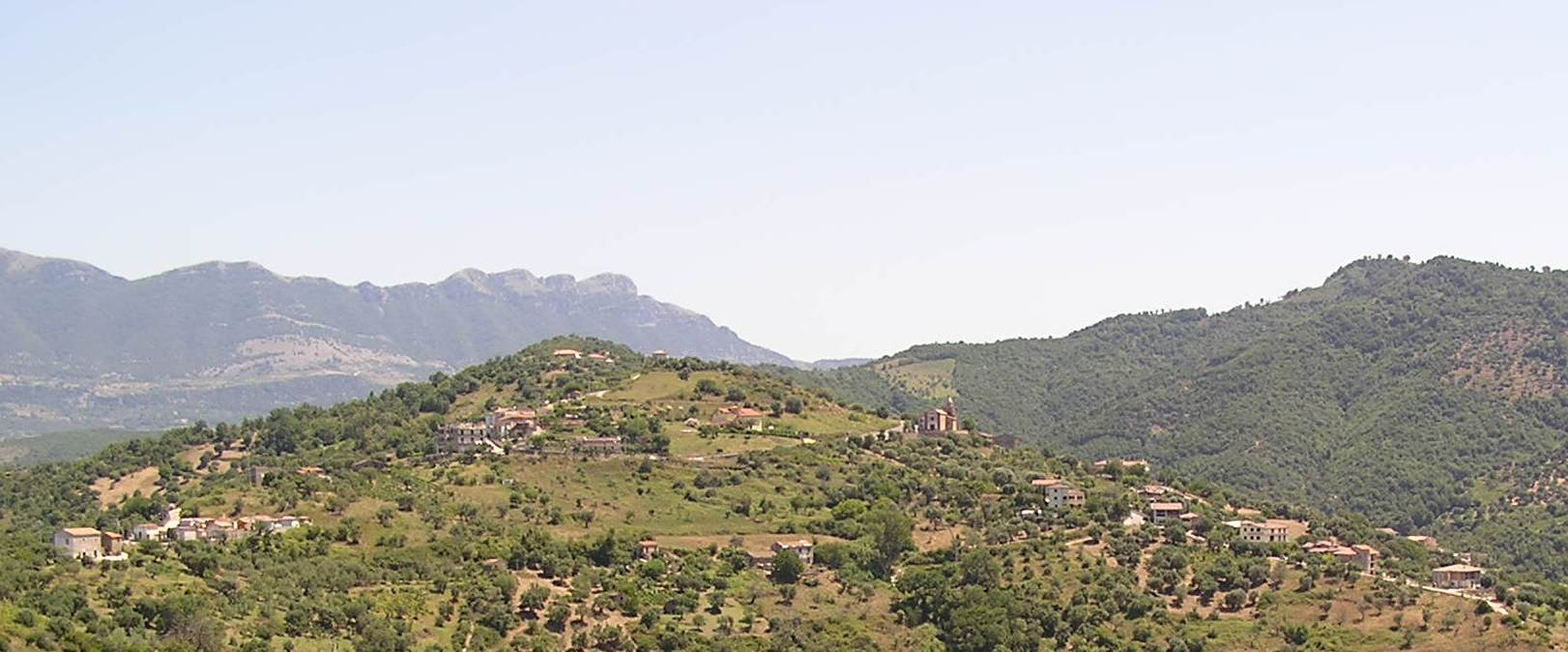
View of the hamlet of Ostigliano

== See also ==
- Cilentan dialect
