= Stio =

- Comune
- Comune di Stio
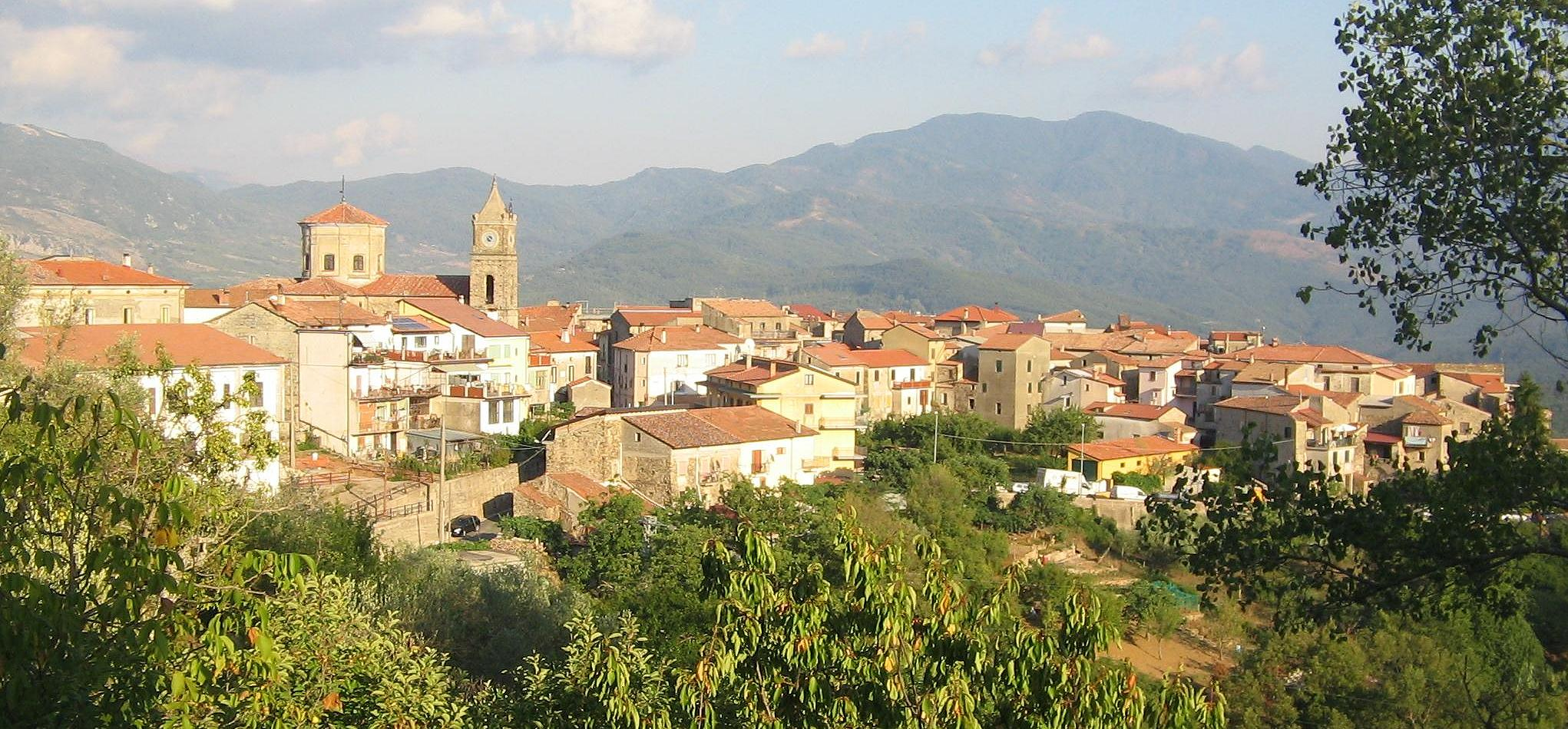

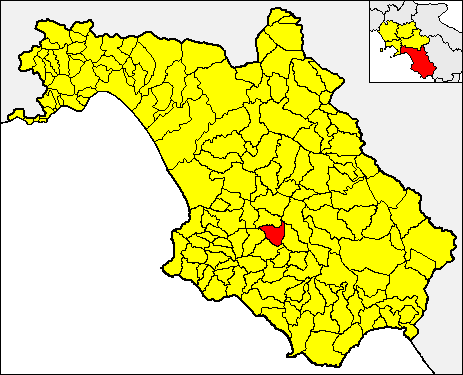
- Stio within the Province of Salerno

- Location within Italy Location within Campania
- Coordinates: 40°18′35.32″N 15°15′7.21″E
- Country: Italy
- Region: Campania
- Province: Salerno (SA)
- Frazioni: Gorga

Government
  - Mayor: Giancarlo Trotta

Area
  - Total: 24 km^{2} (9.3 sq mi)
- Elevation: 675 m (2,215 ft)

Population (2016)
  - Total: 872
  - Density: 36/km^{2} (94/sq mi)
- Demonym: Stiesi
- Time zone: UTC+1 (CET)
  - Summer (DST): UTC+2 (CEST)
- Postal code: 84075
- Dialing code: 0974
- ISTAT code: 065145
- Patron saint: St. Paschal Baylon
- Saint day: 17 May
- Website: Official website

Stio is a town and comune in the province of Salerno in the Campania region of south-western Italy. As of 2016, its population was 872.

== History ==
The village was founded in the beginnings of the 11th century. The origin of the name is debated, and it has been supposed it could derive from the Latin word Ostium ("entrance"), or others.

== Geography ==
Located in the middle of Cilento, and part of its national park, Stio is a hilltown near the springs of Alento river and the forest area of Pruno. The municipality borders with Campora, Gioi, Laurino, Magliano Vetere and Orria. It counts a single hamlet (frazione), that is the village of Gorga, 3 km far from it and with a population of 160.

The town is composed by the medieval old town and spans, along the national highway SR 488, with two more recent areas: Via Amendola in the west, and Via Mazzini in the east. The upper area, named Piano del Rosario and composed by some scattered houses surrounded by a forest, is located above the village of Gorga.

== Main sights ==
- St. Paschal Church (18th century), located in the middle of the town
- The ancient St. Peter and Paul Church (11th century), located south of the old town.
- The Mill Valley (Italian: Valle dei Mulini), located outside the town.

== Personalities ==
- Raffaele Lettieri (1881–1957), politician and academic, born in Gorga
- Antonino Maria Stromillo (1786–1858), Catholic bishop, first one of the Diocese of Caltanissetta, born in Gorga

== Gallery ==
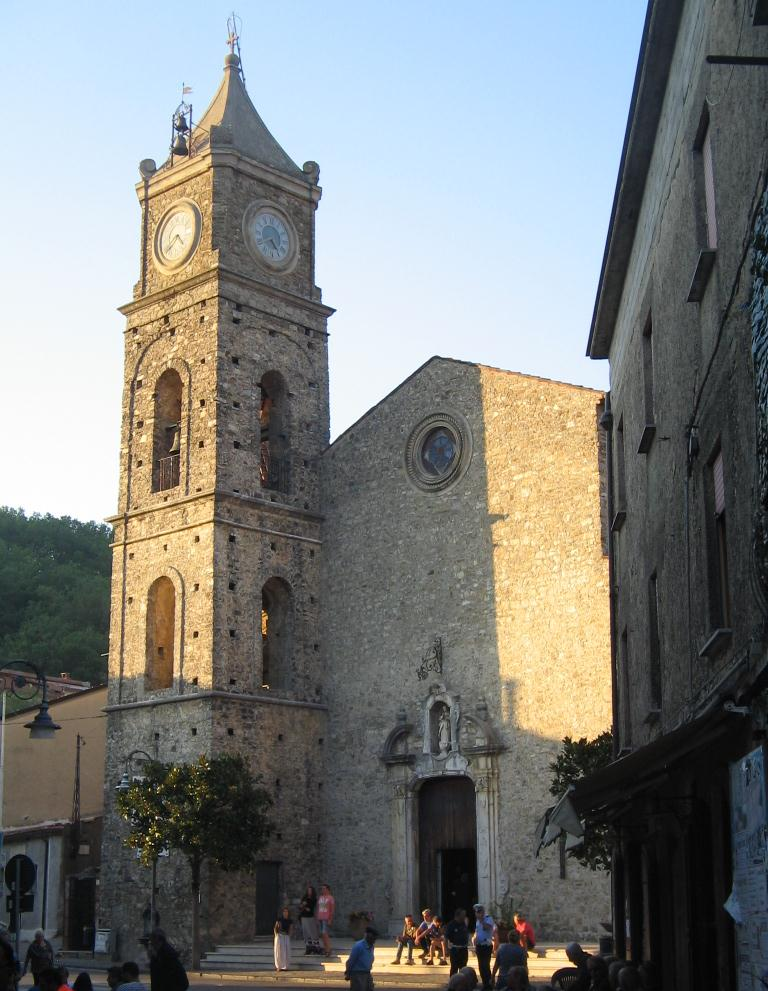
The central St. Paschal Church

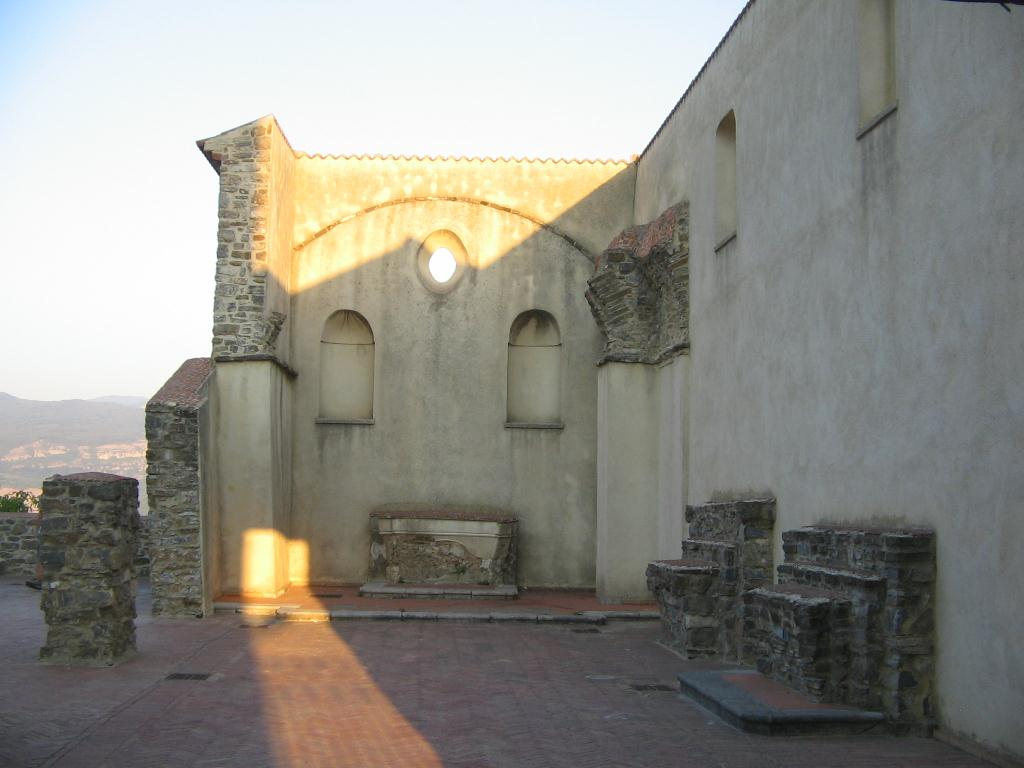
Rests of the ancient St. Peter and Paul Church

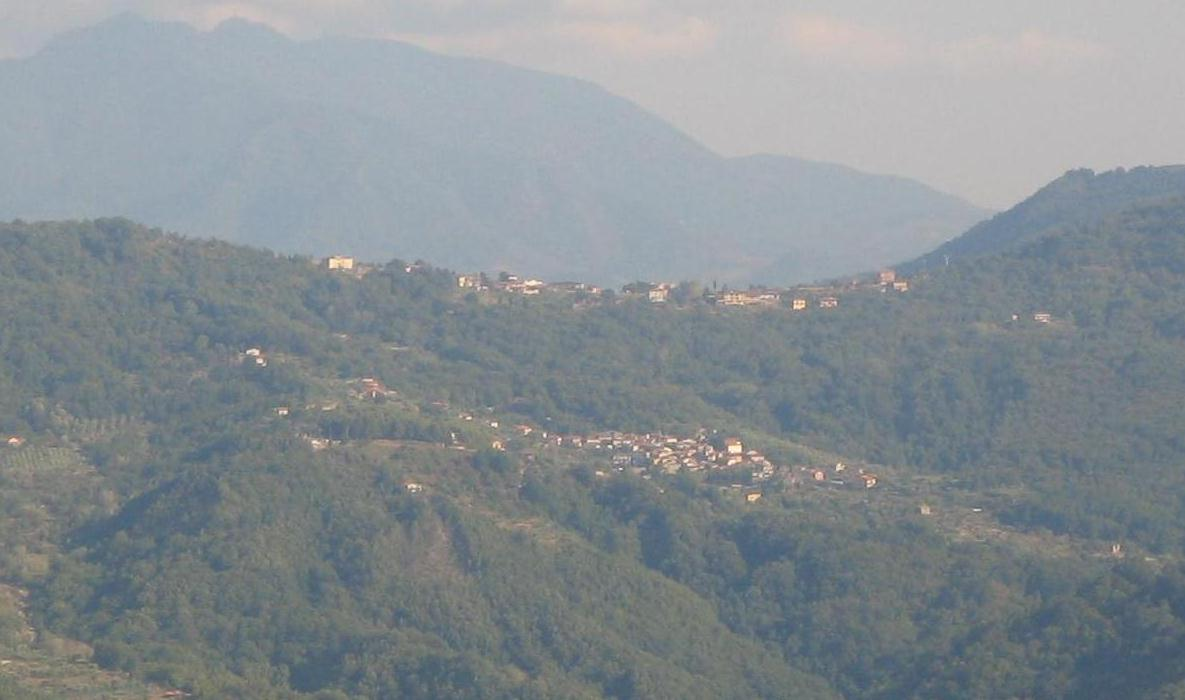
View of the frazione Gorga with (above) Piano del Rosario

== Twin towns ==
- Dingé (France)

== See also ==
- Cilentan dialect
