= Alento (Cilento) =

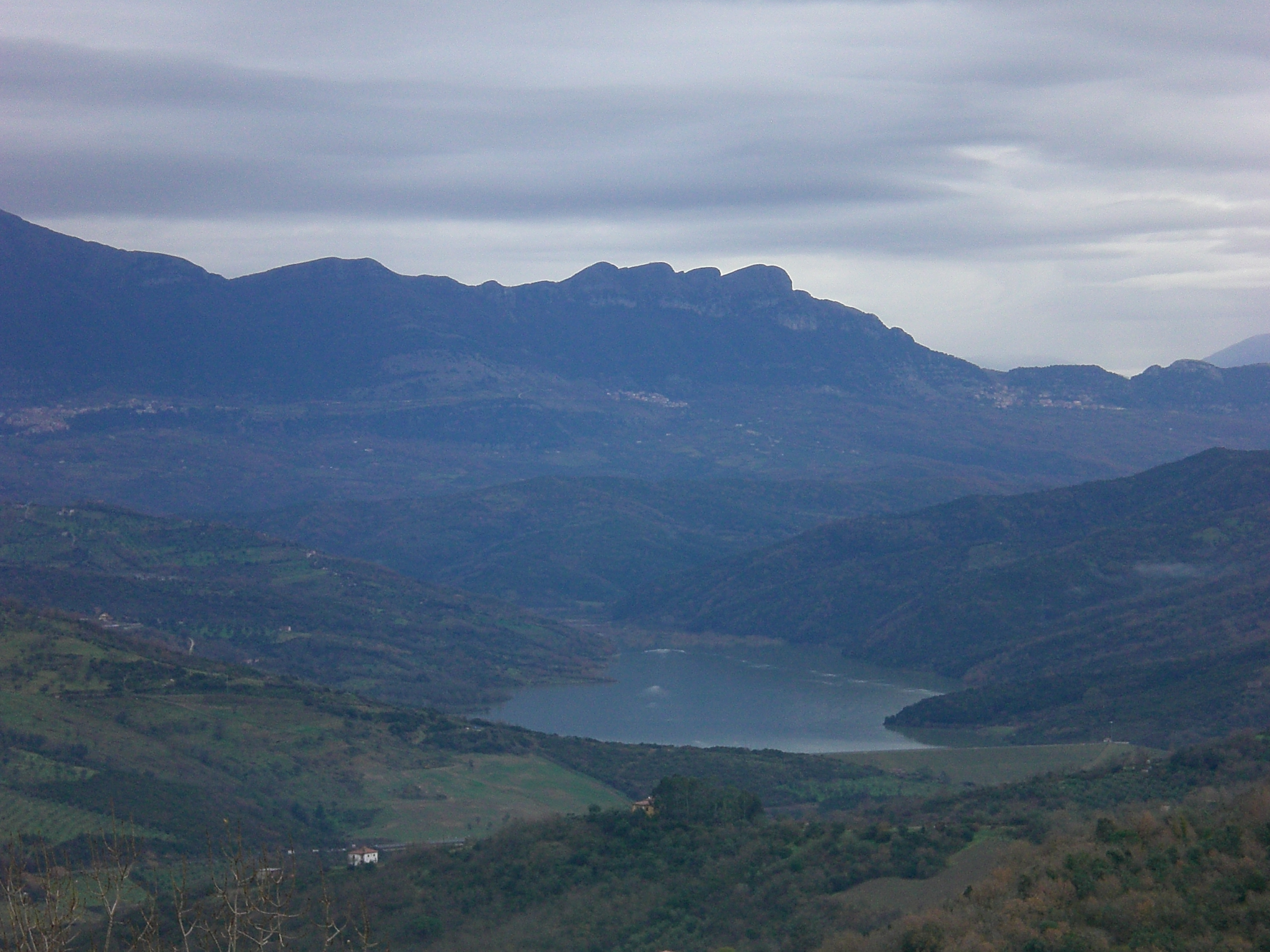
- Alento reservoir seen from Monteforte Cilento

Location
- Country: Italy

Physical characteristics
- Source
  - location: Le Corne mountain, Gorga
  - coordinates: 40°19′10″N 15°13′58″E
  - elevation: 894 m (2,933 ft)
- Mouth
  - location: Tyrrhenian Sea, between Marina di Casalvelino and Velia
  - coordinates: 40°9′49″N 15°8′36″E
- Length: 36 km (22 mi)
- Basin size: 415 km^{2} (160 sq mi)
- Discharge
  - average: 4.67 m^{3}/s (165 cu ft/s)

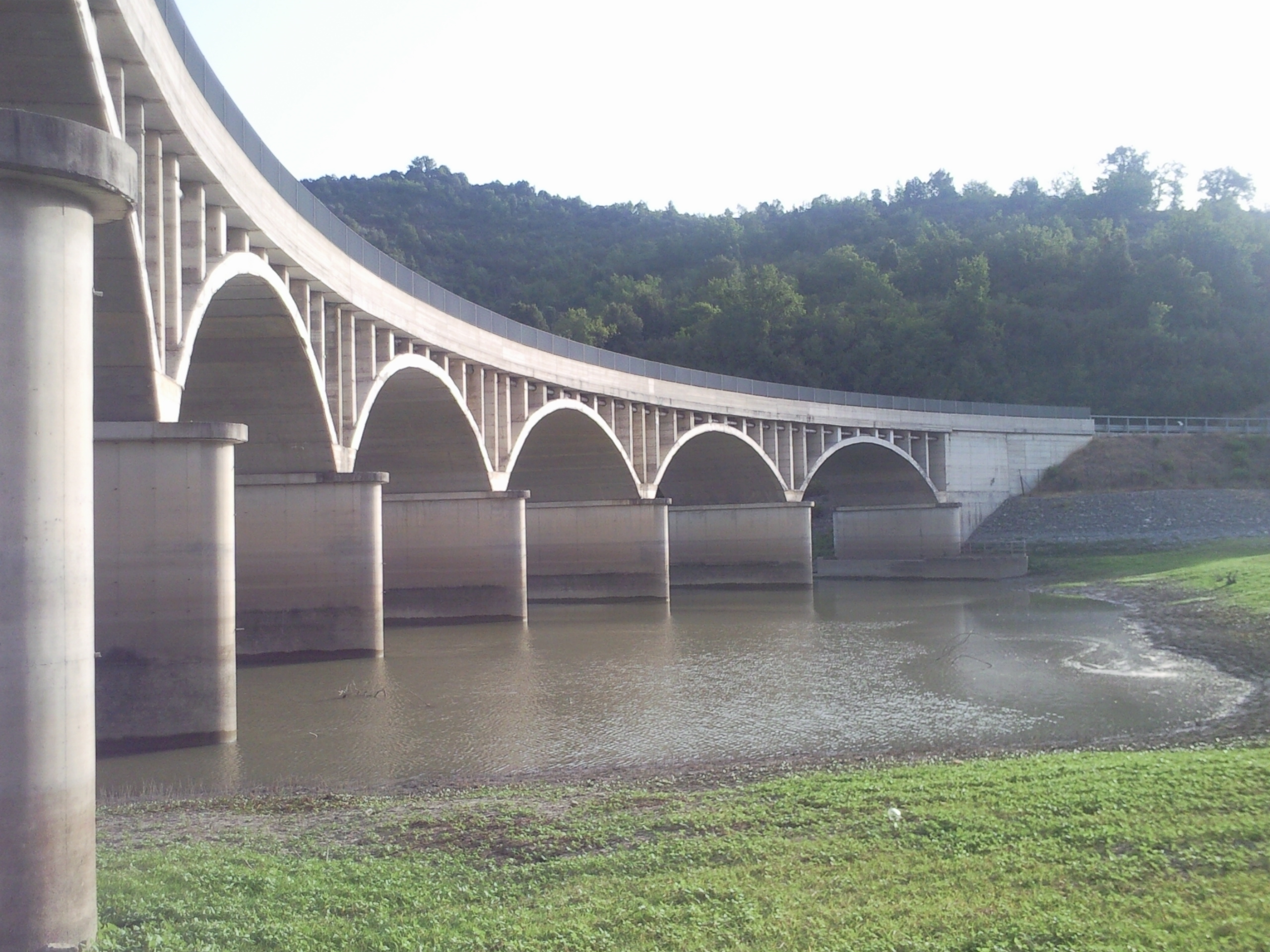
A bridge over the Alento reservoir, on the municipal border between Prignano Cilento (left) and Cicerale (right)

The Alento is a river in southwestern Italy. Originating from "Le Corne" mountain, nearby the village of Gorga, it flows in the Campanian territory of Cilento, in the Province of Salerno. Its mouth is on the Tyrrhenian Sea, close to the Ancient Greek town of Velia, at the borders between the municipalities of Casal Velino and Ascea.

== History ==
Originally named Alentum, the Latin word Cis Alentum (i.e.: "On this side of the Alento") is the origin of the toponym "Cilento". The river was mentioned by Strabo, into the Geographica, and by Cicero, who defined it noble.

== Geography ==
After its origin in Gorga (a frazione of Stio), the river flows in a large valley crossing the municipal territories of Magliano Vetere and Monteforte Cilento. After it, between the territories of Cicerale, Prignano Cilento and Perito (at Ostigliano) the river forms a reservoir serving a dam. After the dam and a nature park it crosses the municipalities of Rutino, Lustra, Omignano (at Omignano Scalo), Salento, Castelnuovo Cilento (through the villages of Vallo Scalo and Velina), Casal Velino and Ascea. The mouth is located between Marina di Casalvelino and Velia.

The Alento has 3 tributaries: Palistro river and Badolato creek originate from the Mount Gelbison, Fiumicello creek originates from the Mount Stella.

== Natural environment ==
The river, partly included in the territory of the Cilento National Park, counts a nature park named Oasi Fiume Alento ("Alento River Oasis") nearby the dam. Due to the integrity of its natural environment, the river is home to some rare species of animals, as the European otter (Lutra lutra, rare in Italy) and the Italian bleak (Alburnus albidus).
