= Strada statale 18 Tirrena Inferiore =

State highway in Italy

State Highway 18
- Strada statale 18
- Tirrena Inferiore

Route information
- Maintained by ANAS
- Length: 406.15 km (252.37 mi)
- Existed: 1928–present

Major junctions
- From: A2 at Fratte junction
- To: Reggio di Calabria

Location
- Country: Italy
- Regions: Campania, Basilicata, Calabria

Highway system
- Roads in Italy; Autostrade; State; Regional; Provincial; Municipal
← SS 17var-A	→ SS 18var

The strada statale 18 "Tirrena Inferiore" (SS 18) an Italian state highway 406.15 kilometres (252.37 mi) long in Italy located in the regions of Campania, Basilicata and Calabria. It is among the longest and most important state highways in southern Italy, considering that it follows the Tyrrhenian coast, from Salerno to Reggio di Calabria.

== History ==
The road was created in 1928 with the following route: "Naples - Torre Annunziata - Salerno - Battipaglia - Rutino - Vallo - Torre Orsaia - Sapri - Paola - Sant'Eufemia Lamezia - Nicastro - Monteleone - Reggio Calabria." The road was called "Tirrena Inferiore", from the name of the Tyrrhenian Sea. In 1953 the route was modified.

== Route ==
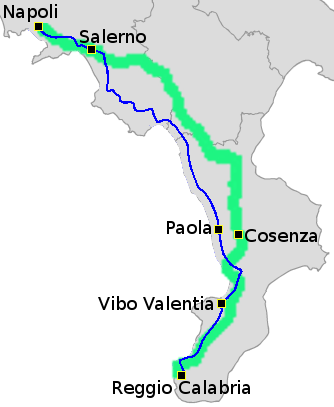
Comparison of the routes of the SS 18 (marked in blue) with the Autostrada A3 (up to Salerno) and with the Autostrada A2 (up to Reggio Calabria) in marked green

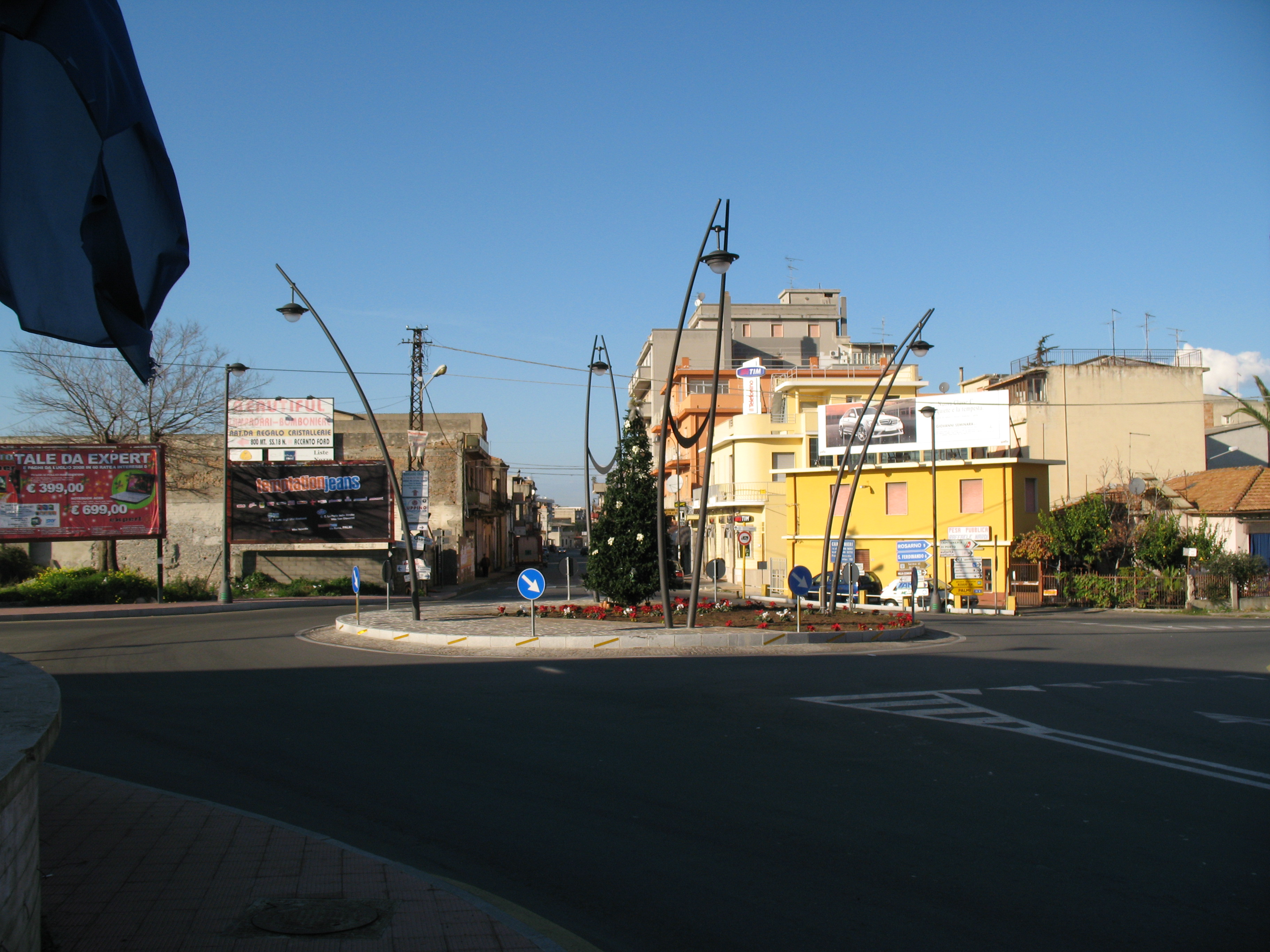
Strada statale 18 Tirrena Inferiore in Gioia Tauro

=== Old route from Naples (now SR ex SS18) ===
Campania

- Metropolitan City of Naples:

Naples, San Giorgio a Cremano, Portici, Ercolano, Torre del Greco, Torre Annunziata, Pompei.

- Province of Salerno:

Scafati, Angri, Sant'Egidio del Monte Albino, Pagani, Nocera Inferiore, Nocera Superiore, Cava de' Tirreni, Vietri sul Mare, Salerno.

Tirrena Inferiore; Tangenziale di Salerno
Exit	↓km↓	Province
diramazione Napoli	54.8 km (34.1 mi)	SA
Fratte dei Due Principati	55.3 km (34.4 mi)	SA
Salerno Centro via Irno; Rione Petrosino	55.8 km (34.7 mi)	SA
Sala Abbagnano - Torrione	57.3 km (35.6 mi)	SA
Pastena; Giovi - S. Eustachio - S. Margherita - Mercatello	58.9 km (36.6 mi)	SA
Mariconda; Mercatello - Arbostella - Salerno est	60.7 km (37.7 mi)	SA
Rest area "San Leonardo"	61.6 km (38.3 mi)	SA
San Giovanni di Dio e Ruggi d'Aragona - Scuola Medica Salernitana Hospital; San Leonardo ex- Tirrena Inferiore	62.2 km (38.6 mi)	SA
Industrial area Fuorni; Stadio Arechi; Litoranea	63.5 km (39.5 mi)	SA
Aversana; Salerno Costa d'Amalfi Airport; Paestum	64.3 km (40.0 mi)	SA
Pontecagnano; Tirrena Inferiore	66.1 km (41.1 mi)	SA
del Mediterraneo	66.6 km (41.4 mi)	SA

=== Current route ===
Campania

- Province of Salerno:

Salerno, Pontecagnano, Bivio Pratole (Montecorvino Pugliano-Bellizzi), Bellizzi, Battipaglia, Corno d'Oro (Eboli), Cioffi (Eboli), Santa Cecilia (Eboli), Ponte Barizzo (Capaccio), Paestum (Capaccio), Mattine (Agropoli), Ogliastro Cilento, Prignano Cilento, Sant'Antuono (Torchiara), Rutino, Omignano Scalo (Omignano), Vallo Scalo (Casal Velino), Pantana (Castelnuovo Cilento), Vallo della Lucania, Novi Velia, San Biase (Ceraso), Massascusa (Ceraso), Cuccaro Vetere, Futani, Montano Antilia, Laurito, Alfano, Castel Ruggero (Torre Orsaia), Torre Orsaia, Policastro Bussentino (Santa Marina), Capitello (Ispani), Villammare (Vibonati), Sapri.

Basilicata

- Province of Potenza:

Acquafredda, Cersuta, Marina di Maratea, Castrocucco (all frazioni of Maratea).

Calabria

- Province of Cosenza:

Tortora Marina (Tortora), Praia a Mare, San Nicola Arcella, Scalea, Santa Maria del Cedro, Grisolia, Cirella, Diamante, Belvedere Marittimo, Sangineto, Bonifati, Cetraro, Acquappesa, Marina di Guardia Piemontese (Guardia Piemontese), Marina di Fuscaldo (Fuscaldo), Paola, San Lucido, Falconara Albanese, Fiumefreddo Bruzio, Longobardi, Belmonte Calabro, Amantea, Campora San Giovanni.

- Province of Catanzaro:

Nocera Terinese, Falerna Marina (Falerna), Gizzeria Lido (Gizzeria), Lamezia Terme, Curinga.

- Province of Vibo Valentia:

Pizzo Calabro, Vibo Valentia, Mileto.

- Metropolitan City of Reggio Calabria:

Rosarno, Gioia Tauro, Palmi, Seminara, Bagnara Calabra, Scilla, Villa San Giovanni, Reggio Calabria.

== See also ==
- State highways (Italy)
- Roads in Italy
- Transport in Italy

=== Other Italian roads ===
- Autostrade of Italy
- Regional road (Italy)
- Provincial road (Italy)
- Municipal road (Italy)
