= Cilento Coast =

Stretch of coastline in Italy

Coordinates: 40.125°N 15.182°E

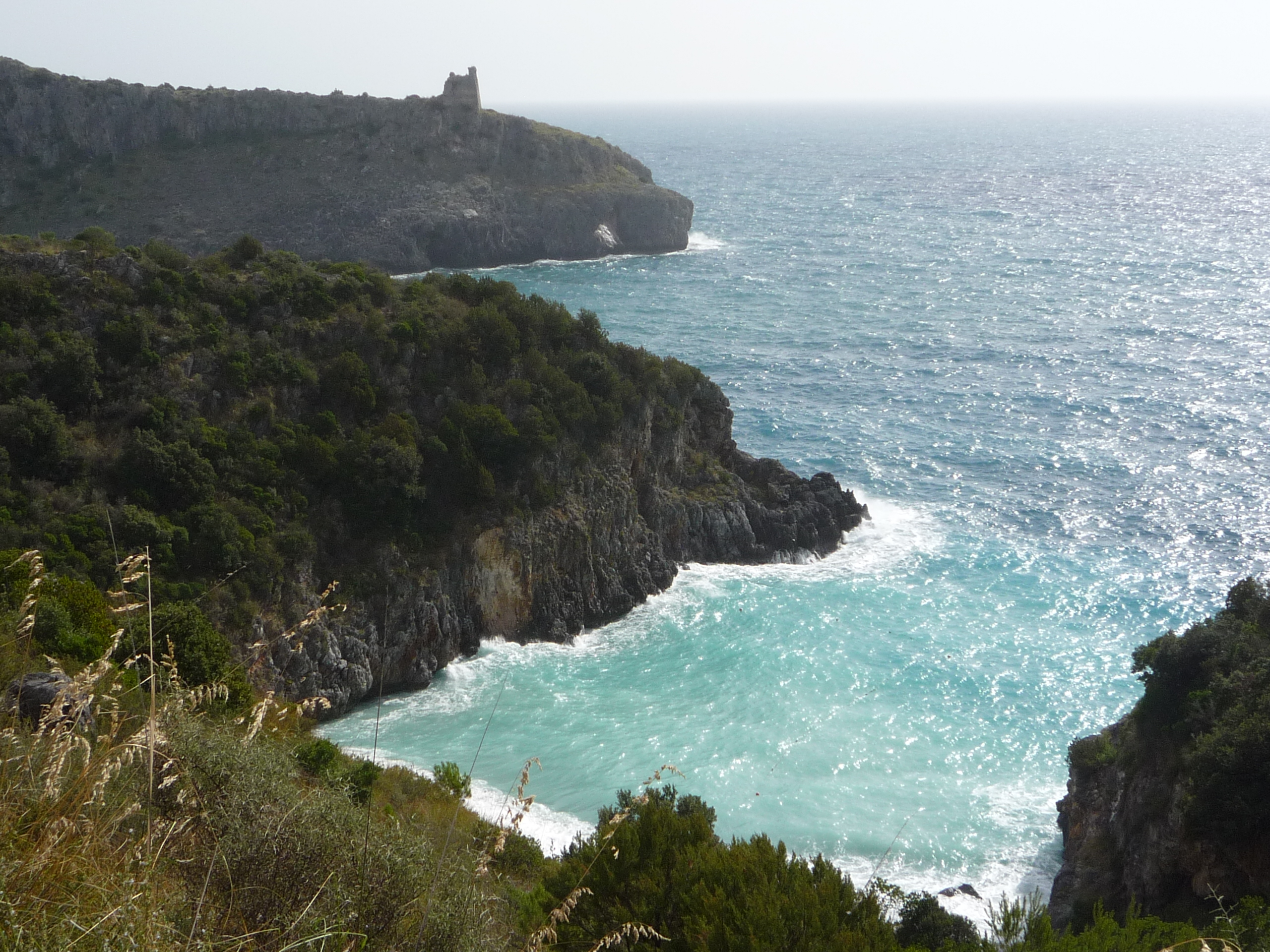
The coast nearby Marina di Camerota

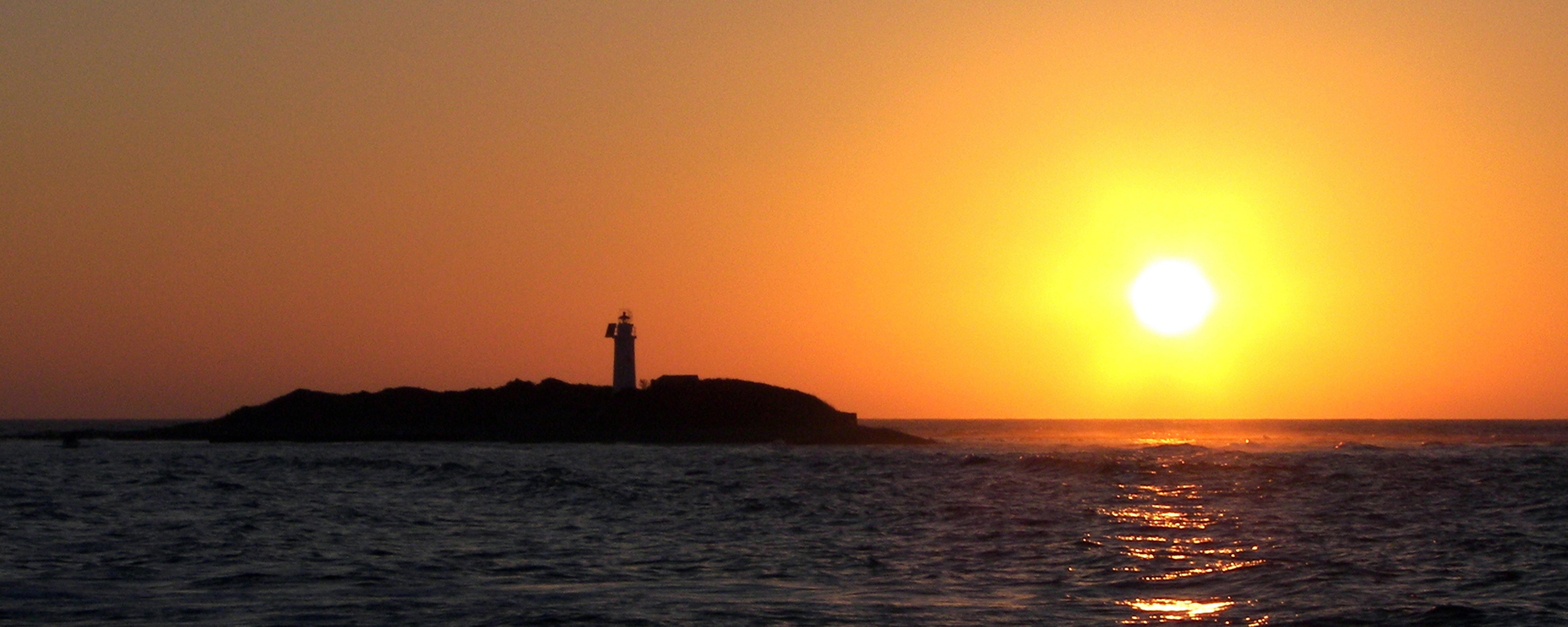
Sunset at Licosa

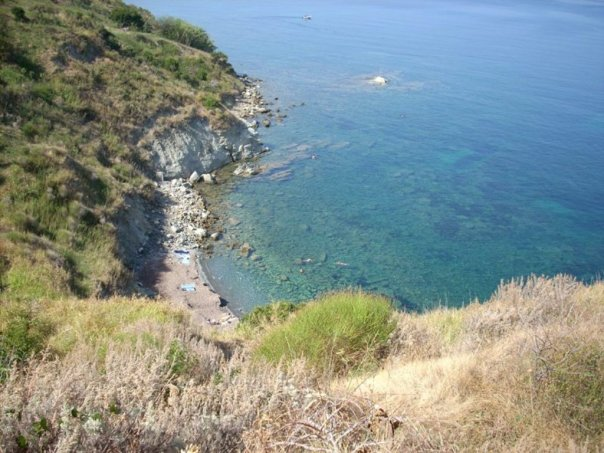
The little beach of San Francesco, south of Agropoli

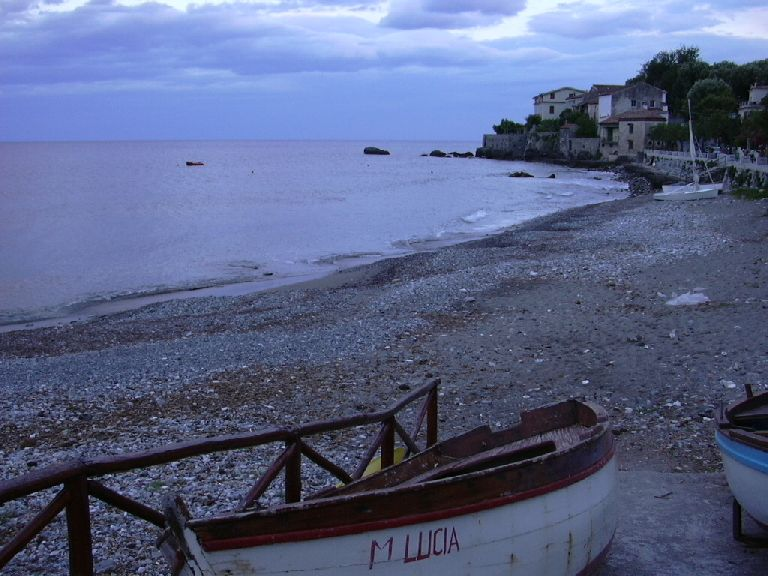
The central beach of Scario

The Cilento Coast (Italian: Costiera Cilentana) is an Italian stretch of coastline in Cilento, on the southern side of the Province of Salerno. It is situated between the gulfs of Salerno and Policastro, extending from the municipalities of Capaccio-Paestum in the north-west, to Sapri in the south-east.

It is particularly known for its almost unspoiled natural landscapes and the very high cleanliness of its waters.

== Geography ==
Map showing municipalities of the Cilentan Coast

There are 16 municipalities composing the coast, but only two (Agropoli and Sapri) are directly located by the Tyrrhenian Sea, and other two (Ascea and Pisciotta) have got their Marinas very close to the towns. Other localities are frazioni of hillside municipalities.

- Agropoli, with the municipal seat and Mattine
- Ascea, with Velia and Marina di Ascea
- Camerota, with Marina di Camerota
- Capaccio, with Torre Kernot, Laura, Paestum and Licinella
- Casal Velino, with Marina di Casalvelino
- Castellabate, with Santa Maria, San Marco, Licosa and Ogliastro Marina
- Centola, with Palinuro
- Ispani, with Capitello
- Montecorice, with Agnone Cilento and Case del Conte
- Pisciotta, with Caprioli and Marina di Pisciotta
- Pollica, with Acciaroli and Pioppi
- San Giovanni a Piro, with Scario
- San Mauro Cilento, with Mezzatorre
- Santa Marina, with Policastro Bussentino
- Sapri, with the municipal seat
- Vibonati, with Villammare

The promontory of Cape Palinuro, nearly at the centre of the Cilento coast, is a worldwide touristic landmark.

== Blue Flag ==
Due to the quality of its water, the Cilento Coast is the most awarded coastal area of Campania and one of the most ones of Italian Tyrrhenian Coast, by the Blue Flag beach. Many localities of the coast are also awarded with the Sails, from 5 to 1, of Legambiente.

== See also ==
- Cape Palinuro
- Tresino
- Porto Infreschi
- Cilentan language
- Amalfi Coast
- Sorrentine Peninsula
- Vallo di Diano
- Cilento and Vallo di Diano National Park
