= Scidrus =

Ancient Greek city in Southern Italy

Scidrus, also known as Skidros (Ancient Greek: Σκίδρος), was an ancient Greek city of Magna Graecia on the coast of Lucania, on the Tyrrhenian Sea, between Pyxus (Buxentum) and Laüs.

== History ==
It is mentioned by Herodotus (vi. 21), from whom we learn that it was, as well as Laüs, a colony of Sybaris, and was one of the places to which the surviving inhabitants of that city retired, after its destruction by the Crotoniats. It does not appear from his expressions whether these towns were then first founded by the fugitives, or had been previously settled as regular colonies; but the latter supposition is much the more probable. Stephanus of Byzantium (s. v.), calls it merely a city of Italy. It is situated in between of Velia and Pixous (Policastro Bussentino), which nowadays is Sapri, on the Gulf of Policastro, where there are extensive remains of the ancient city, which are generally considered the site of Scidrus. They are said to consist of the remains of a theatre and other public buildings of the ancient walls, and constructions around the port. (Antonini, Lucania, part ii. c. 11; Romanelli, vol. i. p. 377.) This last is a remarkable landlocked basin, though of small extent; and it is singular that, even if the town had ceased to exist, no allusion should be found to the existence of this secure port, on a coast almost wholly destitute of natural harbours. But the high mountains which shut it in and debar it from all communication with the interior probably prevented it from ever attaining any importance. Sapri is at the present day a mere fishing village, about 10 km east of Policastro.

== See also ==
- List of ancient Greek cities
