= Wonder Woman (2017 film) =

Superhero film directed by Patty Jenkins

- Theatrical release poster
- Directed by: Patty Jenkins
- Screenplay by: Allan Heinberg (Note: Uncredited revisions to Heinberg's screenplay were made by Patty Jenkins and Geoff Johns.)
- Story by: Zack Snyder; Allan Heinberg; Jason Fuchs
- Based on: Characters from DC
- Produced by: Charles Roven; Deborah Snyder; Zack Snyder; Richard Suckle
- Starring: Gal Gadot; Chris Pine; Robin Wright; Danny Huston; David Thewlis; Connie Nielsen; Elena Anaya
- Cinematography: Matthew Jensen
- Edited by: Martin Walsh
- Music by: Rupert Gregson-Williams
- Production companies: Warner Bros. Pictures; DC Films; Atlas Entertainment; Cruel and Unusual Films; RatPac Entertainment; Tencent Pictures; Wanda Pictures
- Distributed by: Warner Bros. Pictures
- Release dates: May 26, 2017 (Pantages Theatre); May 30, 2017 (Hong Kong); June 2, 2017 (United States and China)
- Running time: 141 minutes
- Countries: United States; China; Hong Kong
- Language: English
- Budget: $149 million
- Box office: $824 million

Wonder Woman is a 2017 superhero film based on the DC Comics character Wonder Woman. Directed by Patty Jenkins from a screenplay by Allan Heinberg, and based on a story by Heinberg, Zack Snyder, and Jason Fuchs, it is the fourth film in the DC Extended Universe (DCEU). Gal Gadot stars as Diana Prince / Wonder Woman alongside Chris Pine, Robin Wright, Danny Huston, David Thewlis, Connie Nielsen, and Elena Anaya. The film follows Diana, an Amazon princess, as she leaves her home island of Themyscira after the American spy Steve Trevor informs her about World War I. Believing it to be orchestrated by Ares, the god of war, she sets out to stop the conflict.

Development of a live-action Wonder Woman film began in 1996, with Ivan Reitman initially set to produce and possibly direct. The project remained in development hell for many years, with writers and directors like Jon Cohen, Todd Alcott, and Joss Whedon attached at various points. Warner Bros. officially announced the film in 2010, and Patty Jenkins was hired as the director in 2015. The film drew inspiration from William Moulton Marston's 1940s Wonder Woman stories, George Pérez's 1980s comics, and the New 52 version of the character. Principal photography began on November 21, 2015, in the United Kingdom, France, and Italy, and concluded on May 9, 2016. Additional filming occurred in November 2016.

Wonder Woman premiered at the Pantages Theatre in Hollywood on May 26, 2017, and was released in the United States by Warner Bros. Pictures on June 2. The film received positive reviews, with praise for Jenkins' direction, performances, visuals, story, action sequences, and cultural significance, though some criticism was directed at the climax. It grossed over $824 million worldwide, making it the tenth highest-grossing film of 2017 and the highest-grossing film by a solo female director until it was surpassed by Barbie (2023). The American Film Institute included Wonder Woman in its top ten films of 2017, and the film won the Hugo Award for Best Dramatic Presentation in 2018. A sequel, Wonder Woman 1984, was released in December 2020, with Patty Jenkins returning as director and Gal Gadot, Chris Pine, Robin Wright, and Connie Nielsen reprising their roles. Plans for a third film were cancelled after DC Films was restructured into DC Studios in 2022.

== Plot ==
In present-day Paris, Diana Prince receives a photographic plate from Wayne Enterprises taken during World War I. It shows her and four men, and prompts her to recall her past. (Note: Wonder Woman is the first film in the DCEU chronology, taking place in 1918.)

Diana, the young daughter of Queen Hippolyta, is raised on the hidden island of Themyscira, home to the Amazons, women warriors created by the Olympian gods to protect humankind. Hippolyta tells Diana the story of how Ares became jealous of humans and orchestrated their destruction. When the other gods attempted to stop him, Ares killed all but Zeus, who used the last of his power to wound Ares and force his retreat. Before dying, Zeus left the Amazons a weapon, the "god-killer", to prepare them for Ares' return. Seeking to protect Diana, Hippolyta hides her daughter's true origin from her, but reluctantly agrees to let her sister, Antiope, train Diana as a warrior.

In 1918, an adult Diana rescues US pilot Steve Trevor when his plane crashes off the coast of Themyscira. The island is soon invaded by German soldiers, who had been pursuing Trevor. The Amazons suffer some casualties, but wipe out the German landing force, with Antiope sacrificing herself to save Diana.

Steve is interrogated with the Lasso of Hestia and reveals that a great war is consuming the outside world and that he is an Allied spy. He has stolen a notebook from the Germans' chief chemist, Dr. Isabel Maru, who is attempting to engineer a deadlier form of mustard gas under the orders of General Erich Ludendorff. Believing Ares to be responsible for the war, Diana equips herself with the "god-killer" sword, the lasso, and armor before leaving Themyscira with Steve.

In London, they deliver Maru's notebook to the Supreme War Council, where Sir Patrick Morgan is trying to negotiate an armistice with Germany. Diana translates Maru's notes, revealing that the Germans plan to release the deadly gas at the Western Front. Although forbidden by his commander to act, Steve, with secret funding from Morgan, recruits the Moroccan spy Sameer, the Scottish marksman Charlie, and the American Indian smuggler Chief Napi to help prevent the gas from being released. When the team reaches the front in Belgium, Diana goes alone through No Man's Land and destroys the enemy trench, liberating the nearby village of Veld with the aid of the Allied forces. The team briefly celebrates and takes a photograph in the village, where Diana and Steve fall in love.

Steve and Diana infiltrate a gala at the German High Command. Steve intends to locate the gas and destroy it, while Diana hopes to kill Ludendorff, believing he is Ares. Steve stops her to avoid jeopardizing his mission, and Ludendorff subsequently kills the inhabitants of Veld with the gas. Angry at Steve for intervening, Diana pursues Ludendorff to a base where the gas is being loaded onto a bomber aircraft bound for London. She fights and kills him, but is confused and disillusioned when his death does not stop the war. Sir Patrick then appears and reveals himself to be Ares. He tells Diana that although he has subtly given humans ideas and inspiration, it is ultimately their decision to resort to violence because they are inherently corrupt. When Diana attempts to kill Ares with the "god-killer" sword, he destroys it, then reveals to her that she is the "god-killer" because she is the daughter of Zeus.

While Diana and Ares battle, Steve's team destroys Maru's laboratory. Steve hijacks the bomber carrying the poison, flies it to a safe altitude, then detonates it, blowing up the plane and himself. Ares attempts to direct Diana's rage and grief at Steve's death by convincing her to kill Maru, but the memories of her experiences with Steve cause her to realize that humans have goodness within them. She spares Maru and redirects Ares's lightning into him, killing him. Later, the team celebrates the end of the war.

In the present day, Diana sends an email to Bruce Wayne, thanking him for the photographic plate featuring her and Steve. She continues to fight for the world as Wonder Woman.

== Cast ==
- Gal Gadot as Diana Prince / Wonder Woman: An immortal Amazon warrior of the island Themyscira. Lilly Aspell portrays Diana at age 8, while Emily Carey portrays her at age 12.
- Chris Pine as Steve Trevor: An American pilot and spy and the love interest of Diana.
- Connie Nielsen as Hippolyta: The Amazon queen of Themyscira and Diana's mother.
- Robin Wright as Antiope: The sister of Hippolyta, the general of the Amazonian army, and Diana's aunt and mentor.
- David Thewlis as Sir Patrick: A speaker for peace of the Imperial War Cabinet who is revealed to be Ares, the god of war. (Note: Attributed to multiple references:)
- Danny Huston as Erich Ludendorff: A general of the Imperial German Army.
- Elena Anaya as Dr. Maru: A German chemist who specializes in poisons.
- Lucy Davis as Etta Candy: Steve Trevor's secretary who befriends Diana. (Note: Attributed to multiple references:)
- Saïd Taghmaoui as Sameer: A Moroccan spy and ally of Steve Trevor.
- Ewen Bremner as Charlie: A Scottish sharpshooter and ally of Steve Trevor.
- Eugene Brave Rock as Chief Napi: A Blackfoot smuggler who trades with both sides of the war. (Note: Attributed to multiple references:)
- Lisa Loven Kongsli as Menalippe: Antiope's lieutenant.

Additional Amazons are played by Ann Ogbomo (Philippus), Josette Simon (Mnemosyne), Mayling Ng (Orana), Florence Kasumba (Acantha), Madeleine Vall Beijner (Egeria), Hayley Jane Warnes (Aella), Ann Wolfe (Artemis), Eleanor Matsuura (Epione), Doutzen Kroes (Venelia), and Samantha Jo (Euboea). (Note: Attributed to multiple references:) James Cosmo appears as Sir Douglas Haig and Steffan Rhodri portrays Colonel Darnell. Zack Snyder makes a brief cameo appearance as an unnamed soldier.

== Production ==
=== Background ===
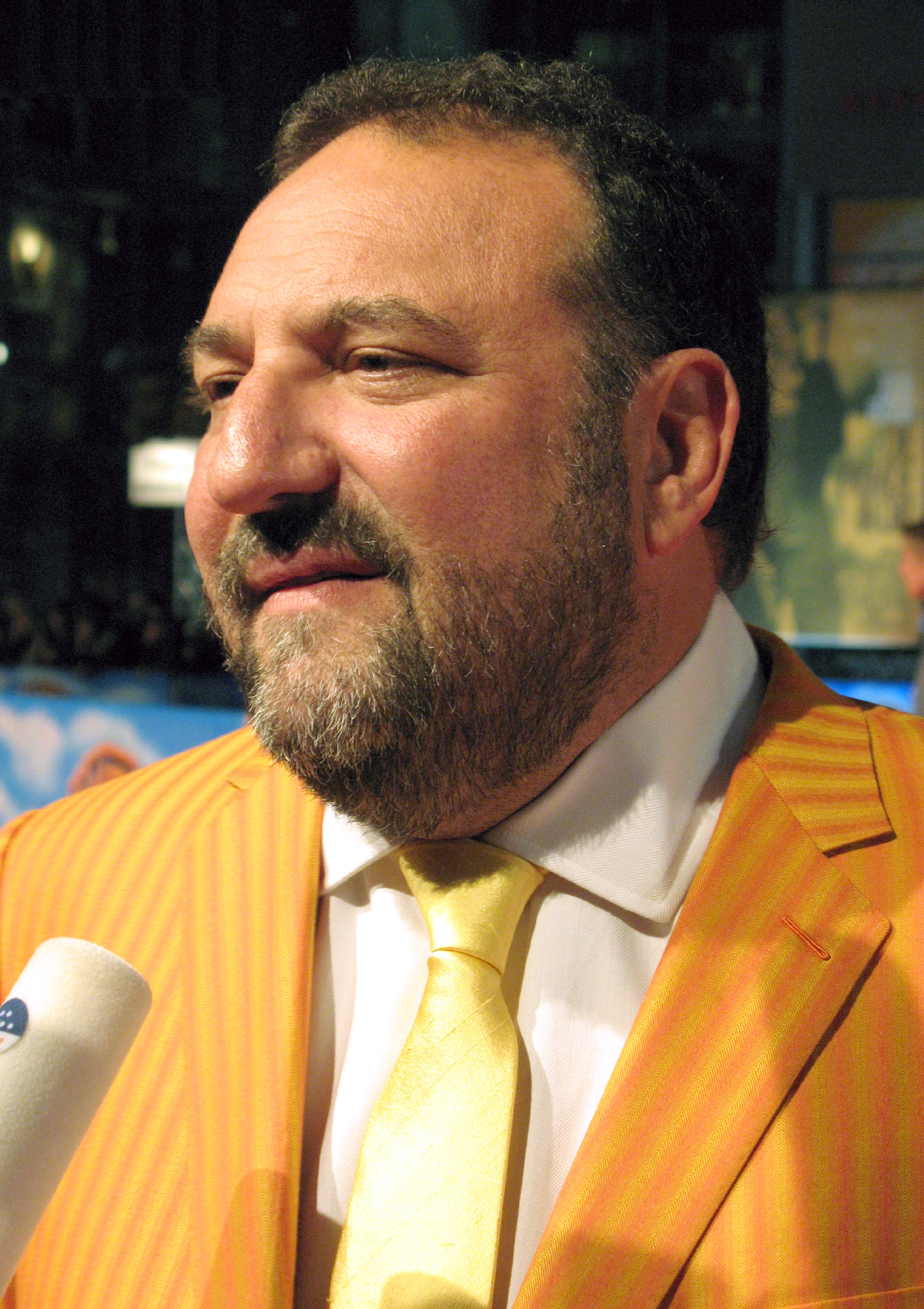
The producer Joel Silver was involved in early attempts to make a Wonder Woman film.

Development for a live-action Wonder Woman film began in 1996, with Ivan Reitman attached as producer and possible director. In 1999, the project became attached to screenwriter Jon Cohen and producer Joel Silver with the hope that Sandra Bullock would play Diana. By 2001, Todd Alcott was hired to write the screenplay, with Silver Pictures backing the project. At that time, Mariah Carey and Catherine Zeta-Jones were also rumored to be possible candidates for the role of Diana. Lucy Lawless, the star of Xena: Warrior Princess, was also under consideration for the part, although she was interested in playing a "flawed hero" version of the character. The screenplay went through various drafts written by Alcott, Cohen, Becky Johnston and Philip Levens. By August 2003, Levens had been replaced by Laeta Kalogridis.

In March 2005, Warner Bros. and Silver Pictures announced that Joss Whedon would write and direct the film. Early drafts of Whedon's screenplay included Steve Trevor as the narrator, a fierce battle between Diana and her mother over Trevor's welfare, and Trevor's need to frequently rescue Diana, who was rendered helpless by the modern world. During Whedon's tenure as screenwriter, Kate Beckinsale was being considered for the role of Diana. However, she did not like the script. Whedon, who wanted Angelina Jolie to star in the film, was not able to complete his screenplay and left the project in 2007. (Note: Attributed to multiple references:)

A day before Whedon's departure, Warner Bros. and Silver Pictures purchased a spec script for the film written by Matthew Jennison and Brent Strickland. Although the screenplay—which was set during World War II—had impressed Silver Pictures executives, Joel Silver said they purchased it to avoid future legal action if Warner Bros.' Wonder Woman film ended up bearing similarities to the script. Around the same time, Warner Bros. began development of a Justice League film with Michele and Kieran Mulroney writing the screenplay. The film, entitled Justice League: Mortal, would have featured Australian model Megan Gale as Diana in the character's cinematic debut. The film was later cancelled due to production delays and budgetary concerns. By April 2008, Silver had hired Jennison and Strickland to write a new script set in contemporary times that would not depict Diana's origin, but would explore the history of Themiscyra.

=== Development ===
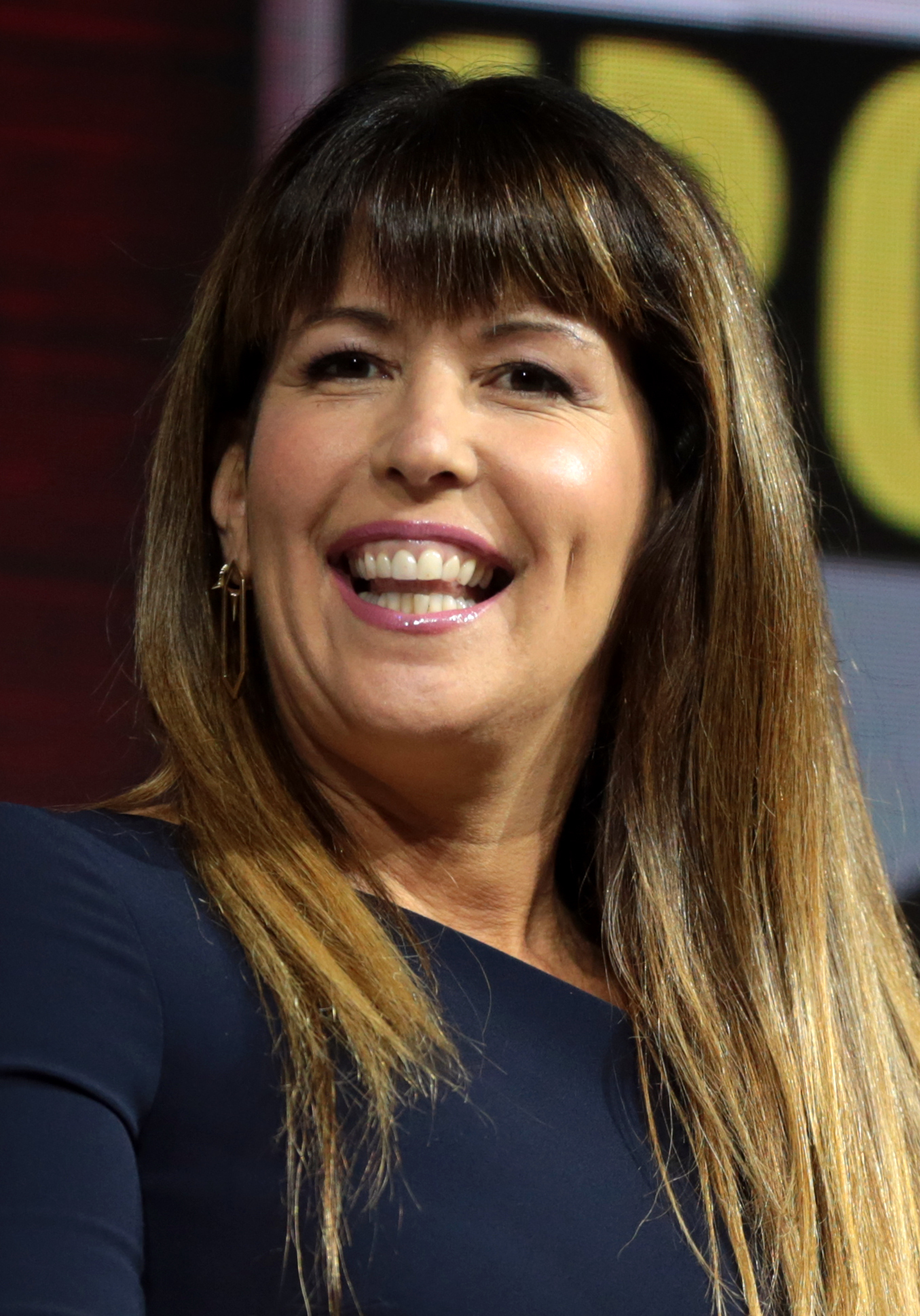
Director Patty Jenkins at San Diego Comic Con in 2018

Between 2010 and 2013, executives at Warner Bros. and DC Entertainment reiterated their intention to produce a Wonder Woman film. (Note: Attributed to multiple references:) In 2013, filmmaker Paul Feig said he had unsuccessfully pitched an action-comedy Wonder Woman film to Warner Bros. By October 2014, the studio was searching for a female director for the project. Michelle MacLaren was selected, (Note: Attributed to multiple references:) but she left the project due to creative differences. In 2015, Patty Jenkins accepted an offer to direct a Wonder Woman film based on a screenplay by Allan Heinberg and a story by Heinberg, Zack Snyder and Jason Fuchs. Heinberg's script was rewritten and completed by Jenkins and Geoff Johns, who were left out of the official credits by the WGA.

It was decided that Jenkins' film would include Diana's origin story. The character would be the same version that appeared in Batman v Superman: Dawn of Justice (2016). Diana's origin story would occur during World War I—a departure from her origin story in the comics, which depicts her supporting the Allies during World War II. Jenkins drew inspiration from William Moulton Marston's Wonder Woman stories of the 1940s and George Perez's stories of the 1980s, which modernized the character. The film also incorporates elements from The New 52 comic reboot, which depicts Wonder Woman as the daughter of Zeus. Jenkins cited Richard Donner's Superman (1978) as a significant influence on the film's tone and storytelling. She wanted Diana to be vulnerable, warm and "filled with love". She also wanted her to be a flawed character as opposed to one who is "impeccably right".

=== Casting ===
In 2013, Gal Gadot was cast as Diana for Zack Snyder's upcoming film Batman v Superman: Dawn of Justice (2016), and signed a three-picture deal with the studio. Snyder said Gadot's ability to be both kind and fierce made her stand out during auditions. Although Jenkins was at first disappointed that she was unable to assist in casting Diana, she eventually decided that Gadot was the perfect choice. She felt that Gadot shares "every quality" with Diana.

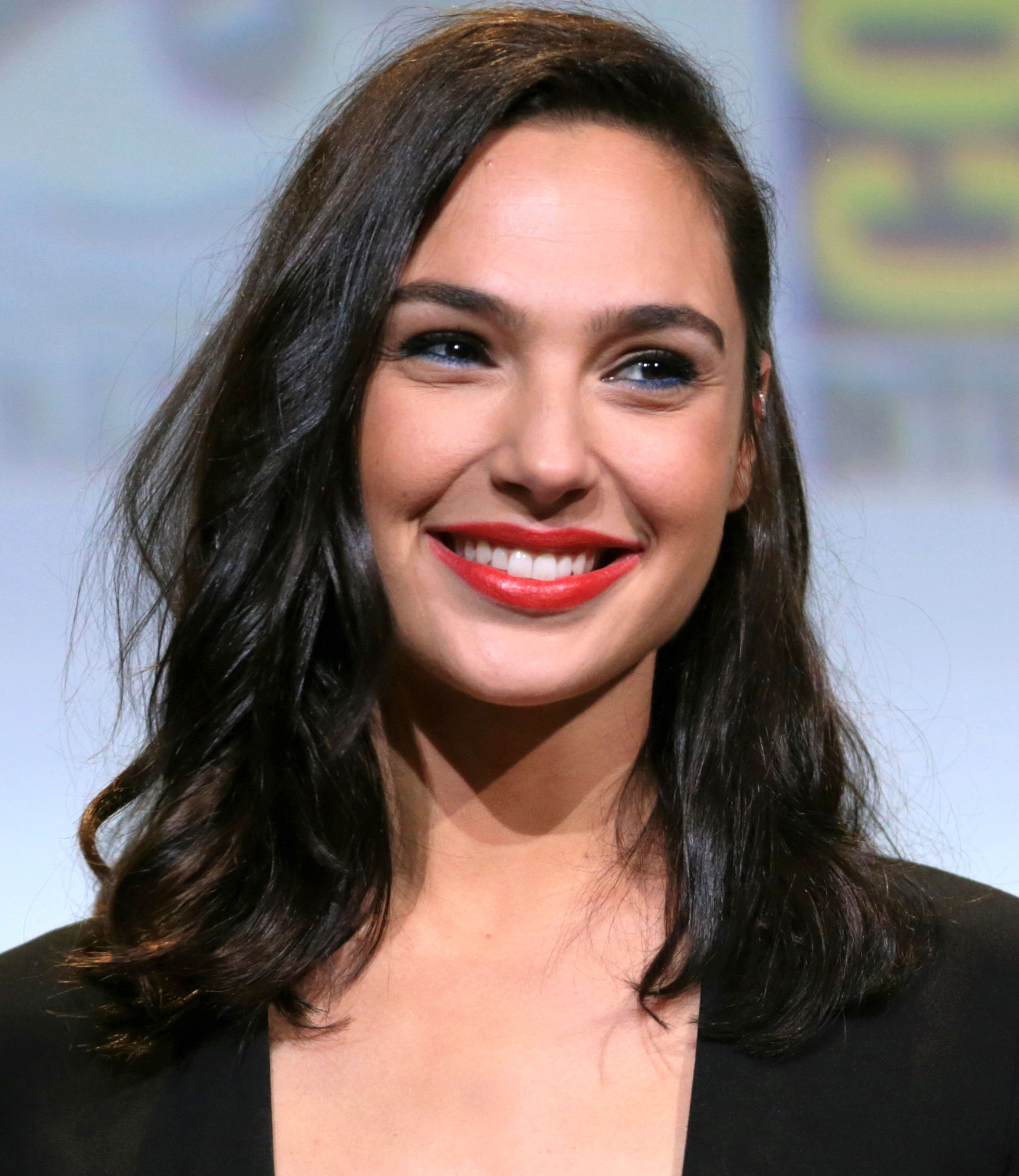
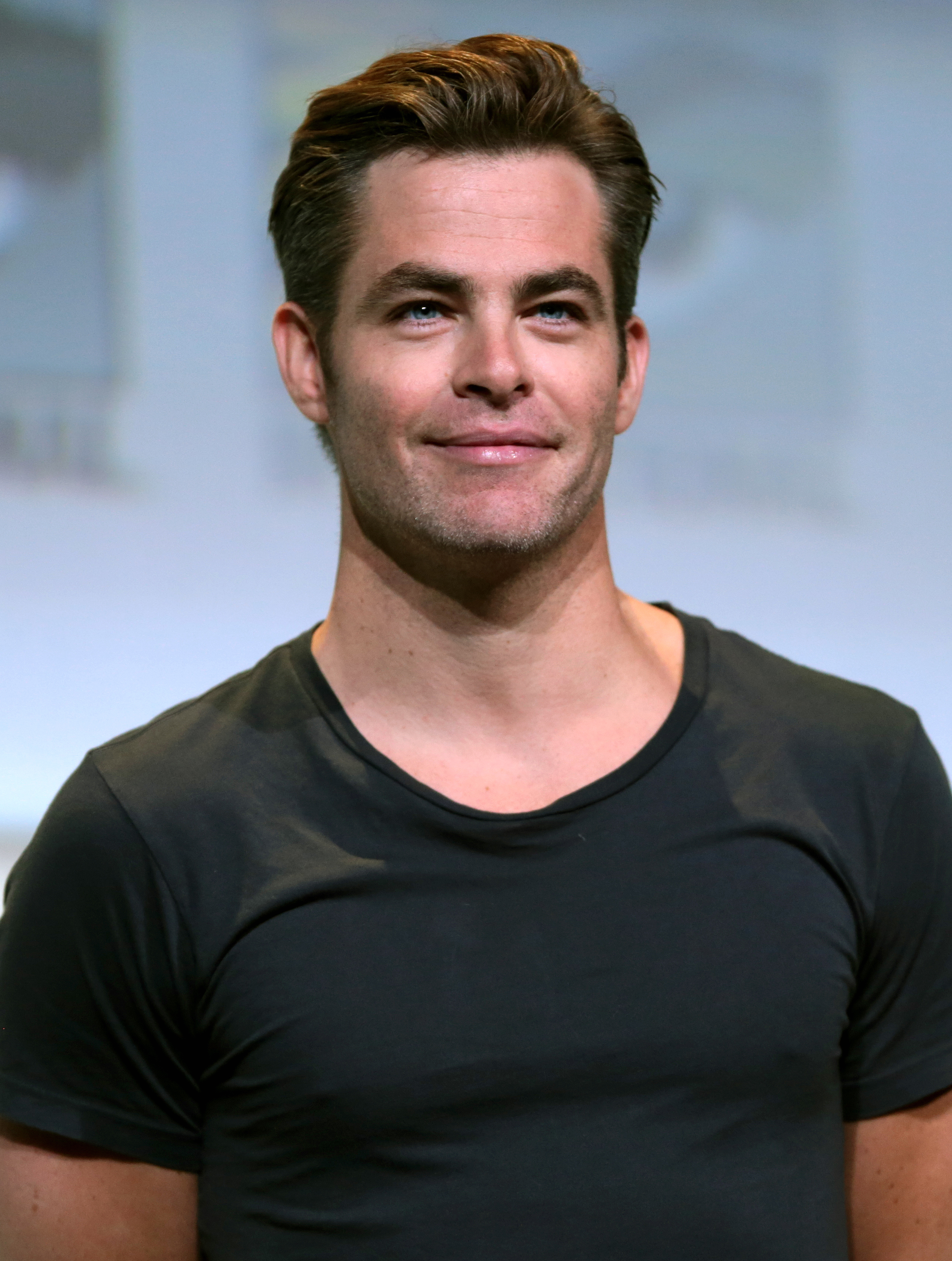
Gal Gadot (left) and Chris Pine at San Diego Comic-Con in 2016

Some criticized the casting, arguing that Gadot's Israeli heritage should have disqualified her from playing a character that is often seen as an American symbol of freedom. Others said she was too thin to portray Diana, who has been traditionally depicted as busty and muscular. Gadot dismissed the criticism, although she did build muscle for the role. She took lessons in swordsmanship, Kung Fu, kickboxing, capoeira, and Brazilian jiu-jitsu, as well as horseback riding. She trained six hours a day for six months, and gained 17 pounds. She said her training for the film was more intense than her training for the Israeli army.

Gadot has described the Diana of Wonder Woman as relatable, compassionate, and emotionally intelligent, with "the heart of a human". She explained that Diana is naive about the world and unaware of gender norms, inequality between women and men, and the rules of society. Gadot said Diana's ignorance causes her to view the world with genuine curiosity, (Note: Attributed to multiple references:) and that Wonder Woman can be viewed as a coming-of-age story. Gadot explained that when she and Jenkins had conversations about the character, they realized that Diana could be a normal woman who can become confused and lose her confidence. Gadot also described Diana as a feminist, and explained that her feminism is apparent in her ignorance of social roles and gender boundaries; to her, "everyone is equal."

Chris Pine was cast as Steve Trevor, and signed a multi-picture deal. He initially had no interest in playing the role, feeling that it was "second fiddle." However, after Jenkins described the film as a romance, he changed his mind. As a boy, Pine had idolized the fighter pilot Goose from Top Gun, and so the role of Trevor—who is both a pilot and a spy—felt like a childhood dream come true. Pine described Trevor as a worldly, charming and cynical rogue who has seen "the awful brutish nature of modern civilization".

Nicole Kidman was in negotiations for the role of Hippolyta, but could not commit due to scheduling conflicts with Big Little Lies. Charlize Theron turned down the role. Connie Nielsen recalled that Snyder pushed Jenkins to meet with her, despite Jenkins thinking Nielsen was too tough for the part. When Jenkins and Nielsen finally met, they quickly bonded, which led to Nielsen's casting. According to Nielsen, she worked out six hours a day to prepare for the film—two hours of weight training, two hours of sword training and two hours of horseback riding. She read The Amazons by Adrienne Mayor to familiarize herself with women warriors and said "I used what I learned in Mayor's book as a rallying cry for how I approached Hippolyta".

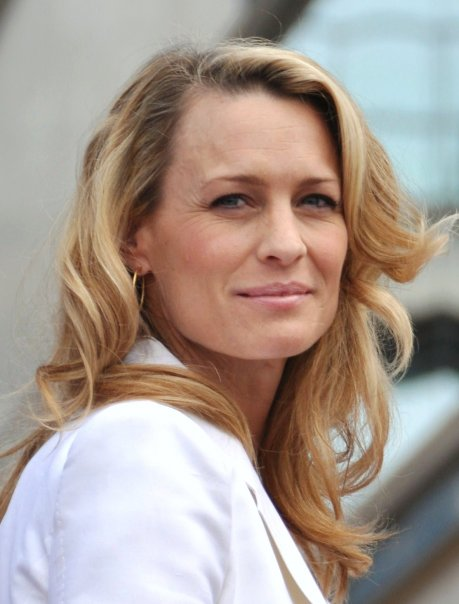
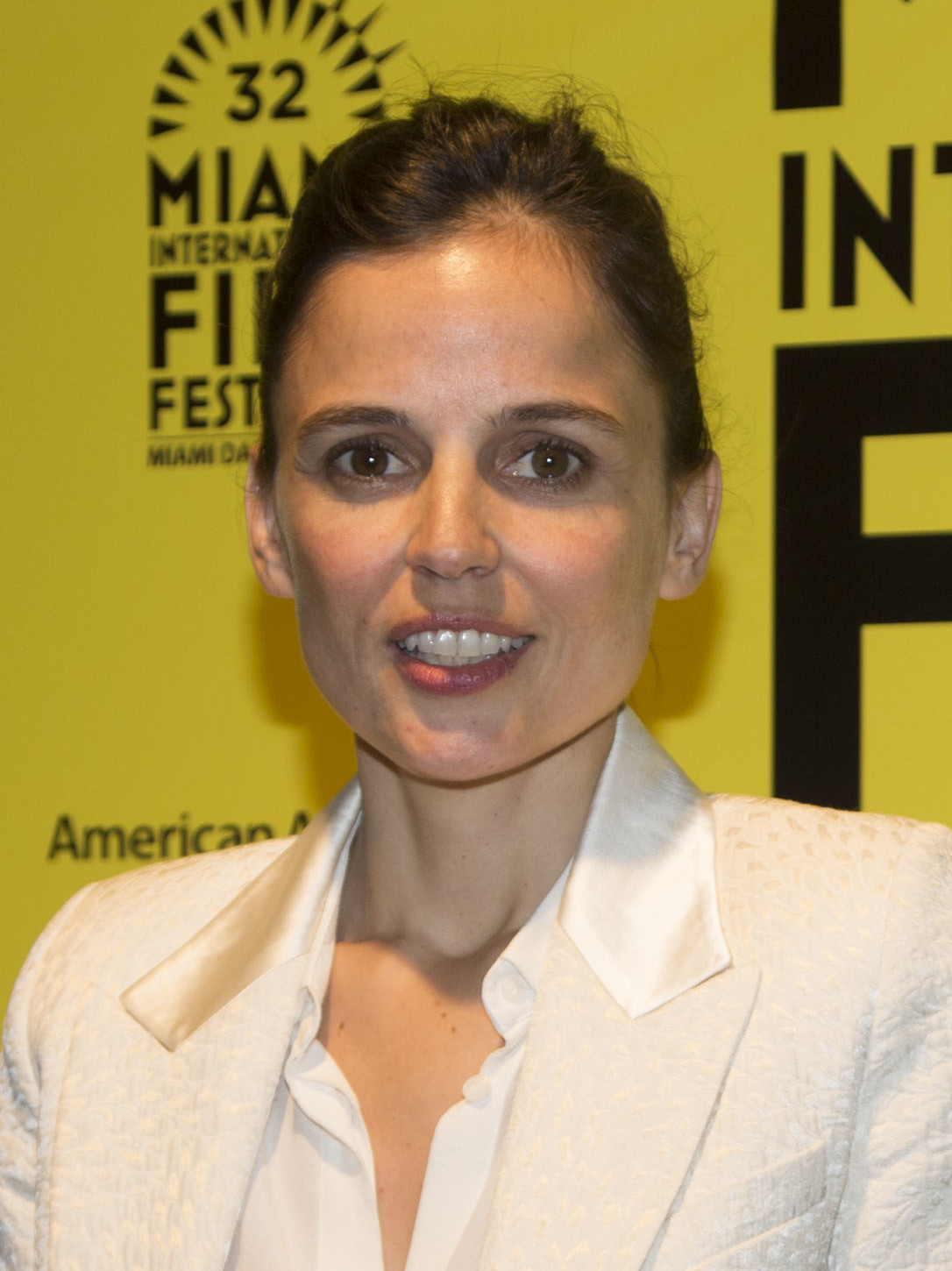
Robin Wright (left, pictured in 2009) and Elena Anaya (2015) have supporting roles in the film.

Elena Anaya was cast as Dr. Maru. Anaya said her character is the opposite of Diana, as Dr. Maru "loves rage and enjoys people's pain ... her purpose in life is to kill as many people as possible". Anaya said Dr. Maru's facial scars were the result of chemical tests she performed on herself. To prepare for the role, Anaya researched Fritz Haber, the scientist who created mustard gas.

Robin Wright plays the Amazon Antiope. Wright's preparation for the film included horseback riding, weight training, martial arts, and eating 2,000–3,000 calories a day. Wright said Antiope's duty is to ensure Diana is "the fiercest warrior of all time." According to Wright, Wonder Woman is about "love and justice."

Eugene Brave Rock was cast as Chief after an audition in which he forgot his lines. Brave Rock, who grew up in the Kainai Nation of southern Alberta, raised concerns with Jenkins over the presentation of his character in the film, particularly that he was not comfortable playing into stereotypes and that he was not keen on his character being known simply as "Chief". Jenkins responded by giving him a measure of creative control over his character, which he felt was "unprecedented". It was Brave Rock's idea to have Chief introduce himself to Diana in his native Blackfoot language.

Danny Huston described his character Erich Ludendorff as a stubborn and patriotic pragmatist who believes he is acting for the betterment of humanity. Huston said the "diabolical" and "tortured" Ludendorff believes that war is a "natural habitat" for humans. Huston said that Wonder Woman is an anti-war film.

=== Costume design ===
"I, as a woman, want Wonder Woman to be hot as hell, fight badass, and look great at the same time—the same way men want Superman to have huge pecs and an impractically big body. That makes them feel like the hero they want to be."

— Patty Jenkins

Diana's costume in Wonder Woman was designed by Lindy Hemming, who built upon Diana's costume from Batman v Superman. Hemming's design was influenced by ancient Greek and Roman armor. (Note: Attributed to multiple references:) It includes leather skirts modeled after pteruges worn by Hoplite soldiers, and gilded breastplates reflecting Amazon warrior culture. Hemming aimed to create empowering armor without veering into sexualization. She made the costume durable and flexible for the film's action sequences, and used body scanning technology to tailor it to Gadot's exact measurements. Jenkins and Hemming designed costumes for the other Amazons that would showcase their physical strength and highlight their toned shoulders and legs. The costumes included comic book tropes such as wrist braces and high heels, although the actors used flat-soled footwear for fighting sequences.

=== Filming ===
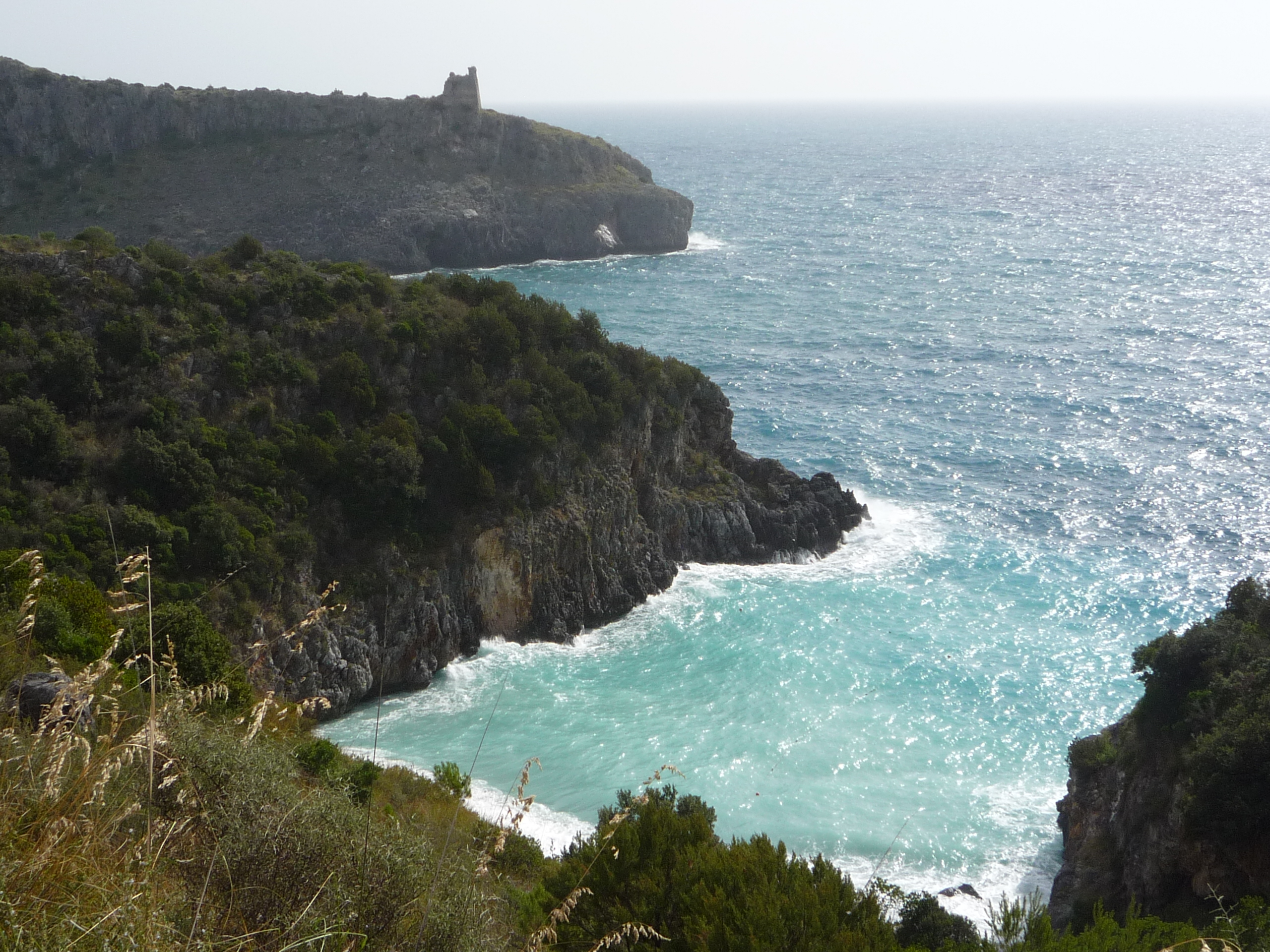
The Cilento Coast of southern Italy was used for the island Themyscira.

Production designer Aline Bonetto and location manager Charles Somers considered 47 countries as possible locations for Themyscira before settling on the Cilento Coast, a stretch of coastline on the Tyrrhenian Sea, located in the Province of Salerno in southern Italy. Bonetto explained that, "Italy had beautiful weather, a beautiful blue-green sea, not too much tide, not too much wave." The visual effects team would later add some digital cliffs to the location. For the battle sequence between Amazons and German soldiers on the beach of Themyscira, the crew built a rig that allowed the camera to move from a high vantage point down to ground level while capturing the action in slow motion. Jenkins shot Wonder Woman on 35mm film instead of digital video because she felt it would add to the escapism value of the film. Jenkins and director of photography Matt Jensen said the film's look was inspired by the paintings of John Singer Sargent.

Principal photography for Wonder Woman began on November 21, 2015. (Note: Attributed to multiple references:) Filming took place in England in the Lower Halstow village of Kent, at Hatfield House in Hertfordshire, and at Australia House. Filming locations in southern Italy included Sassi di Matera, Castel del Monte and Camerota. (Note: Attributed to multiple references:) Filming also occurred at the Louvre Museum in Paris, France. Principal photography finished on May 9, 2016, and reshoots took place that November, while Gadot was five months pregnant. A green cloth was placed over her pregnant belly so it could be edited out during post-production.

According to Jenkins, Warner Bros. mandated that she change the final act of the film near the end of production. She had wanted Diana to face Sir Patrick, but in the original script he did not turn into Ares. However, Jenkins said the studio demanded that Ares appear. Some fans and reviewers have criticized the end of the film for being unsatisfying and utilizing low-quality visual effects. Jenkins said the effects were rushed because they were created at the last minute.

=== Music ===
Rupert Gregson-Williams composed the film's musical score, with assistance from Evan Jolly, Tom Howe, Andrew Kawczynski and Paul Mounsey. (Note: Attributed to multiple references:) The Wonder Woman soundtrack was released on CD, digital and vinyl the same day as the film. (Note: Attributed to multiple references:)

== Marketing ==
In May 2017, a promotional sequence for Wonder Woman was released during the season finale of Supergirl, which featured Supergirl actress Melissa Benoist wearing Diana's boots with a remix of the song "These Boots Are Made for Walkin'". The sequence included an appearance by Lynda Carter, star of the 1970s Wonder Woman series, who plays the president of the United States on Supergirl. Warner Bros. spent over $3 million on television advertisements for Wonder Woman, compared to $2.6 million for the previous DCEU film Suicide Squad (2016).

According to a May 2017 survey conducted by the ticket retailer Fandango, Wonder Woman was the most anticipated film of summer 2017. In a separate poll, Fandango reported that 92% of those surveyed said they were looking forward to a film with a standalone woman superhero, while 87% wished Hollywood would make more woman-led superhero films. Ahead of the film's release, Fandango sold gift cards branded with Gal Gadot, while NASCAR driver Danica Patrick drove a car with a Wonder Woman paint scheme during two different races. (Note: Attributed to multiple references:)

== Release ==
Wonder Woman had its world premiere on May 25, 2017, at Pantages Theatre in Hollywood, Los Angeles, and its Latin America premiere in Mexico City on May 27. The film's London premiere, which was scheduled to take place on May 31 at the Odeon Leicester Square, was cancelled due to the Manchester Arena bombing. The film was released in Belgium, Singapore and South Korea on May 31, and in the rest of the world on June 2. (Note: Attributed to multiple references:) Wonder Woman was released in IMAX in certain territories.

=== Box office ===
Box office revenue			Box office ranking		Reference
United States and Canada	Other territories	Worldwide	All time U.S. and Canada	All time worldwide	Reference
$412,845,172	$411,125,510	$823,970,682	No. 47	No. 108	

Ahead of the release of Wonder Woman in the United States and Canada, predictions put its opening weekend gross at $65–75 million, and possibly as high as $105 million. (Note: Attributed to multiple references:) The film opened Friday, June 2, 2017, across 4,165 theaters and made $38.2 million on its opening day, including $3.7 million in IMAX. It had the all-time highest single-day gross for a woman-directed film, ahead of Catherine Hardwicke's Twilight (2008), (Note: Attributed to multiple references:) and its $103.3 million opening weekend was the highest for a film with a female director, surpassing Fifty Shades of Grey. About 9% ($9 million) of the opening weekend gross came from IMAX screenings at 343 theaters. In its second week, Wonder Woman grossed $58.5 million, topping the box office. It dropped 43.3% during its second weekend, better than the average 50–60% decline superhero films tended to see at the time. In its third weekend it grossed $41.2 million, nearly double what Batman v Superman ($23.3 million), Suicide Squad ($20.9 million) and Man of Steel ($20.7 million) each made in their third weekends.

Outside the US and Canada, Wonder Woman was released on the same day in 55 markets (72% of its total release) and was projected to debut with anywhere between $92–118 million. It opened to $125 million, including $38 million in China, $8.5 million in Korea, $8.4 million in Mexico, $8.3 million in Brazil and $7.5 million in the United Kingdom. In its second week of release, the film brought in another $60 million, holding the top spot in France, the UK, Australia and Brazil. In the Philippines, it earned $4.7 million, setting a record for the highest-earning non-holiday opening day and becoming the 9th-most successful commercial film of all time in the country. (Note: Attributed to multiple references:) The film opened in its last market, Japan, on August 25 and debuted to $3.4 million, helping the international gross cross the $400 million mark. The biggest markets for Wonder Woman outside the US and Canada were China (US$90 million) followed by Brazil (US$34 million), the UK (US$28 million), Australia ($23 million) and Mexico ($22 million).

Wonder Woman grossed a total of $412.8 million in the United States and Canada and $411.1 million in other territories for a worldwide total of $824 million, against an estimated production budget of $120–150 million. Estimates for the international gross the film needed to cover its costs and break even ranged from $300 million to $460 million. Deadline Hollywood calculated the film's net profit as $252.9 million. After taking into account home media revenues, Deadline placed Wonder Woman sixth on its list of "Most Valuable Blockbusters" of 2017. The film became the worldwide highest-grossing film directed by a woman, surpassing Jennifer Yuh Nelson's Kung Fu Panda 2 and Phyllida Lloyd's Mamma Mia! (Note: Attributed to multiple references:) It held the record until Hi, Mom surpassed it in 2021, followed by Barbie in 2023.

=== Bans in Arab countries ===
On May 31, Wonder Woman was banned in Lebanon after the Campaign to Boycott Supporters of Israel asked the Lebanese government to block the film because Gal Gadot is a former Israel Defense Forces soldier. The government had not banned Gadot's earlier Fast & Furious films, which screened in Lebanon. On June 6, Variety reported that Algiers, the capital of Algeria, had pulled Wonder Woman from a film festival. On June 7, Variety reported that a Tunisian court suspended the theatrical release of Wonder Woman after a lawsuit brought by the Al-Chaab party and the Tunisian Association of Young Lawyers to have the film blocked due to Gadot's military service and her public comments in support of the Israeli military during the 2014 Israel–Gaza conflict. Jordan also considered a ban and suspended screenings pending a decision, but ultimately did not ban the film. On June 30, Qatar issued a ban on the film.

=== Women-only screenings ===
Women-only screenings of Wonder Woman were held at an Alamo Drafthouse Cinema (ADC) theater in Austin, Texas. Activists on Facebook stated that the screenings were discriminatory against men. (Note: Attributed to multiple references:) An Albany Law School professor initiated a complaint with Austin's Equal Employment and Fair Housing Office claiming discrimination against male customers and male employees of the theater. The ADC theater chain responded with a statement saying the screenings "may have created confusion—we want everybody to see this film", and announced a similar screening at its Brooklyn, New York location. Tickets for the Brooklyn event sold out in less than an hour, prompting ADC to schedule additional screenings. ADC eventually admitted that the screenings were discriminatory and offered to send Wonder Woman DVDs to those who complained.

=== Home media ===
Wonder Woman was released on digital HD on August 29, 2017, and on Blu-ray, Blu-ray 3D, 4K Ultra-HD Blu-ray and DVD on September 19. The film debuted at the top of the NPD VideoScan disc sales chart as well as the Blu-ray Disc sales chart. The film's home video sales earned a revenue of $98.7 million with 3.9 million copies sold, making it the fourth best-selling title of 2017.

== Reception ==
=== Critical response ===
Wonder Woman received a highly positive response from critics, with some calling it the best DCEU film. Critics praised Jenkins' directing, the performances of the actors, the chemistry between Gadot and Pine, the musical score and the action sequences. (Note: Attributed to multiple references:) On the review aggregator Rotten Tomatoes, the film holds an approval rating of 93% based on 480 reviews, with an average rating of 7.7/10. The site's consensus reads: "Thrilling, earnest, and buoyed by Gal Gadot's charismatic performance, Wonder Woman succeeds in spectacular fashion." On Metacritic, the film has a weighted average score of 76 out of 100, based on 50 critics. Audiences polled by CinemaScore gave the film an average grade of "A" on an A+ to F scale, while PostTrak reported filmgoers gave it an 85% overall positive score and a 73% "definite recommend".

Critics praised Wonder Woman as the best DC film since The Dark Knight. (Note: Attributed to multiple references:) Chris Nashawaty of Entertainment Weekly applauded the film's "smart, slick, and satisfying" tone. Kelly Lawler of USA Today and Andrew Barker of Variety celebrated its feel-good tone, viewing it as a refreshing contrast to recent darker superhero films. (Note: Attributed to multiple references:) Barker called the film "boisterous, earnest, sometimes sloppy, yet consistently entertaining". Writing in the San Francisco Chronicle, Mick LaSalle lauded the actors' performances and the film's humor. Richard Roeper of the Chicago Sun-Times described Gadot's performance as inspirational, heroic, heartfelt and endearing. Alex Abad-Santos of Vox described Steve Trevor as "the superhero girlfriend comic book movies need".

A. O. Scott of The New York Times wrote that Wonder Woman "briskly shakes off blockbuster branding imperatives and allows itself to be something relatively rare in the modern superhero cosmos ... a movie". Michael Phillips of the Chicago Tribune felt the film carried an "unusual gravity" for a comic book adaptation. Writing for IndieWire, Katie Erbland praised "the internal battles of its compelling heroine", while Alonso Duralde of TheWrap felt that "Diana's scenes of action are thrilling precisely because they're meant to stop war." Ann Hornaday of The Washington Post lauded the film's detailed plot while comparing the slow-motion action sequences to those of The Matrix. Stephanie Zacharek of Time magazine hailed Wonder Woman as a "cut above" most recent superhero films, while praising Gadot's performance as "charming" and "marvelous".

Elise Jost of Moviepilot described Diana as genuine, fun, and "the warm source of energy" at the center of the film. Jost felt that Gadot was such a perfect choice for Diana that she merged with the character. Writing for HuffPost, G. Roger Denson described the "No Man's Land" sequence as "one of the most powerfully mythopoetic scenes ever filmed." Rachel Becker of The Verge thought the film succeeded in evoking the real and horrifying history of chemical warfare. Peter Travers of Rolling Stone criticized Wonder Woman for spending too much time on Diana's "slogging origin story", while Steve Rose of The Guardian felt the film was not subversive enough towards patriarchal society.

=== Cultural response ===
==== Feminist critiques ====
Commentators have debated about whether Wonder Woman is a feminist film, and if so, whether it is feminist enough. Kyle Killian of Psychology Today felt there was a contradiction in the construction of Diana, who he viewed as a highly sexualized warrior; he said physical appearance and sexiness should not be the focus of a feminist icon. Christina Cauterucci of Slate similarly felt that Diana's status as a feminist symbol was undermined by her sex appeal. Theresa Harold of Metro criticized Diana's costume as "a teenager's wet dream", while Jill Lepore of The New Yorker referred to Diana as "an implausible post-feminist hero". Susannah Breslin described Diana as "a Playmate with a lasso" who represents "female power with no balls".

Zoe Williams said the choice to portray Diana as well-muscled and powerful is "a feminist act" even though she is "sort of naked" for much of the film. Williams contrasted Diana with the female action heroes Sarah Connor, Ellen Ripley and Lara Croft, whom she suggests were all constructed for the male gaze, in which a "female warrior becomes a sex object". Author Valerie Frankel argued that Wonder Woman subverts the male gaze. (Note: Attributed to multiple references:)

Filmmaker James Cameron called Jenkins' version of Diana "an objectified icon" and described the film as "a step backwards". (Note: Attributed to multiple references:) Julie Miller argued that Jenkins envisioned Diana as "a woman who exuded both femininity and strength, along with genuine confusion as to why men would treat women differently than they do other men". The feminist activist Gloria Steinem praised Wonder Woman and presented Hillary Clinton with the first Wonder Woman Award as part of the "Speaking Truth to Power Awards" held by the Women's Media Center. Clinton described the film as inspirational.

==== Jewish identity and representation of Israel ====
The release of the film sparked discussions about the racial identity of Jews, including whether Gal Gadot should be considered a woman of color due to her Jewish and Israeli heritage, as well as broader conversations surrounding race in the United States. Joel Finkelstein of the Jewish news website The Forward used Gadot as a starting point for an exploration of whether Jews should be considered white.

According to Jordan Hoffman of Times of Israel, the plot of Wonder Woman reflects the Jewish concept of tikkun olam (repairing the world), as Diana seeks peace and battles the god of war. For Israeli audiences, there was often a sense of pride in seeing a Jewish woman lead such a prominent international film. For some, Wonder Woman became a celebration of Israeli identity. Danielle Berrin of The Jewish Journal said that Diana's origins in battling Nazis during World War II lent her character symbolic importance for Jewish audiences, aligning with a narrative of resistance and empowerment. Emily Shire of Bustle argued that Gadot's portrayal of Diana challenged longstanding stereotypes of Jewish women, who have often been relegated to secondary or unattractive roles in film. Gadot's Diana, by contrast, presented a powerful and visually striking image of Jewish femininity, offering a new, empowering archetype for Jewish women in Hollywood. However, some feminists and some Wonder Woman fans have struggled to support Gadot due to her stance on Israel.

Annika Hernroth-Rothstein of Israel Hayom felt that Wonder Woman is a feminist masterpiece which portrays a strong, independent woman who challenges traditional female stereotypes. She argued that Wonder Woman is powerful not because Gadot is Israeli, but because the film symbolizes Israel's strength and potential.

=== Accolades ===
Award	Date of ceremony	Category	Recipient(s)	Result	Ref.
AARP's Movies for Grownups Awards	February 5, 2018	Readers' Choice Poll	Wonder Woman	Won	
American Film Institute Awards	January 5, 2018	Top Ten Films of the Year	Wonder Woman	Won	
Art Directors Guild Awards	January 27, 2018	Excellence in Production Design for a Fantasy Film	Aline Bonetto	Nominated	
Casting Society of America	January 18, 2018	Feature Big Budget – Drama	Lora Kennedy, Kristy Carlson, Lucinda Syson, Jeanette Benzie (Associate)	Nominated	
Cinema Audio Society Awards	February 24, 2018	Outstanding Achievement in Sound Mixing for a Motion Picture – Live Action	Chris Munro, Chris Burdon, Gilbert Lake, Alan Meyerson, Nick Kray and Glen Gathard	Nominated	
Costume Designers Guild Awards	February 20, 2018	Excellence in Sci-Fi/Fantasy Film	Lindy Hemming	Won	
Critics' Choice Movie Awards	January 11, 2018	Best Action Movie	Wonder Woman	Won	
Critics' Choice Movie Awards	January 11, 2018	Best Costume Design	Lindy Hemming	Nominated	
Critics' Choice Movie Awards	January 11, 2018	Best Visual Effects	Wonder Woman	Nominated	
Detroit Film Critics Society	December 7, 2017	Breakthrough	Gal Gadot	Nominated	
Dragon Awards	September 3, 2017	Best Science Fiction or Fantasy Movie	Wonder Woman	Won	
Dublin Film Critics' Circle	December 13, 2017	Best Director	Patty Jenkins	Runner-up	
EDA Awards	January 9, 2018	Best Woman Director	Patty Jenkins	Nominated	
EDA Awards	January 9, 2018	Outstanding Achievement by A Woman in The Film Industry	Patty Jenkins	Nominated	
Empire Awards	March 18, 2018	Best Actress	Gal Gadot	Nominated	
Empire Awards	March 18, 2018	Best Director	Patty Jenkins	Nominated	
Empire Awards	March 18, 2018	Best Film	Wonder Woman	Nominated	
Empire Awards	March 18, 2018	Best Sci-Fi/Fantasy	Wonder Woman	Won	
Golden Reel Awards	February 18, 2018	Feature Motion Picture – Music Score	Wonder Woman	Nominated	
Golden Schmoes Awards	March 4, 2018	Most Overrated Movie of the Year	Wonder Woman	Runner-up	
Golden Schmoes Awards	March 4, 2018	Biggest Surprise of the Year	Wonder Woman	Runner-up	
Golden Schmoes Awards	March 4, 2018	Best Actress of the Year	Gal Gadot	Nominated	
Golden Schmoes Awards	March 4, 2018	Breakthrough Performance of the Year	Gal Gadot	Nominated	
Golden Schmoes Awards	March 4, 2018	Best Blu-Ray of the Year	Wonder Woman	Nominated	
Golden Schmoes Awards	March 4, 2018	Best Action Sequence of the Year	No Man's Land Battle	Nominated	
Golden Schmoes Awards	March 4, 2018	Most Memorable Scene in a Movie	No Man's Land Battle	Nominated	
Golden Schmoes Awards	March 4, 2018	Best T&A of the Year	Gal Gadot	Runner-up	
Golden Tomato Awards	January 3, 2018	Best Wide Release 2017	Wonder Woman	4th place	
Golden Tomato Awards	January 3, 2018	Best Comic Book/Graphic Novel Movie 2017	Wonder Woman	Won	
Golden Trailer Awards	June 6, 2017	Best of Show	Wonder Woman	Won	
Golden Trailer Awards	June 6, 2017	Best Fantasy Adventure	Wonder Woman	Won	
Golden Trailer Awards	June 6, 2017	Best Summer 2017 Blockbuster Trailer	Wonder Woman	Nominated	
Golden Trailer Awards	June 6, 2017	Best Fantasy / Adventure Poster	Wonder Woman	Nominated	
Golden Trailer Awards	June 6, 2017	Best Summer 2017 Blockbuster Poster	Wonder Woman	Won	
Golden Trailer Awards	May 31, 2018	Best Action TV Spot	Wonder Woman "Together"	Nominated	
Golden Trailer Awards	May 31, 2018	Best Action Poster	Wonder Woman "One Sheet"	Won	
Golden Trailer Awards	May 31, 2018	Best Action Poster	Wonder Woman "One Sheet" P+A	Nominated	
Golden Trailer Awards	May 31, 2018	Best Billboard	Wonder Woman	Nominated	
Golden Trailer Awards	May 31, 2018	Best International Poster	Wonder Woman "Walking"	Won	
Golden Trailer Awards	May 31, 2018	Best Opening Title Sequence or Closing Credit Sequence	Wonder Woman "Film Title"	Nominated	
Golden Trailer Awards	May 31, 2018	Best Summer Blockbuster Poster	Wonder Woman "One Sheet"	Nominated	
Hollywood Music in Media Awards	November 16, 2017	Best Original Score – Sci-Fi/Fantasy Film	Rupert Gregson-Williams	Nominated	
Hugo Awards	August 19, 2018	Best Dramatic Presentation	Patty Jenkins (director), Allan Heinberg (screenplay, story), Zack Snyder (story), Jason Fuchs (story)	Won	
ICG Publicists Awards	March 2, 2018	Motion Picture	Wonder Woman	Nominated	
Los Angeles Online Film Critics Society	January 3, 2018	Best Female Director	Patty Jenkins	Nominated	
Los Angeles Online Film Critics Society	January 3, 2018	Best Stunt Work	Wonder Woman	Nominated	
Los Angeles Online Film Critics Society	January 3, 2018	Best Action/War	Wonder Woman	Nominated	
Los Angeles Online Film Critics Society	January 3, 2018	Best Blockbuster	Wonder Woman	Won	
Los Angeles Online Film Critics Society	January 3, 2018	Best Visual Effects	Wonder Woman	Nominated	
Movieguide Awards	February 2, 2018	Best Movie for Mature Audiences	Wonder Woman	Nominated	
MTV Movie & TV Awards	June 18, 2018	Best Fight	Gal Gadot vs. German Soldiers	Won	
MTV Movie & TV Awards	June 18, 2018	Best Hero	Gal Gadot	Nominated	
MTV Movie & TV Awards	June 18, 2018	Best Movie	Wonder Woman	Nominated	
Kids' Choice Awards	March 24, 2018	Favorite Movie	Wonder Woman	Nominated	
Kids' Choice Awards	March 24, 2018	Favorite Movie Actress	Gal Gadot	Nominated	
National Board of Review	January 9, 2018	Spotlight Award	Wonder Woman, Patty Jenkins and Gal Gadot	Won	
Palm Springs International Film Festival	January 2, 2018	Rising Star Award – Actress	Gal Gadot	Won	
Producers Guild of America Awards	January 20, 2018	Best Theatrical Motion Picture	Charles Roven, Richard Suckle, Zack Snyder and Deborah Snyder	Nominated	
Santa Barbara Film Festival	February 3, 2018	Virtuosos Award	Gal Gadot	Won	
Satellite Awards	February 10, 2018	Best Adapted Screenplay	Allan Heinberg	Nominated	
Satellite Awards	February 10, 2018	Best Original Score	Rupert Gregson-Williams	Won	
Satellite Awards	February 10, 2018	Best Visual Effects	Wonder Woman	Nominated	
Saturn Awards	June 27, 2018	Best Comic-to-Film Motion Picture	Wonder Woman	Nominated	
Saturn Awards	June 27, 2018	Best Director	Patty Jenkins	Nominated	
Saturn Awards	June 27, 2018	Best Writing	Allan Heinberg	Nominated	
Saturn Awards	June 27, 2018	Best Actress	Gal Gadot	Won	
Saturn Awards	June 27, 2018	Best Supporting Actor	Chris Pine	Nominated	
Saturn Awards	June 27, 2018	Best Costume Design	Lindy Hemming	Nominated	
Screen Actors Guild Awards	January 21, 2018	Outstanding Performance by a Stunt Ensemble in a Motion Picture	Wonder Woman	Won	
Taurus World Stunt Awards	May 12, 2018	Best Fight	Caitlin Dechelle, Oliver Gough, Ian Pead, Nick Mitchell Roeten and Luke Scott	Nominated	
Taurus World Stunt Awards	May 12, 2018	Best Overall Stunt by a Stunt Woman	Georgina Armstrong, Mickey Facchinello, Kim McGarrity, Natalie Padilla and Tilly Powell	Won	
Taurus World Stunt Awards	May 12, 2018	Best Stunt Coordinator or/and 2nd Unit Director	Damon Caro, Tim Rigby and Marcus Shakesheff	Won	
Teen Choice Awards	August 13, 2017	Choice Movie: Action	Wonder Woman	Won	
Teen Choice Awards	August 13, 2017	Choice Movie Actor: Action	Chris Pine	Won	
Teen Choice Awards	August 13, 2017	Choice Movie Actress: Action	Gal Gadot	Won	
Teen Choice Awards	August 13, 2017	Choice Movie: Ship	Gal Gadot and Chris Pine	Nominated	
Teen Choice Awards	August 13, 2017	Choice Liplock	Gal Gadot and Chris Pine	Nominated	
Teen Choice Awards	August 13, 2017	Choice Movie: Summer	Wonder Woman	Nominated	
Teen Choice Awards	August 13, 2017	Choice Movie Actor: Summer	Chris Pine	Nominated	
Teen Choice Awards	August 13, 2017	Choice Movie Actress: Summer	Gal Gadot	Nominated	
USC Scripter Awards	February 10, 2018	Best Adapted Screenplay	Allan Heinberg and William Moulton Marston	Nominated	
Washington D.C. Area Film Critics Association	December 8, 2017	Best Production Design	Aline Bonetto and Anna Lynch-Robinson	Nominated	
Women Film Critics Circle	December 17, 2017	Women's Work: Best Ensemble	Wonder Woman	Nominated	
Women Film Critics Circle	December 17, 2017	Best Female Hero	Gal Gadot	Won	
Women Film Critics Circle	December 17, 2017	Best Equality of the Sexes	Wonder Woman	Nominated	

== Sequel ==
Gadot initially signed a contract for three DC Extended Universe (DCEU) films, including Wonder Woman, a contract which was later extended to include additional DCEU projects. Jenkins initially signed on for only one film, but began working on a sequel with Geoff Johns. At the 2017 San Diego Comic-Con, Warner Bros. officially announced a sequel, initially titled Wonder Woman 2, set for release in December 2019. It was confirmed in September 2017 that Jenkins and Gadot would return for the sequel, and that David Callaham would co-write the script with Jenkins and Johns.

In March 2018, Kristen Wiig was confirmed to play Cheetah, the villain of the film. That same month, it was announced that Pedro Pascal would have a key role in the film. By May, long-time DCEU producer Zack Snyder confirmed that he, along with his wife Deborah Snyder, would serve as producers on the Wonder Woman sequel. In June, the title of the film was announced as Wonder Woman 1984. The film's release was delayed several times, due in part to the COVID-19 pandemic, and it was not released until December 25, 2020. Following Wonder Woman 1984, plans for Wonder Woman 3 were cancelled during a restructuring of the DC Universe (DCU) under new co-CEOs James Gunn and Peter Safran.

== See also ==
- Women warriors in literature and culture
