= Acquafredda (Maratea) =

Coastal hamlet in Maratea, Italy

- Frazione
- Location within Basilicata
- Coordinates: 40.036°N 15.668°E
- Country: Italy
- Region: Basilicata
- Province: Potenza
- Comune: Maratea
- Time zone: UTC+1 (CET)
  - Summer (DST): UTC+2 (CEST)
- Postal code: 85046

Acquafredda is a coastal hamlet (frazione) in the municipality of Maratea, Province of Potenza, Basilicata, southern Italy. It is situated on the Tyrrhenian Sea at the northern end of the Maratea coastline. The settlement takes its name from a freshwater spring that flows onto the nearby Portacquafridda beach. The hamlet's beaches have held Blue Flag certification from the Foundation for Environmental Education since 2007. Villa Nitti, the early twentieth-century summer residence of former Italian prime minister Francesco Saverio Nitti, is located in Acquafredda.

== Geography ==
Acquafredda lies at the foot of the Serra del Tuono massif, approximately 8 kilometres (5.0 mi) north of the centre of Maratea. The coastline is characterised by rocky cliffs, small coves, and clear waters, with pine forests descending from the surrounding hills to the shore.

The hamlet's beaches extend along the coast from south to north: Porticello, Marizza, Grotta della Scala (accessible only by sea), Luppa, and Anginarra. Luppa and Anginarra are two rocky promontories connected by a rock platform, forming one of the larger shores on the Maratea coast. A freshwater spring flows into the sea near Marizza beach, giving the settlement its name (acqua fredda, Italian for "cold water").

== History ==
The settlement dates to the eighteenth century, when economic growth in the Maratea area led to the development of new population centres. Between 1566 and 1595, a series of coastal watchtowers was constructed along the Maratea coastline, including in the Acquafredda area, as defences against maritime raids.

On 4 July 1848, during the revolutions of that year, the patriot Costabile Carducci was killed at Acquafredda by the pro-Bourbon partisan Vincenzo Peluso of Sapri. Carducci was later buried in the local parish church, where a commemorative plaque marks his grave.

In the early twentieth century, Francesco Saverio Nitti, Prime Minister of Italy from 1919 to 1920, built a summer villa at Acquafredda. Villa Nitti became a gathering place for anti-fascist intellectuals, including Giovanni Amendola, during Nitti's period of internal exile between 1922 and 1923.

== Blue Flag certification ==
The Acquafredda beach has been awarded the Blue Flag by the Foundation for Environmental Education annually since 2007. Acquafredda is one of eight beaches within the Maratea municipality to hold the certification, alongside Santa Teresa, Calaficarra, Macarro, Illicini, Nera, Castrocucco, and Secca di Castrocucco. In 2025, Maratea was one of five municipalities in Basilicata to receive the Blue Flag.

== Transport ==
Acquafredda is served by its own railway station on the Naples–Reggio Calabria line, operated by Trenitalia. The hamlet is also accessible via the SS18 state road.
