= Villammare =

- Frazione
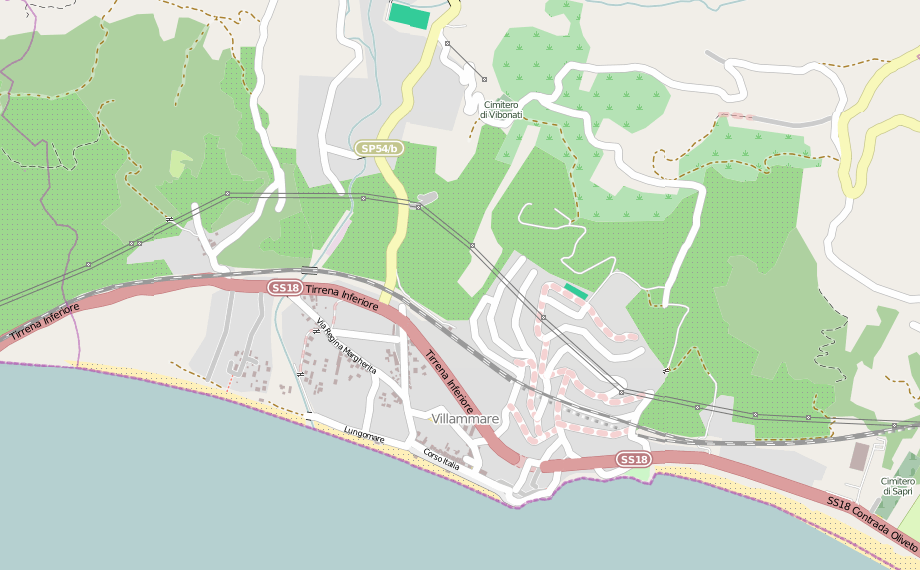
- Village's map (OpenStreetMap)

- Location of Villammare in Italy
- Coordinates: 40°4′44.76″N 15°35′16.69″E
- Country: Italy
- Region: Campania
- Province: Salerno (SA)
- Comune: Vibonati
- Elevation: 6 m (20 ft)

Population (2009)
  - Total: 1,024
- Demonym: Villammaresi
- Time zone: UTC+1 (CET)
  - Summer (DST): UTC+2 (CEST)
- Postal code: 84079
- Dialing code: (+39) 0973
- Patron saint: St. Mary of Portosalvo
- Website: Official website

Villammare is a southern Italian village and the only hamlet (frazione) of Vibonati, a municipality in the province of Salerno, Campania. As of 2009 its population was of 1,024.

== History ==
Anciently named Petrasia, the village developed urbanistically in the 1950s due to sea tourism.

== Geography ==
Villammare is located in southern Cilento, on the Gulf of Policastro, few km to the borders of Basilicata. It stretches along the Cilentan Coast, by the Tyrrhenian Sea, between the nearby village of Capitello (3 km far) and the town of Sapri (4 km). It is 3 km far from Vibonati, 4,5 from Ispani, 6 from Policastro and 11 from Tortorella.

Crossed by the national highway SS18 in north, parallel to the railway line linking Naples and Salerno to Reggio Calabria, Villammare had a minor train station, named "Vibonati", closed in 2002.

== Culture ==
From 2002 the village hosts a short film festival for newcomer directors, named Villammare Film Festival, or Mediterraneoincorto. It takes place in the first week of September in the square Maria Santissima di Portosalvo.

== See also ==
- Cilentan dialect
- Cilento and Vallo di Diano National Park
