= Capitello =

- Frazione
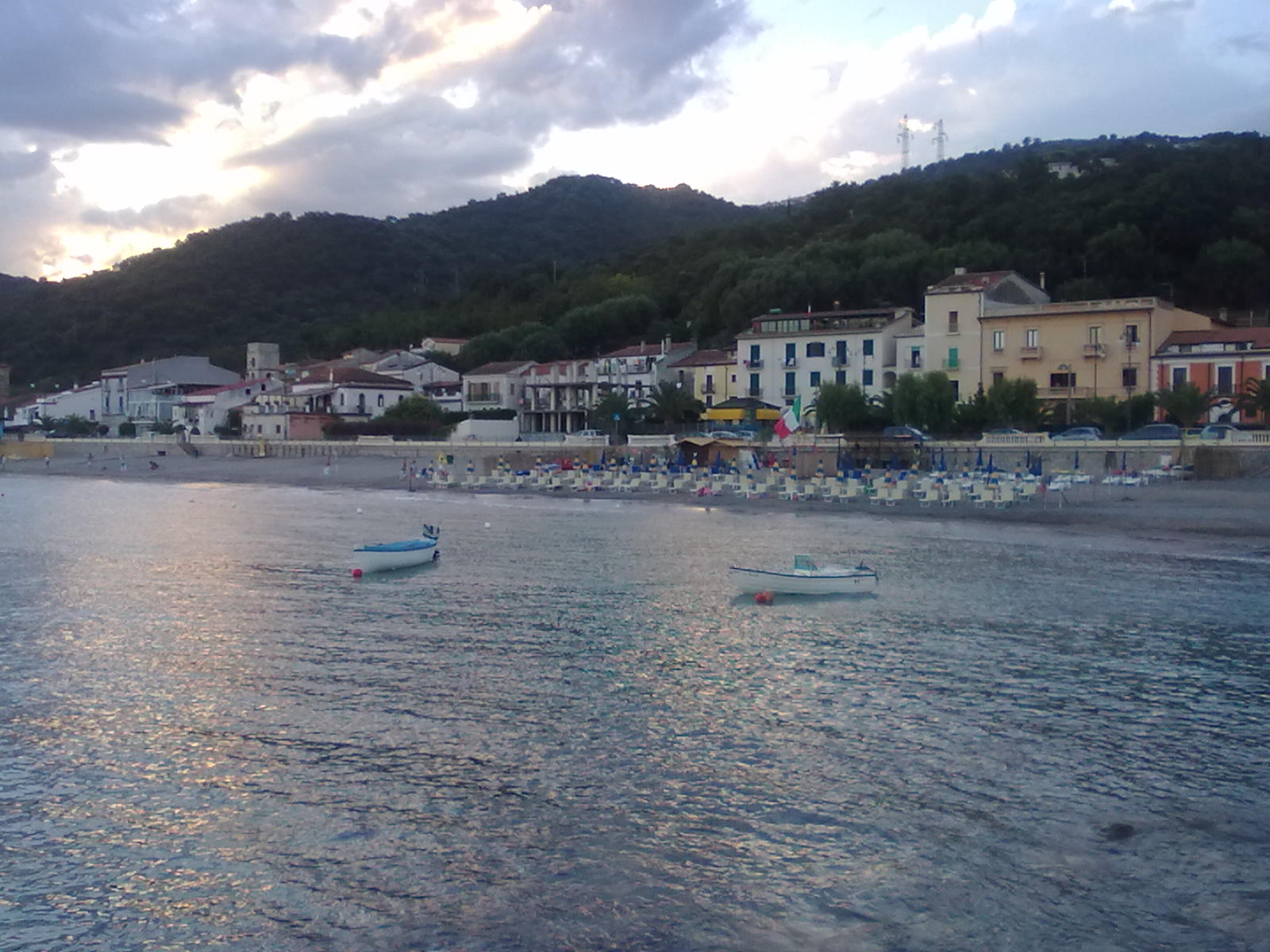
- The coastline of Capitello

- Location of Capitello in Italy
- Coordinates: 40°4′36″N 15°33′27″E
- Country: Italy
- Region: Campania
- Province: Salerno (SA)
- Comune: Ispani
- Elevation: 5 m (16 ft)

Population (2009)
  - Total: 626
- Demonym: Capitellesi
- Time zone: UTC+1 (CET)
  - Summer (DST): UTC+2 (CEST)
- Postal code: 84050
- Dialing code: (+39) 0973
- Patron saint: St. Anthony of Padua

Capitello is a southern Italian village and hamlet (frazione) of Ispani, a municipality in the province of Salerno, Campania. As of 2009 its population was of 626.

== History ==
The village, whose name means "capital" (the architectural element) in Italian, was a municipality before 1861, when it became a hamlet of Ispani. From 1928 to 1948 it became the seat of a new municipality that included Santa Marina, Ispani and Policastro.

== Geography ==
Capitello is located in southern Cilento, on the Gulf of Policastro, next to the borders of Basilicata. It stretches along the Cilentan Coast, by the Tyrrhenian Sea, between the nearby villages of Policastro and Villammare (both 3 km far). It is 2 km far from Ispani, 4 from San Cristoforo, 6 from Santa Marina and Vibonati and 7 from Sapri.

Crossed by the national highway SS18 in the middle, and by the railway line linking Naples and Salerno to Reggio Calabria, Capitello had a minor train station closed in early 2000s.

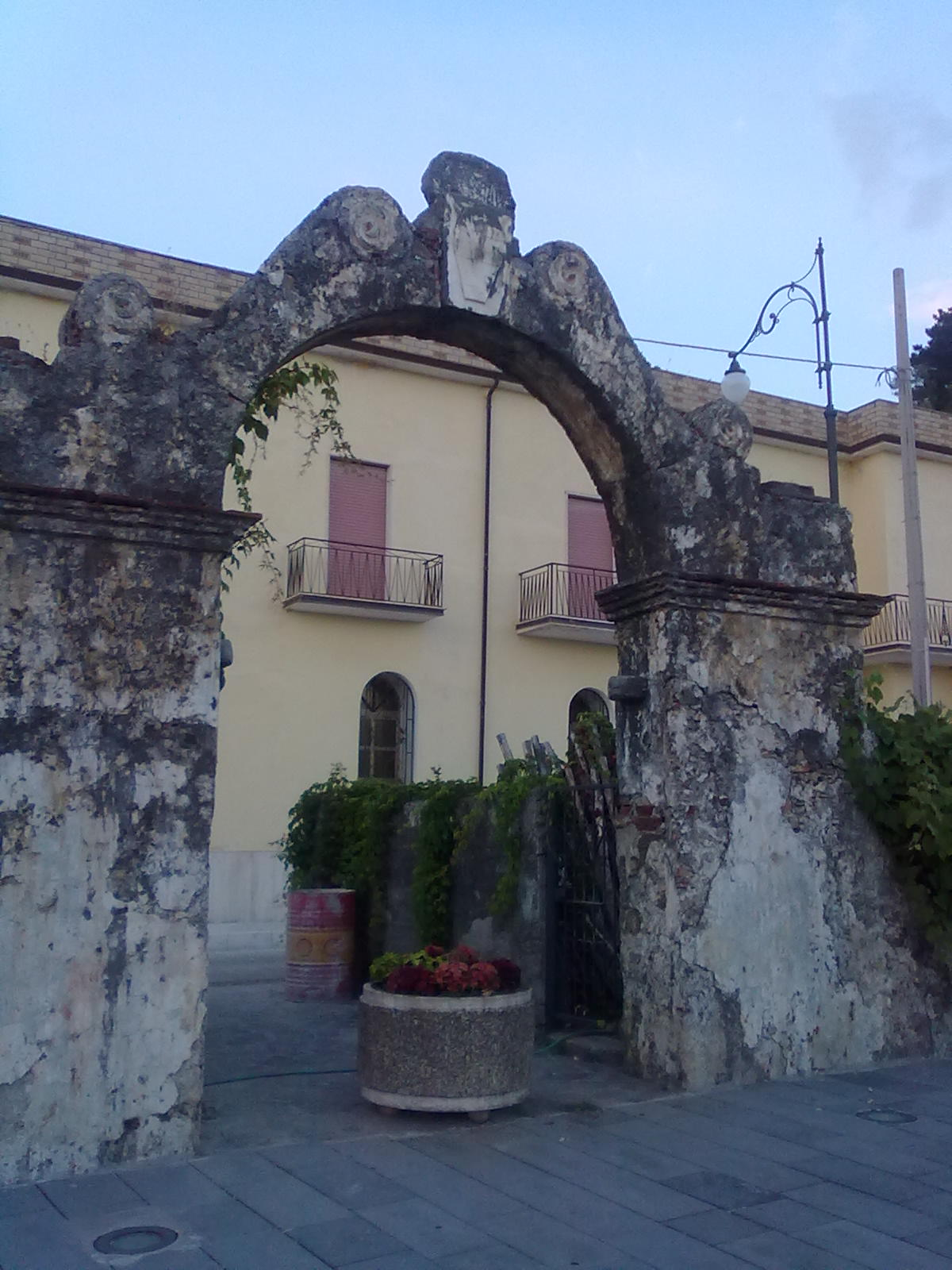
Old gate of Carafa Palace.

== See also ==
- Cilentan dialect
- Cilento and Vallo di Diano National Park
