= Punta del Fortino Lighthouse =

Punta del Fortino lighthouse
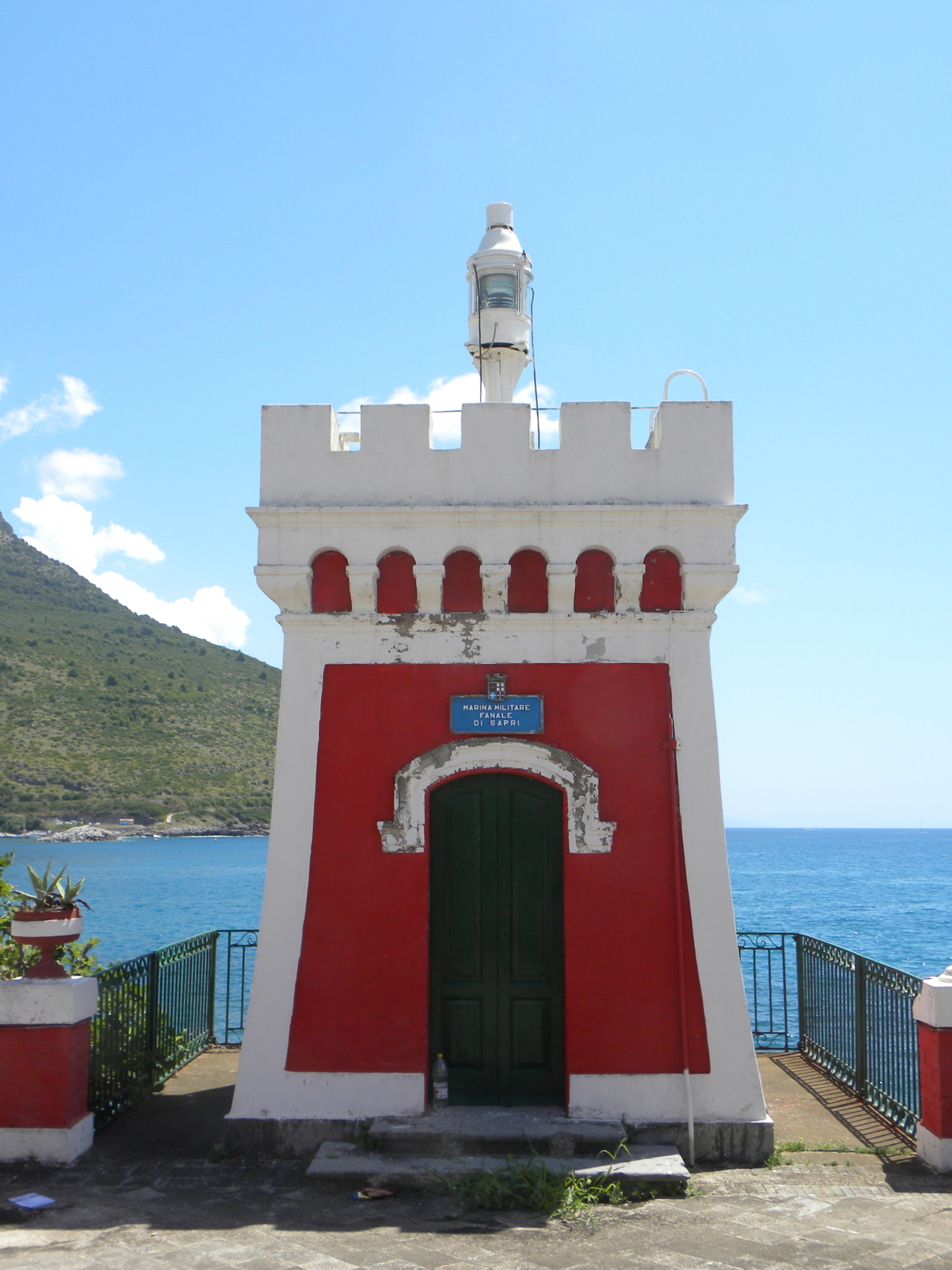
- Location: Sapri; Campania; Italy
- Coordinates: 40°04′09″N 15°37′07″E

Tower
- Constructed: 1915
- Foundation: concrete base
- Construction: masonry tower
- Height: 4 metres (13 ft)
- Shape: quadrangular tower with balcony and lantern on a short post
- Markings: red tower with white trim, white lantern
- Power source: solar power
- Operator: Marina Militare

Light
- Focal height: 13 metres (43 ft)
- Lens: Type TD
- Intensity: LABI 100 W
- Range: 7 nautical miles (13 km; 8.1 mi)
- Characteristic: Fl (2) W 7s.
- Italy no.: 2676 E.F.

Punta del Fortino Lighthouse (Italian: Faro di Punta del Fortino) is an active lighthouse located at the end of the south western point of the Bay of Sapri, Campania on the Tyrrhenian Sea.

== Description ==
The lighthouse, built in 1915, consists of a 1-storey red masonry quadrangular tower, 4 feet (1.2 m) high, with embattled balcony and lantern. The lantern is placed on a post atop the tower, it is positioned at 65 metres (213 ft) above sea level and emits two white flashes in a 7 seconds period, visible up to a distance of 7 nautical miles (13 km; 8.1 mi). The lighthouse is completely automated and operated by the Marina Militare with the identification code number 2676 E.F.

== See also ==
- List of lighthouses in Italy
- Sapri
