= Angelo Accardi =

Italian visual artist

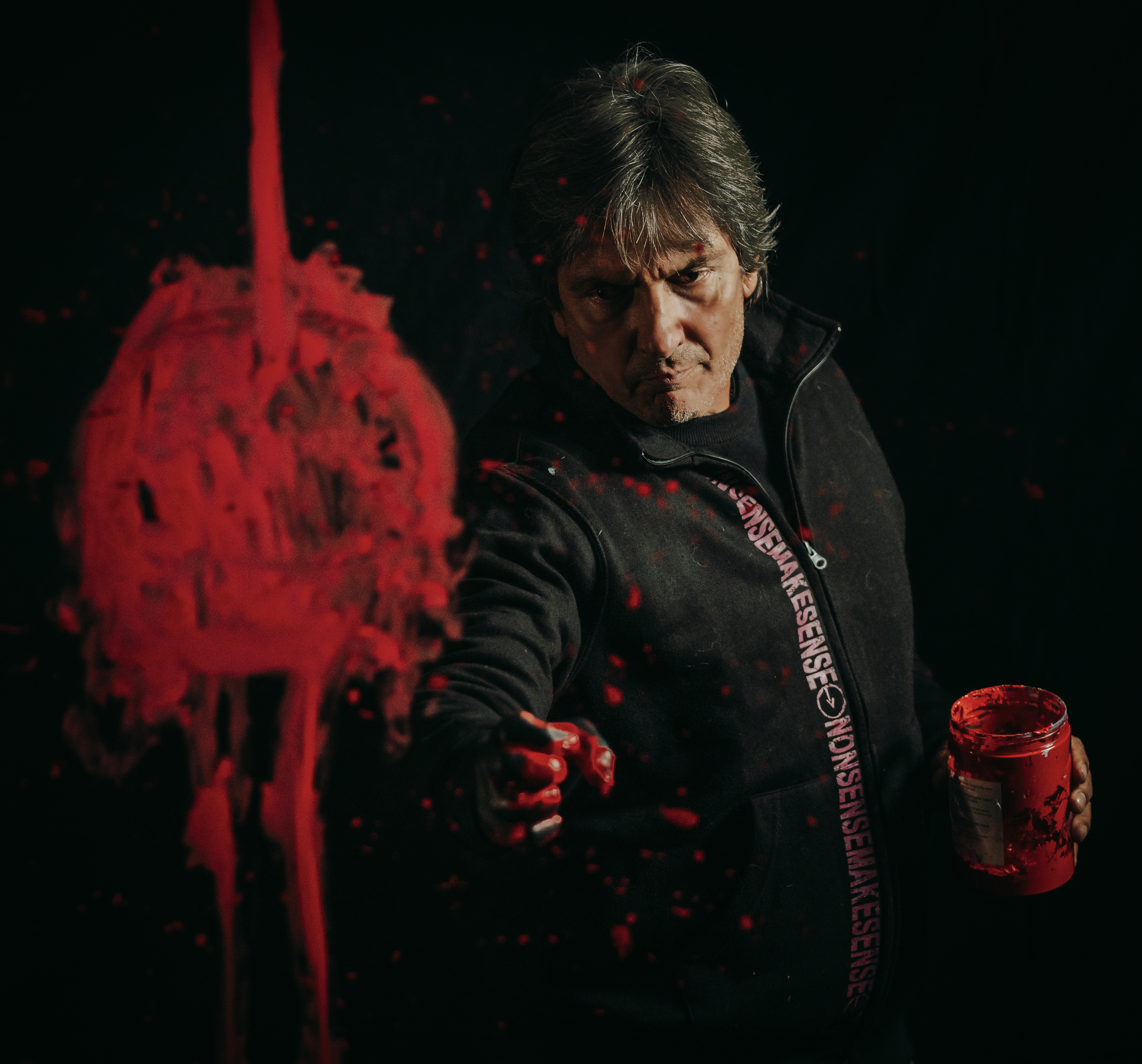
- Born: 1964 (age 61–62); Sapri, Campania
- Occupation: Artist
- Known for: Painting, sculpture
- Notable work: Misplaced series Blend; Human Collection; Poetry (Fuck) public sculpture
- Website: angeloaccardi.com

Angelo Accardi (born 1964) is an Italian painter and sculptor associated with the pop surrealism movement. He is best known for his Misplaced series.

== Early life and education ==
Accardi was born in 1964 in Sapri, in the Province of Salerno, Campania, Italy. He moved to Naples to study at the Academy of Fine Arts (Accademia di Belle Arti di Napoli), but interrupted his studies after a short time and did not complete his formal education.

== Career ==
After leaving the academy, Accardi went through an artistic identity crisis that led him toward abstraction. By the end of the 1980s he had turned to marble sculpture, drawing inspiration from Greek and Roman classics. In the early 1990s, he opened a personal studio in Sapri and began producing paintings with social themes, originating the cycle of works known as the Human Collection. During this period, he exhibited at Italian and European galleries including Rossetti e Pini in Rome, Manzoni Art Studio in Milan and Klaus Lea Gallery in Munich. In 2006, Accardi joined the avant-garde group TantArte and exhibited in Shanghai.

In 2011, his work was recognized by art historian Marco Vallora, who selected him for inclusion in the 54th Venice Biennale.

In 2018, Accardi's work, Misplaced, was exhibited at Eden Fine Art Mayfair in London.

Accardi's works are distributed internationally by Eden Gallery and since 2021, he has been working with the Deodato Art Gallery in Italy. In 2022, his work, Nonsense Makes Sense, was exhibited at the Deodato Art Gallery.

== Work ==
Accardi's artistic style is characterized by a blend of surreal and realistic elements, focusing on narrative and multiple interpretations. His paintings often incorporate elements from artists such as Klimt, Picasso, and Roy Lichtenstein. These classical references are juxtaposed with figures from contemporary popular culture, including characters from Minions and Matt Groening's The Simpsons.

In his early career, Accardi's work was influenced by what he refers to as the Italian "figura" tradition, emphasizing the human form, along with pictorial and symbolic elements. His collections such as Human Collection, Misplaced, and Blend reflect his interest in the interaction between humans, space, and society.
