= Ispani =

- Comune
- Comune di Ispani
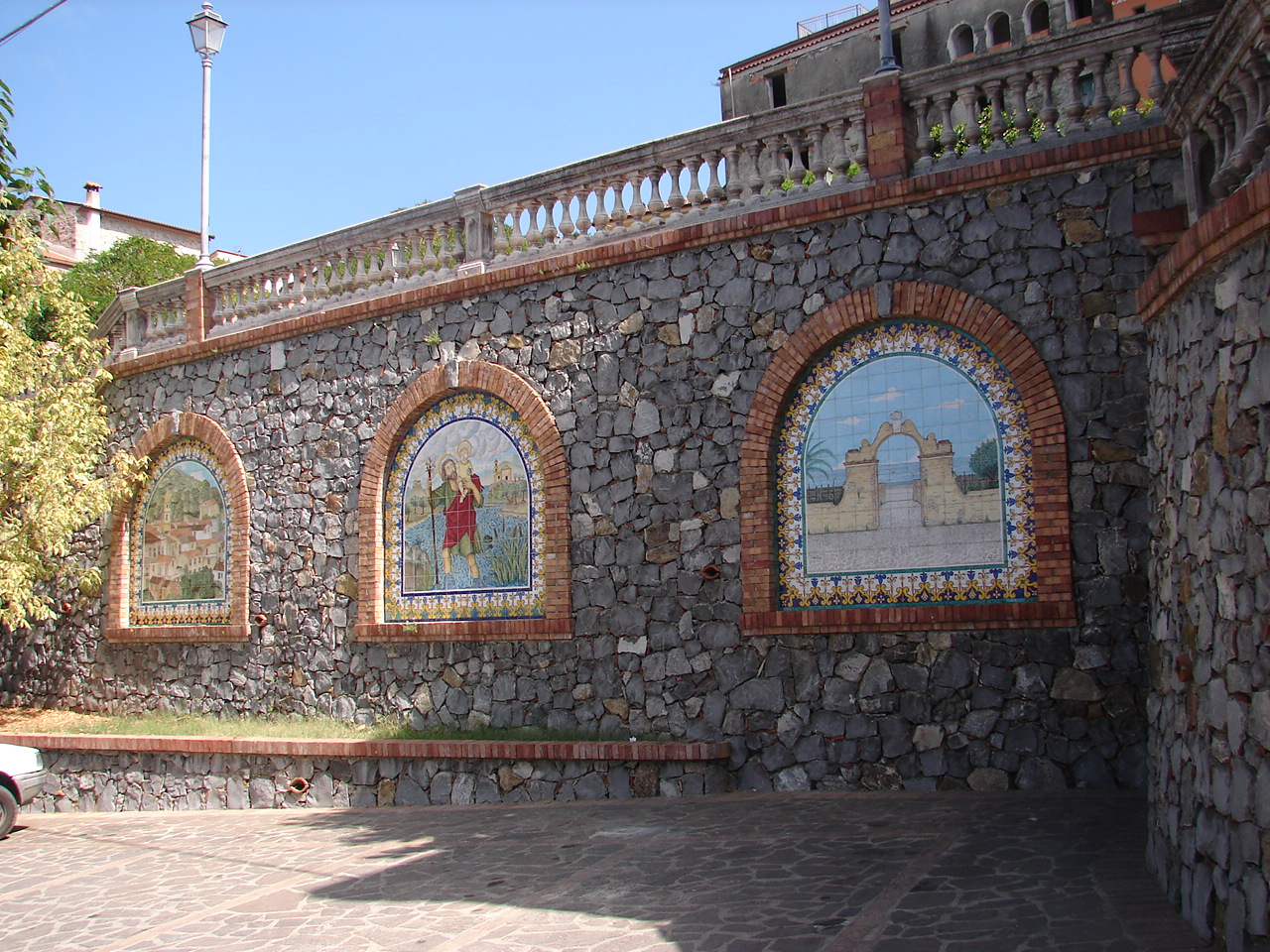

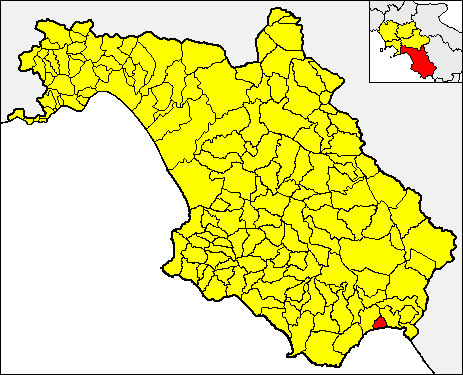
- Ispani within the Province of Salerno

- Location within Italy Location within Campania
- Coordinates: 40°05′16.4″N 15°33′28.44″E
- Country: Italy
- Region: Campania
- Province: Salerno (SA)
- Frazioni: Capitello, San Cristoforo

Government
  - Mayor: Francesco Giudice

Area
  - Total: 8.34 km^{2} (3.22 sq mi)
- Elevation: 256 m (840 ft)

Population (31 October 2017)
  - Total: 988
  - Density: 118/km^{2} (307/sq mi)
- Demonym: Ispanoti
- Time zone: UTC+1 (CET)
  - Summer (DST): UTC+2 (CEST)
- Postal code: 84050, 84040
- Dialing code: 0973
- Patron saint: St. Nicholas
- Website: Official website

Ispani is a town and comune in the province of Salerno in the Campania region of south-western Italy.

== Geography ==
Located in southern Cilento, Ispani is a hilltown nearby the Cilentan Coast, few km far from Sapri, Policastro and Villammare. The municipality borders with Santa Marina and Vibonati and counts two hamlets (frazioni): Capitello, by the sea, and San Cristoforo on the hill.

== History ==
The first documented traces of populations in the municipal territory date back to the Norman period of southern Italy, after King Roger I built here a castle (now largely disappeared) in 1055. The presence of the Aragonese with a lookout tower dates back to the second half of the 16th century, built to prevent the assaults of the Saracen pirates, like the others built by Gaeta in Reggio Calabria.

To escape from pirate raids and malaria, the population periodically withdrew towards the hinterland, climbing along the steep hills where today the towns of Ispani and San Cristoforo rise.

In the sixteenth century the Counts Carafa della Spina, fleeing from the nearby Malicastro-infested Policastro, settled in the village of Capitello.

The name of Ispani appears in a document of the viceroyal period which concerns an annotation of the Royal Chamber of Naples on the looting carried out by the pirate Dragut Pasha. The barbaresco corsair, after having sacked the nearby Policastro, set fire to and destroyed the village of Ispani which on 26 November 1557 had a hundred inhabitants; only twenty survived. In the Census of the Kingdom of Naples Ispani appears in 1595 with only 40 inhabitants, then in 1614 with 70 inhabitants and in 1660 with 50 inhabitants. In 1790 there were 671 inhabitants.

With the advent of the Kingdom of Italy it was confirmed capital of the municipality and only during the fascist period, with the merger of the municipalities of Ispani and Santa Marina, was the seat of the Municipality of Policastro. The three towns of Ispani, Capitello and San Cristoforo are united in a single administrative entity since the birth of the Italian Republic.

== Culture and events ==
Patron of Ispani is San Nicola di Bari, whose anniversary is celebrated on 6 December. The main festival of the country is 16 August in honor of San Rocco.

The patron saint of Capitello is S. Antonio, in whose honor a procession is prepared on 13 June with the blessing of homemade bread.

The patron of San Cristoforo is S. Cristoforo, celebrated on 25 July; on this occasion the traditional blessing of the vehicles is carried out.

In August in San Cristoforo the "Sagra della Cuccìa" is set up, with the tasting of the Cuccìa, a typical Cilento dish made with legumes cooked separately and then served with a slice of bread, whose preparation requires several hours. On this occasion, a procession of girls dressed in traditional country clothes is also set up.

== See also ==
- Cilentan dialect
- Cilento and Vallo di Diano National Park
