= Vibonati =

- Comune
- Comune di Vibonati
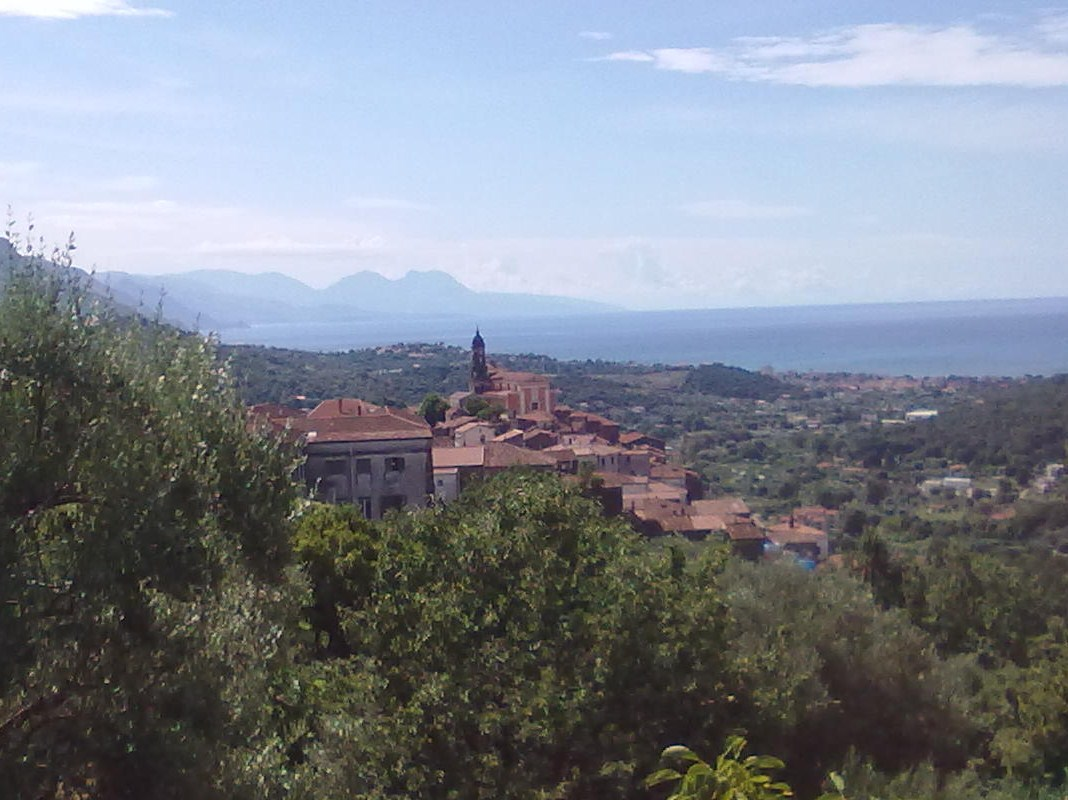

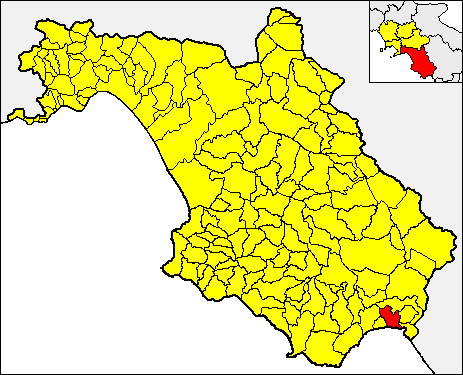
- Vibonati within the Province of Salerno

- Location within Italy Location within Campania
- Coordinates: 40°5′58.34″N 15°34′58.87″E
- Country: Italy
- Region: Campania
- Province: Salerno (SA)
- Frazioni: Villammare

Government
  - Mayor: Francesco Brusco

Area
  - Total: 20.54 km^{2} (7.93 sq mi)
- Elevation: 110 m (360 ft)

Population (28 February 2017)
  - Total: 3,344
  - Density: 162.8/km^{2} (421.7/sq mi)
- Demonym: Vibonatesi
- Time zone: UTC+1 (CET)
  - Summer (DST): UTC+2 (CEST)
- Postal code: 84079
- Dialing code: 0973
- Patron saint: St. Antonio Abate
- Saint day: January 17
- Website: Official website

Vibonati (Cilentan: Livunati) is a town and comune in the province of Salerno in the Campania region of south-western Italy.

== Geography ==
Located in southern Cilento, Vibonati is a hilltown nearby the Cilentan Coast, few km far from Sapri, Capitello and Policastro. The municipality borders with Casaletto Spartano, Ispani, Santa Marina, Sapri, Torraca and Tortorella. It as a single hamlet, (frazione), the coastal village of Villammare.

== See also ==
- Cilentan dialect
- Cilento and Vallo di Diano National Park
