= Gulf of Policastro =

Gulf in southern Italy

Coordinates: 39°58′N 15°37′E

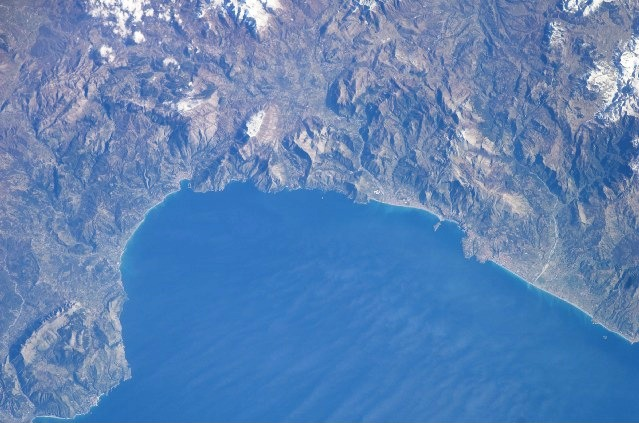
The gulf of Policastro seen from space

The Gulf of Policastro is an inlet of the Tyrrhenian Sea which bathes the coasts of three provinces: Salerno in Campania, Potenza in Basilicata and Cosenza in Calabria. The western limit of the gulf is the tip of Infreschi in the municipality of Camerota in Cilento, the south-eastern one is Capo Scalea, near the homonymous town.

== Description ==
In ancient times it was called Sinus Laus, from the polis of Magna Grecia Laos, located, however, in Santa Maria al Cedro, beyond the Gulf of Policastro. Today the gulf takes its name from the town of Policastro Bussentino (now part of the municipality of Santa Marina), the ancient Pixous of Magna Grecia and later known as Buxentum in Roman times.

The entire Tyrrhenian coast of Basilicata overlooks the Gulf of Policastro, dominated to the north by the Massiccio del Sirino. The main municipalities are Sapri (SA) in Campania, Maratea (PZ) in Basilicata, Praia a Mare and Scalea (CS) in Calabria. The Campania section of the gulf falls partly within the Cilento and Vallo di Diano National Park.
