= Santa Marina, Campania =

Santa Marina
- Comune
- Comune di Santa Marina
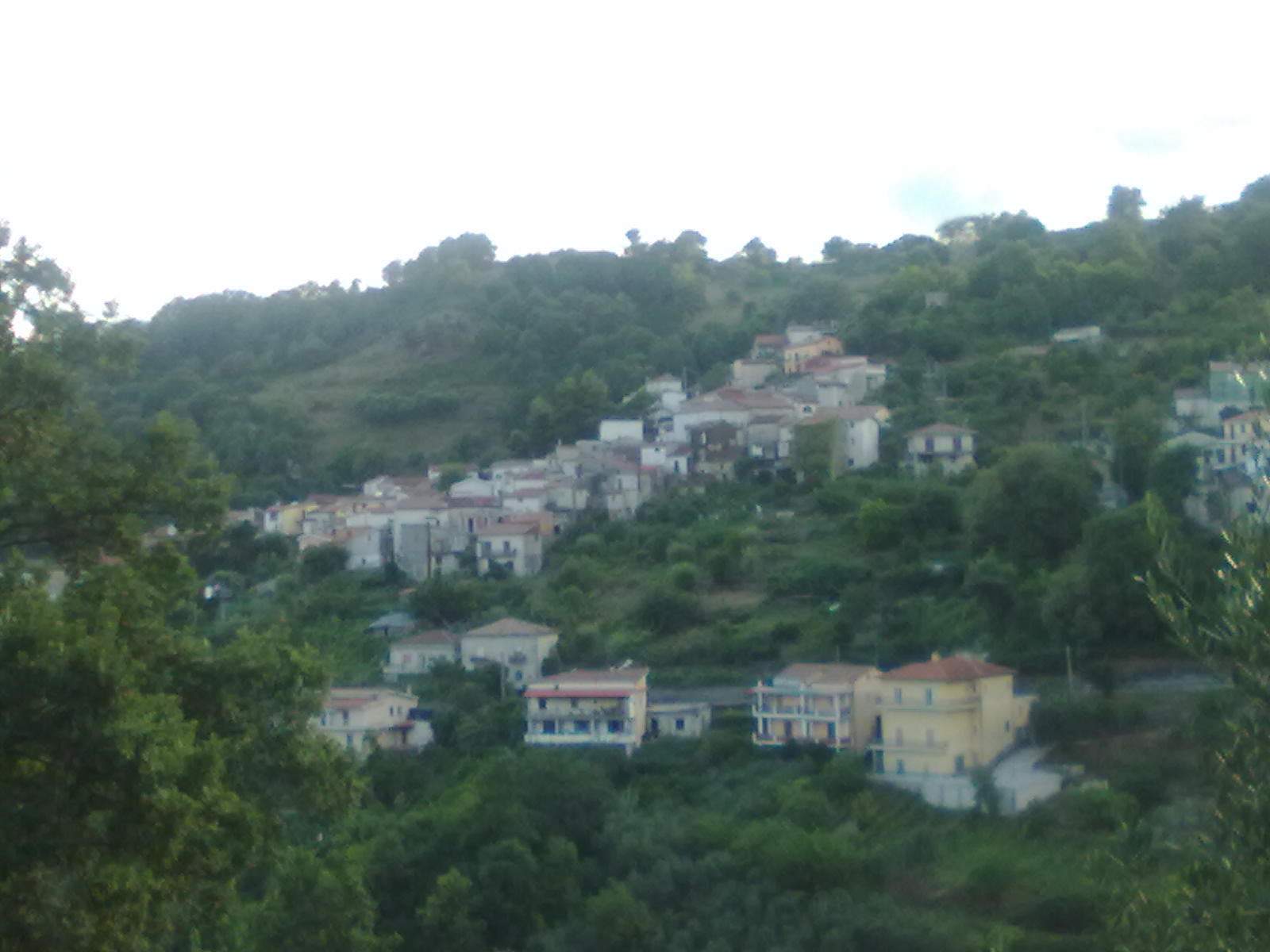

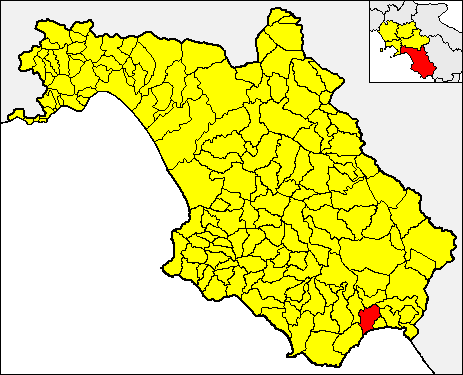
- Santa Marina within the Province of Salerno

- Location within Italy Location within Campania
- Coordinates: 40°6′19.91″N 15°32′28.9″E
- Country: Italy
- Region: Campania
- Province: Salerno (SA)
- Frazioni: Lupinata, Policastro Bussentino, Poria

Government
  - Mayor: Giovanni Fortunato

Area
  - Total: 28.36 km^{2} (10.95 sq mi)
- Elevation: 415 m (1,362 ft)

Population (28 February 2017)
  - Total: 3,239
  - Density: 114.2/km^{2} (295.8/sq mi)
- Demonym: Santamarinesi
- Time zone: UTC+1 (CET)
  - Summer (DST): UTC+2 (CEST)
- Postal code: 84070
- Dialing code: 0974
- Patron saint: St. Marina
- Saint day: 18 June
- Website: Official website

Santa Marina is a town and comune in the province of Salerno in the Campania region of south-western Italy.

== Geography ==
The municipality, located in southern Cilento, borders with Ispani, Morigerati, San Giovanni a Piro, Torre Orsaia, Tortorella and Vibonati.

Santa Marina counts 3 hamlets (frazioni): Lupinata, Policastro Bussentino and Poria. Policastro is the most populated municipal settlement and a sea resort.

== See also ==
- Cilento
- Cilentan Coast
