= Policastro Bussentino =

Town in Campania, Italy

- Frazione
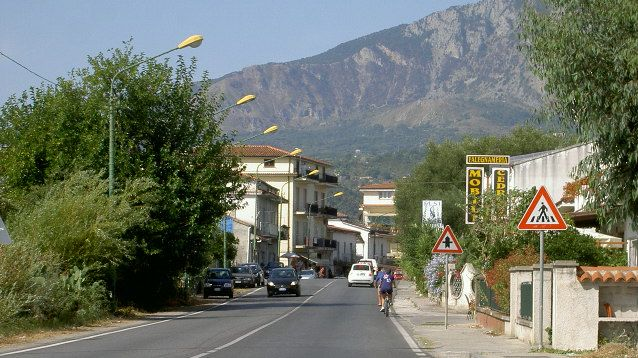

- Location of Policastro Bussentino in Italy
- Coordinates: 40°04′00″N 15°31′00″E
- Country: Italy
- Region: Campania
- Province: Salerno (SA)
- Comune: Santa Marina
- Elevation: 4 m (13 ft)

Population 2011
  - Total: 1,625
- Demonym: Policastresi
- Time zone: UTC+1 (CET)
  - Summer (DST): UTC+2 (CEST)
- Postal code: 84067
- Dialing code: (+39) 0974

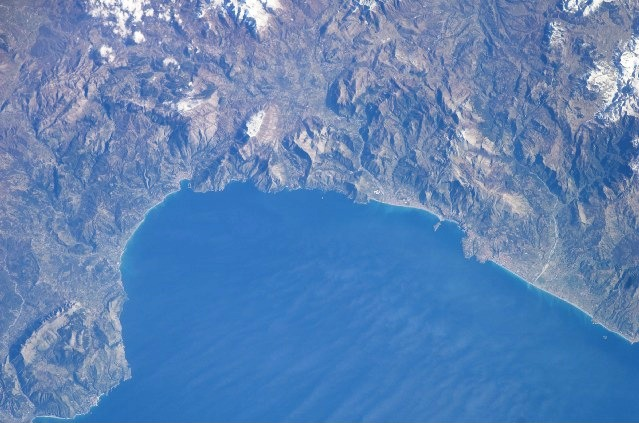
Gulf of Policastro.

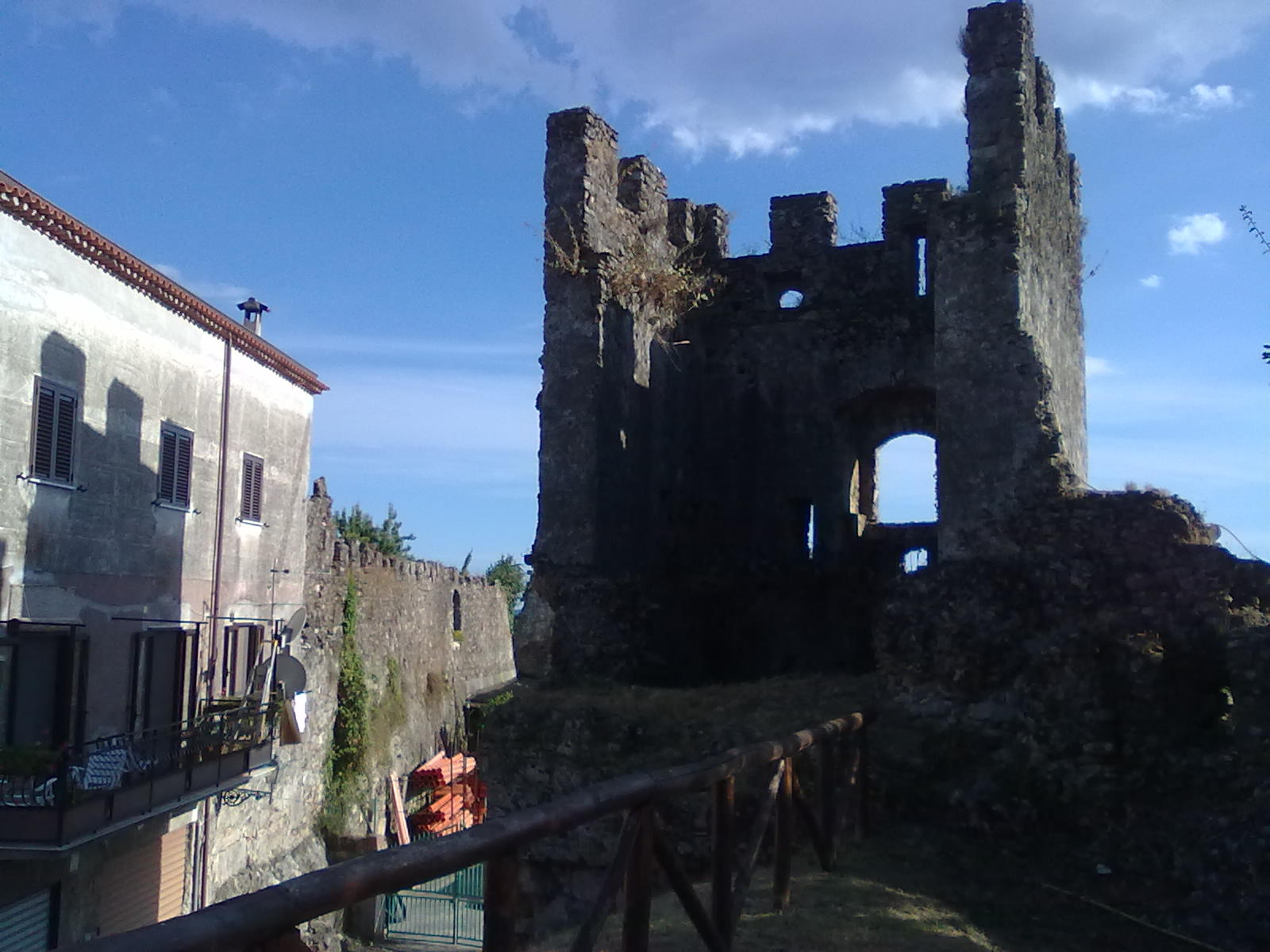
Defensive walls.

Policastro Bussentino (or simply Policastro) is an Italian town and hamlet (frazione) of the municipality of Santa Marina (of which it is its seat) in the province of Salerno, Campania region. It is a former bishopric, now titular see, and has a population of 1,625.

== History ==
The town was founded in Magna Graecia in 470 or 471 BC as Pyxus or Pixous (Ancient Greek: Πυξοῦς), by Micythus (Ancient Greek: Μίκυθος), the tyrant of Rhegion and Messena. It has been a Latin Rite bishopric twice, as Bussento (Latin: Buxentum) and as Policastro, and remains a Catholic titular see as "Capo della Foresta".

During the fascist period, with the union of municipalities of Ispani and Santa Marina, Policastro became a hamlet of Capitello.

== Geography ==
The town is located on the southern side of Cilento, not too far from the national park, in the middle of the Gulf of Policastro on the Tyrrhenian Sea. Situated by the estuary of river Bussento, it is 10 km far (north) from Sapri, 5 from Santa Marina, 4 from Scario (hamlet of San Giovanni a Piro), 25 from Marina di Camerota (hamlet of Camerota), and almost 90 from Salerno. The nearest villages by the sea are Capitello (hamlet of Ispani, far 2 km) and Villammare (hamlet of Vibonati, far 4 km).

== Tourism ==
Policastro attracts visitors, especially in summer, due to the quality of its water, its rural surroundings and a good rail link and for camping.

== Transport ==
The railway station is situated in the middle of the town, by the main line Rome-Naples-Reggio Calabria-Palermo/Catania. Regional trains run every hour. The town recently inaugurated (2006) as the final track of national road SS18, which runs from Salerno - Battipaglia - Paestum - Agropoli - Vallo della Lucania - Palinuro to Sapri. Policastro has another carriageway, a variation of SS 517 that reaches Padula and the A2 Motorway exit Padula-Buonabitacolo, via Sanza.

== See also ==
- Cilento
- Cilento and Vallo di Diano National Park
- Roman Catholic Diocese of Policastro
- Roman Catholic Diocese of Teggiano-Policastro
- List of ancient Greek cities
- Magna Graecia
- Santa Marina
