= Sapri =

- Comune
- Comune di Sapri
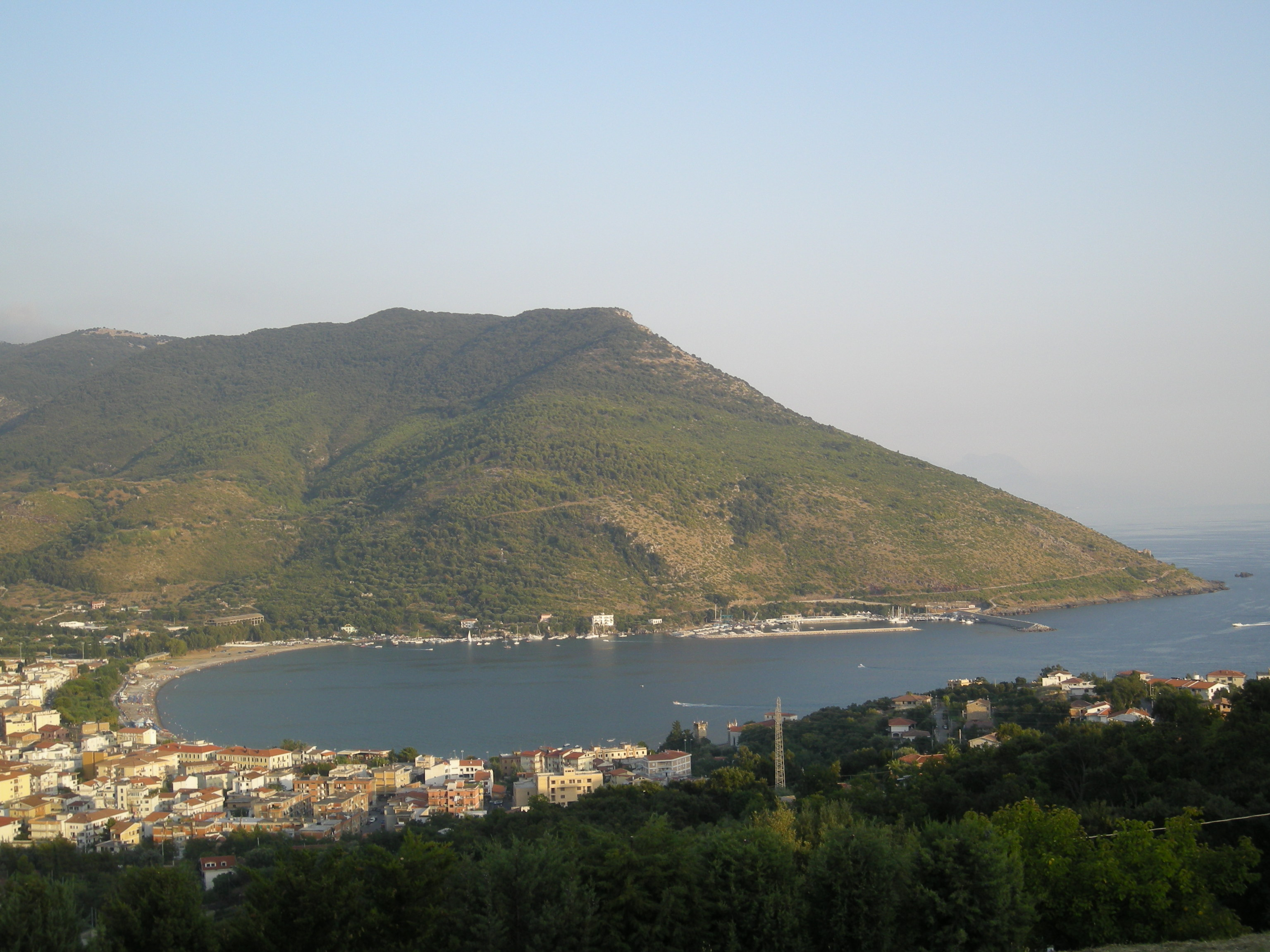
- Sapri's bay

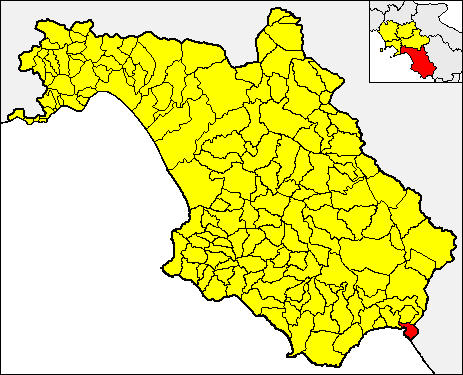
- Sapri within the Province of Salerno

- Location within Italy Location within Campania
- Coordinates: 40°4′N 15°38′E
- Country: Italy
- Region: Campania
- Province: Salerno (SA)
- Frazioni: Timpone

Government
  - Mayor: Antonio Gentile

Area
  - Total: 13 km^{2} (5.0 sq mi)
- Elevation: 5 m (16 ft)

Population (31 December 2015)
  - Total: 6,783
  - Density: 520/km^{2} (1,400/sq mi)
- Demonym: Sapresi
- Time zone: UTC+1 (CET)
  - Summer (DST): UTC+2 (CEST)
- Postal code: 84073
- Dialing code: 0973
- Patron saint: St. Vito
- Saint day: June 15
- Website: Official website

Sapri is a town and comune in the province of Salerno in the Campania region of south-western Italy. It is one of the southernmost towns of the region of Cilento and its population is 6,783.

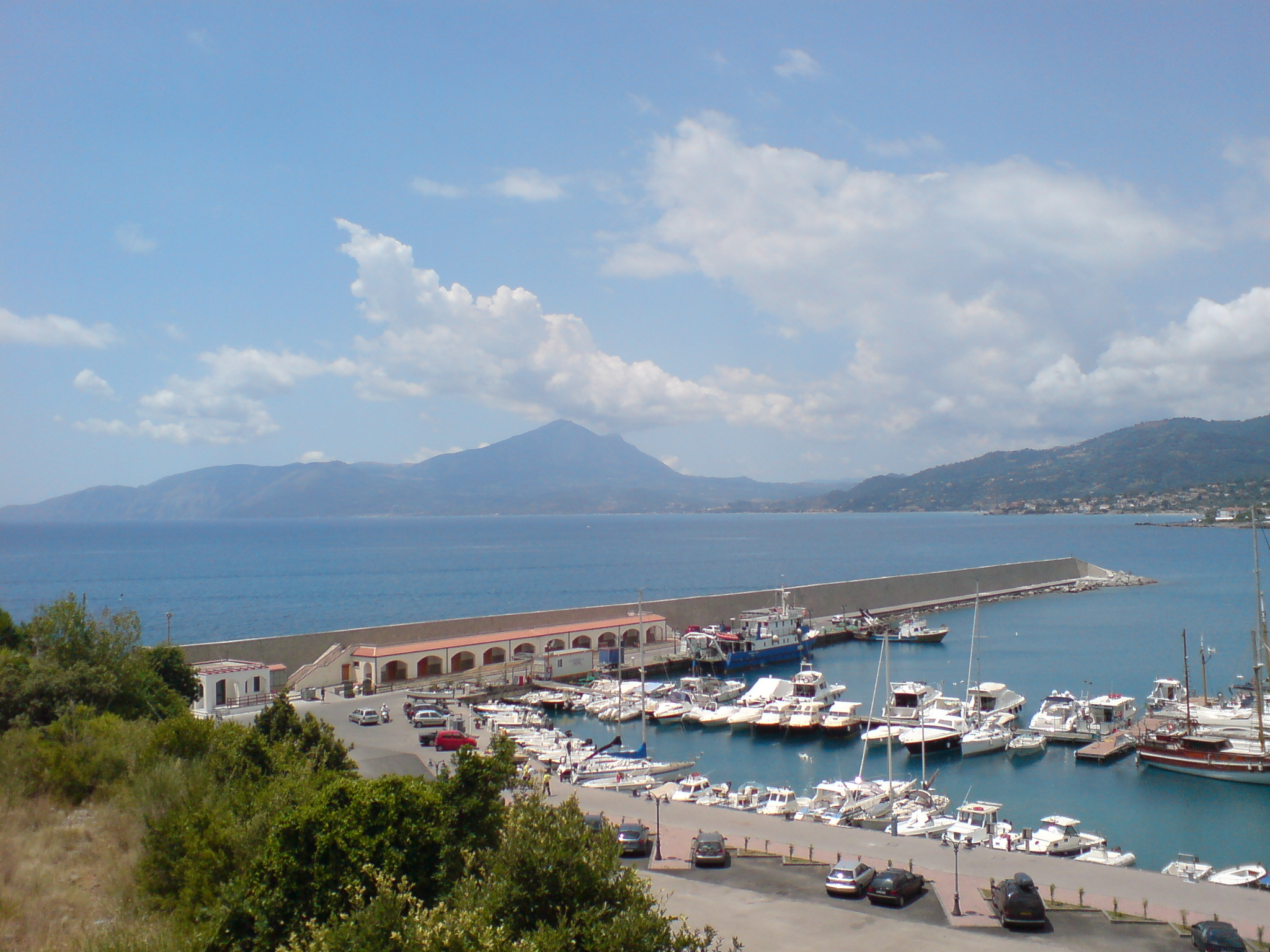
Port.

== History ==
The town of Sapri has ancient origins and is considered the heart of the Gulf of Policastro. Its origins can be traced back to the times of Magna Graecia, when it was founded by ancient Greeks of Sybaris, under the name of "Scidrus" (Ancient Greek: Σκίδρος). During the Roman era, the bay and its hinterland were highly esteemed. Cicero referred to it as parva gemma maris inferi ("a small gem of the southern sea"). To this day, there are remains of Roman buildings near La Specola, along the road leading to Vibonati.

From 1811 to 1860, Sapri was part of the circondario of Vibonati, which belonged to the District of Sala in the Kingdom of the Two Sicilies.

In June–July 1857 the republican revolutionary Carlo Pisacane led the Sapri expedition here. Pisacane and about 300 of his companions were killed in the suppression of the expedition.

== Geography ==
The town is a port on Tyrrhenian Sea, located in the southern part of Campania, close to the border with Basilicata. The town is 10 km from Maratea, 8 km from Policastro Bussentino and almost 100 km from Salerno.

== Notable people ==
- Angelo Accardi, born in Sapri, Italian artist

== Twin towns ==
- Ripatransone, Italy

== See also ==
- Cilento
- Sapri Calcio
- Cilentan Coast
- La Spigolatrice
- Sapri railway station
- Punta del Fortino Lighthouse
