= Sicilì =

- Frazione
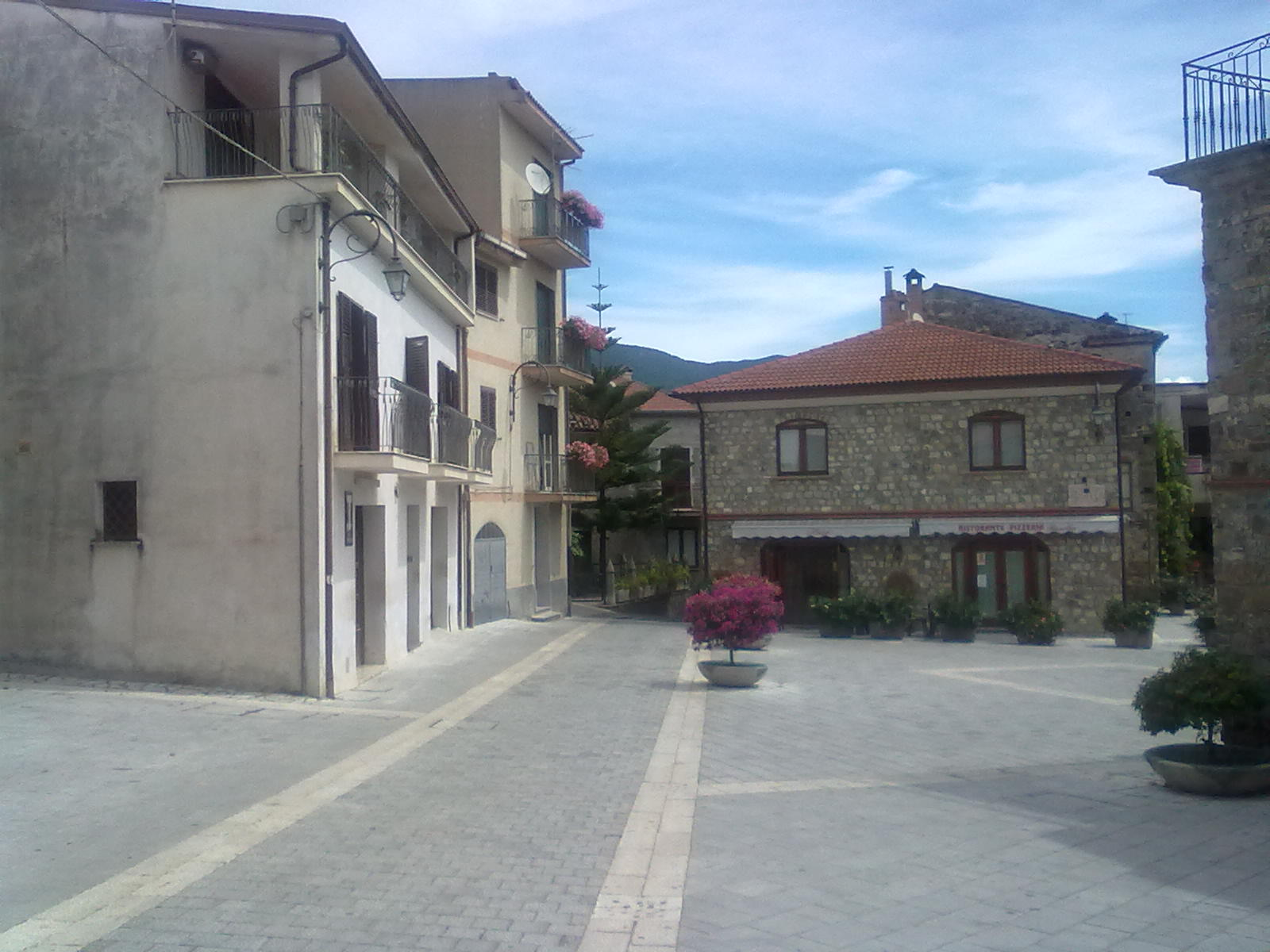
- A village's square

- Location of Sicilì in Italy
- Coordinates: 40°08′11.3″N 15°31′50.0″E
- Country: Italy
- Region: Campania
- Province: Salerno (SA)
- Comune: Morigerati
- Elevation: 205 m (673 ft)

Population (2011)
  - Total: 364
- Demonym: Sicilesi
- Time zone: UTC+1 (CET)
  - Summer (DST): UTC+2 (CEST)
- Postal code: 84030
- Dialing code: (+39) 0974
- Patron saint: St. Blaise
- Saint day: 3 February and 14 May

Sicilì is a southern Italian village and hamlet (frazione) of Morigerati, a municipality in the province of Salerno, Campania. As of 2011, it had a population of 364.

== History ==
The village was first mentioned in 1521, however, the origins of the village are unknown. It was named after Sicily, in honor of a Sicilian farmer who used the surrounding rural areas for pastoralism as well as the Sicilians who would settle the area soon after. According to local tradition, The farmer, who supposedly owned many animals, brought them to the site that would become the village and left them there. From Scario, he sailed back to Sicily and upon arrival, was advised to send many Sicilian families to take care of the animals. The locals are believed to be descended from these Sicilian settlers.

== Geography ==
Sicilì is a hill village located in southern Cilento, next to the Bussento river and its caves, a WWF oasis. It is 3 km from Morigerati, 8 from Caselle in Pittari and Santa Marina, 13 from Torre Orsaia, 14 from Castel Ruggero, and 14 from Policastro, by the Tyrrhenian Coast.

== Transport ==
The village is served by the national highway SS 517/var Padula-Policastro at the exit "Sicilì-Morigerati", 3 km west. The highway links the Cilentan highway to the A3 Motorway. Nearest railway station, Torre Orsaia, is 17 km southwest.

== See also ==
- Cilentan dialect
- Cilento and Vallo di Diano National Park
