= Bussento =

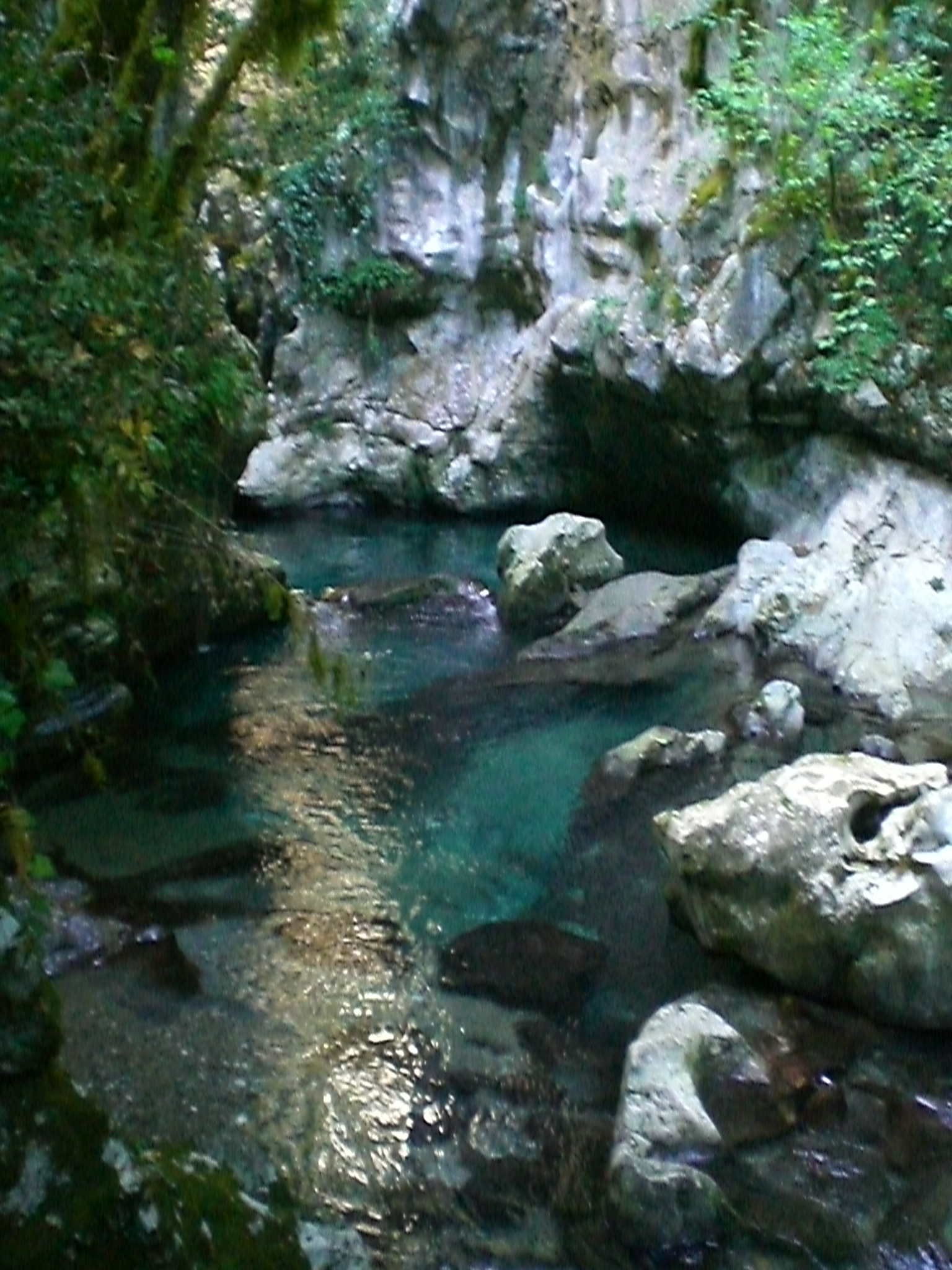
- Bussento near Morigerati

Location
- Country: Italy

Physical characteristics
- Source
  - location: Cervati mountain, Sanza
  - coordinates: 40°19′10″N 15°13′58″E
  - elevation: 900 m (3,000 ft)
- Mouth: Tyrrhenian Sea
  - location: Gulf of Policastro, Policastro Bussentino
  - coordinates: 40°03′56″N 15°30′37″E
- Length: 37 km (23 mi)

The Bussento is a river in southwestern Italy. Originating from Cervati mountain, it flows in the Campanian territory of Cilento, in the Province of Salerno. Its mouth is by the Tyrrhenian Sea, near Policastro Bussentino.

== Geography ==
After its origin in Cervati, it flows south of Sanza, crosses Sant'Eliano, nearby the artificial Lake Sabetta (fed by the river), and Caselle in Pittari. After Caselle, it flows under the Pannello mountain, and emerges in Morigerati, next to its municipal borders with Tortorella. After it, the Bussento marks Morigerati's border with Santa Marina, flows south of Sicilì, crosses the municipal borders of Torre Orsaia until its railway station in Calleo and, after, it flows near the localities of Hangar, Santa Lucia and Crocefisso. Its mouth, on the Gulf of Policastro, by the Tyrrhenian Sea, is 700 m west of Policastro Bussentino, near Torre Oliva, and 2.4 km east of Scario.

The main tributary of Bussento is the Bussentino, a creek that flows through Casaletto Spartano, Battaglia, Tortorella, and joins the river in Morigerati, near the Bussento Caves.

== Natural environment ==
The Caves of Bussento, located in Morigerati, are a WWF Oasis. It is a nature reserve that includes gorges and caves along the river.

== Gallery ==
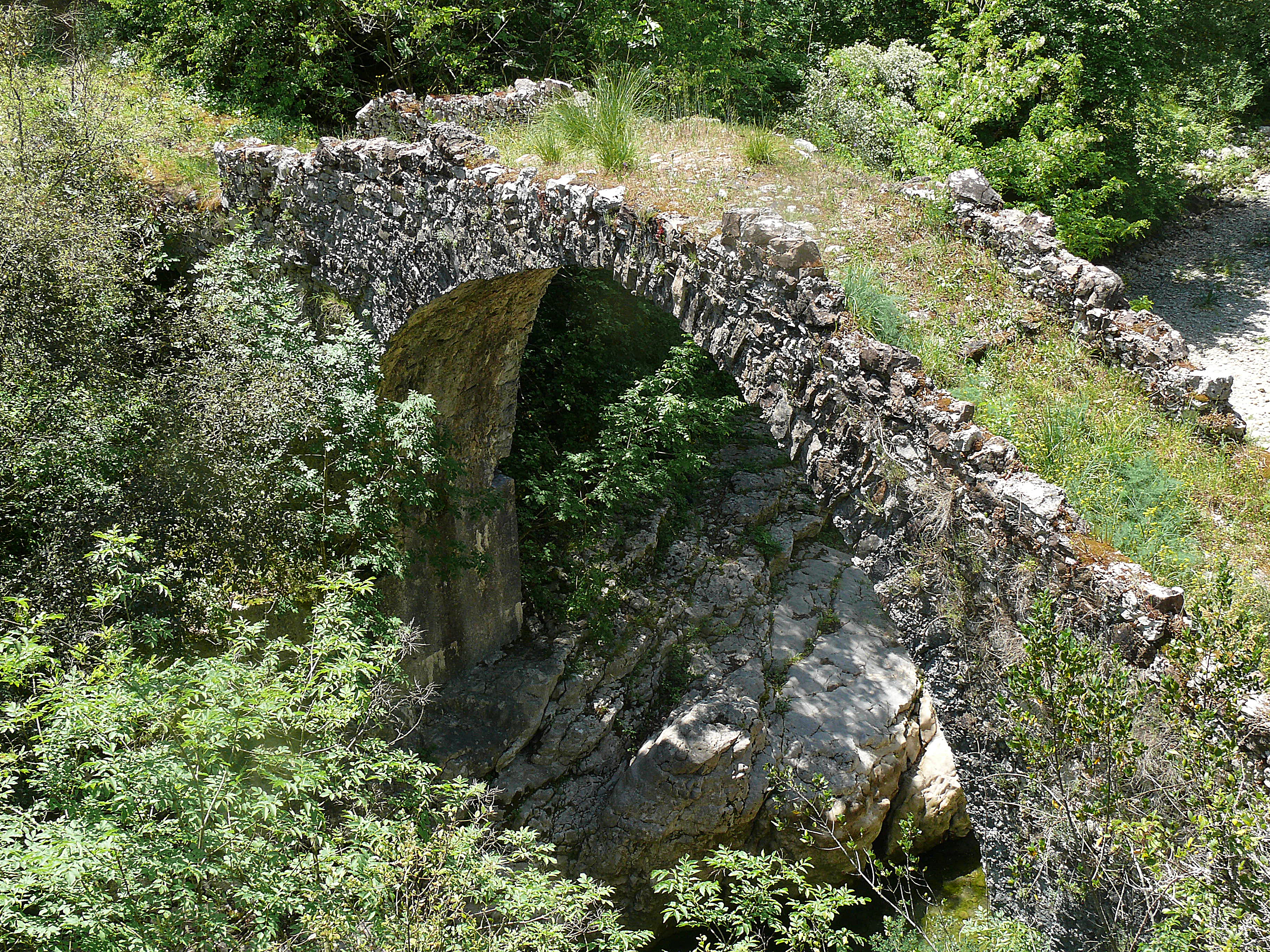
Ancient bridge over the river

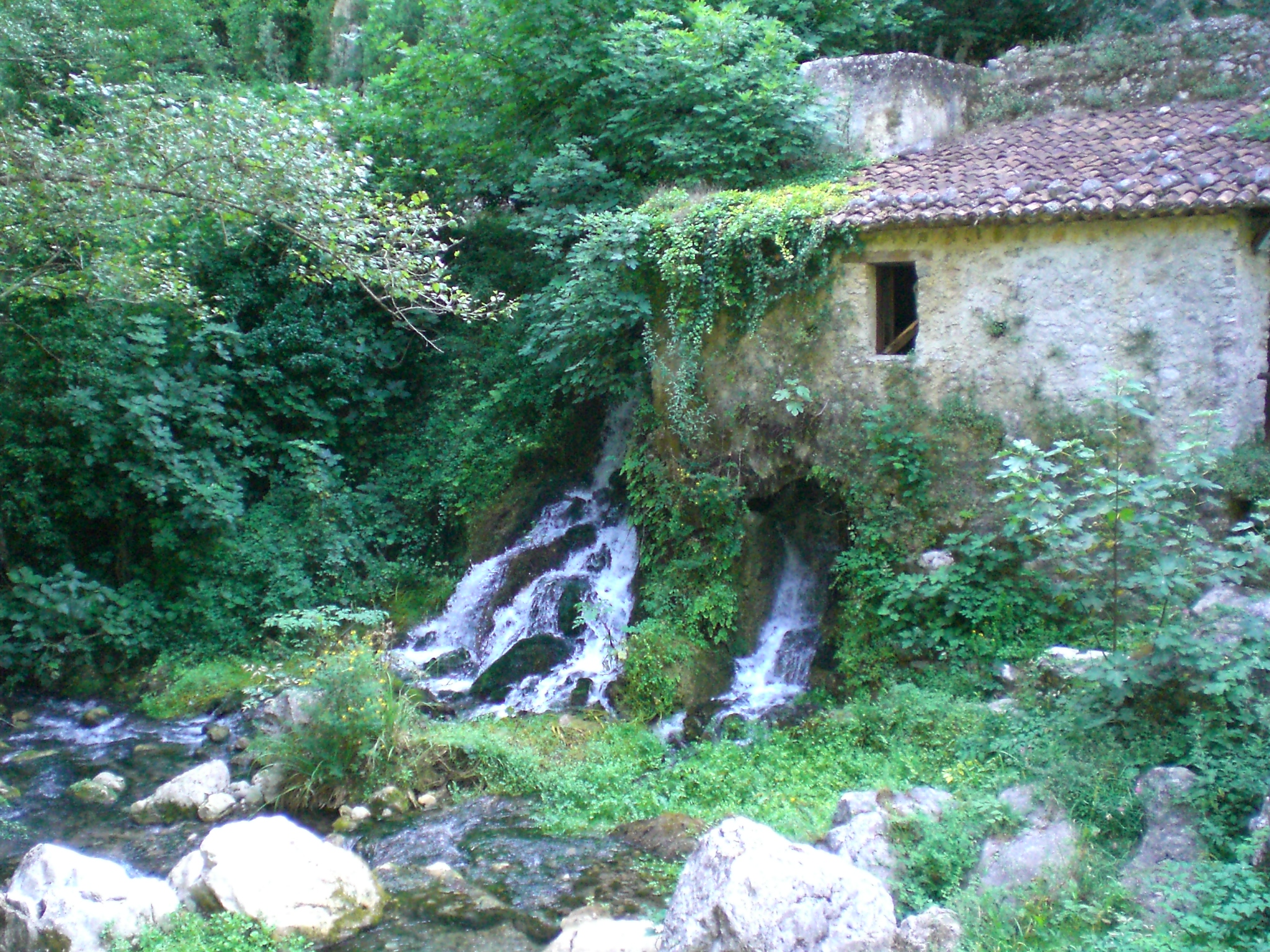
An old mill near Morigerati

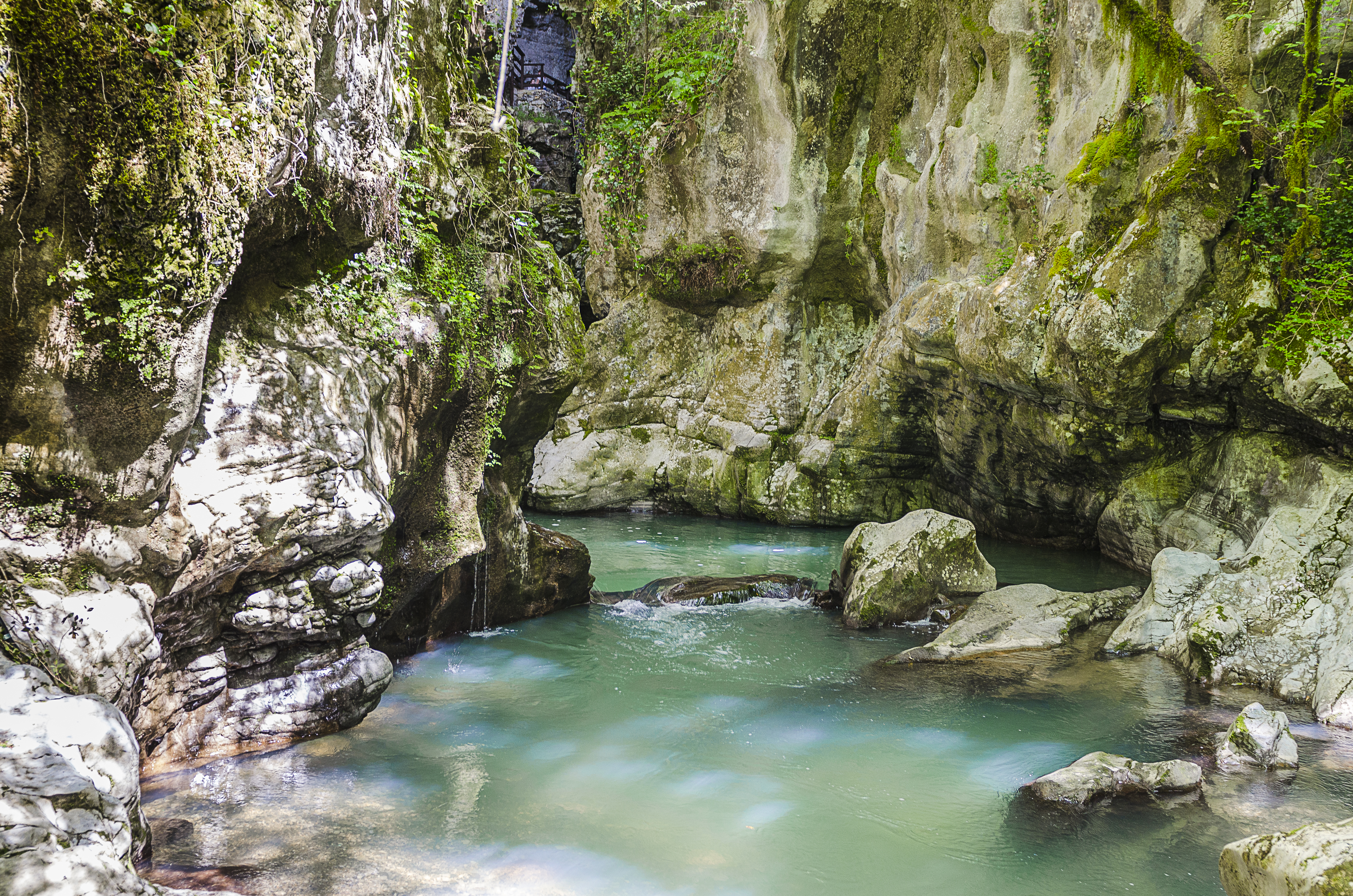
The gorges near the caves

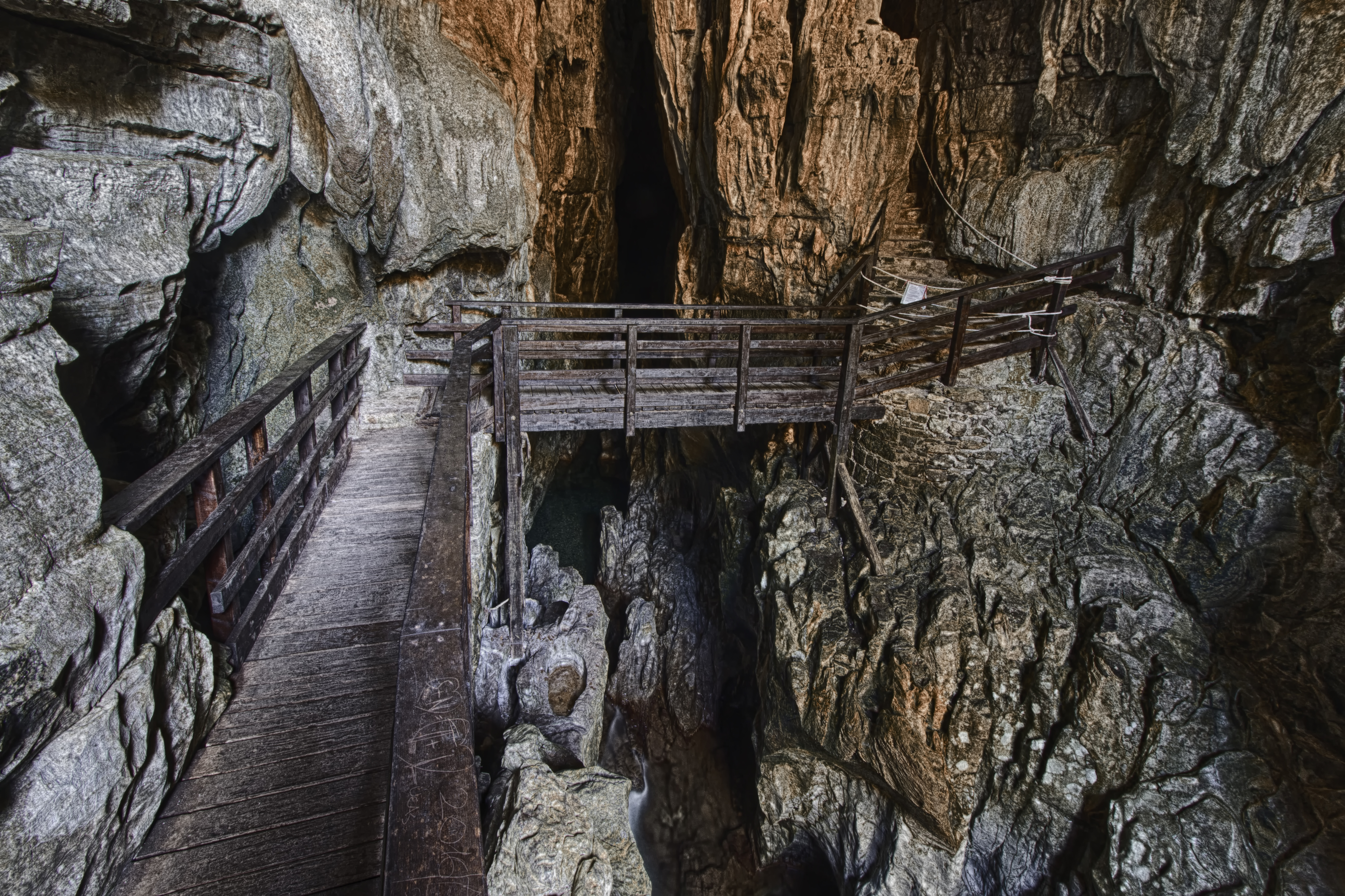
Entrance to the caves
