= Castel Ruggero =

- Frazione
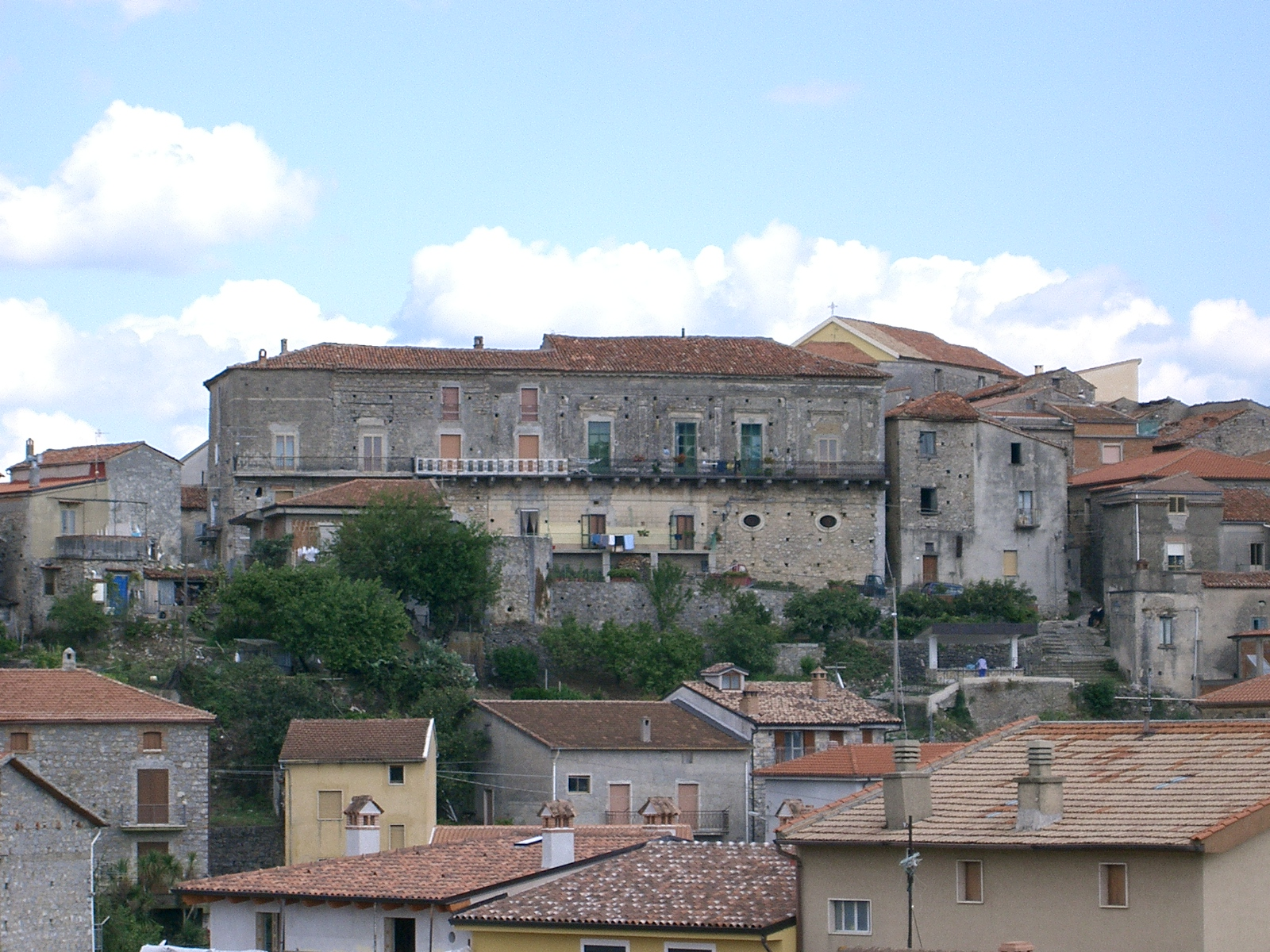
- View of the old town

- Location of Castel Ruggero in Italy
- Coordinates: 40°08′17″N 15°27′50″E
- Country: Italy
- Region: Campania
- Province: Salerno (SA)
- Comune: Torre Orsaia
- Elevation: 426 m (1,398 ft)

Population (2011)
  - Total: 400
- Demonym: Castelruggeresi
- Time zone: UTC+1 (CET)
  - Summer (DST): UTC+2 (CEST)
- Postal code: 84077
- Dialing code: (+39) 0974
- Patron saint: St Mary of the Snows
- Saint day: 5 August
- Website: Official website

Castel Ruggero, also spelled as Castelruggero, is a southern Italian village and hamlet (frazione) of Torre Orsaia, a municipality in the province of Salerno, Campania. As of 2011, it had a population of 400.

== History ==
The village was founded in 1150, as a military camp, that hosted the troops of Roger II of Sicily, and was named Castra Rogerii. Later, it was named Torre Superiore (i.e. "Upper Tower"), to distinguish it from Torre Inferiore ("Lower Tower", the current Torre Orsaia). In 1811 the village resumed the original name and became, until 1927, an autonomous municipality, when it merged in Torre Orsaia.

== Geography ==
Castel Ruggero is a hill village located in southern Cilento, part of its national park, that lies above Torre Orsaia (1.7 km south). It is 7 km from Roccagloriosa, 11 from Alfano, 13 from Policastro (by the Tyrrhenian Coast), and 14 from Sicilì and Morigerati.

== Main sights ==
Main sights of the village include the old town and its palaces (De Siervi, Imbriaco, Mariosa, Pecorelli) and the Sanctuary of St. Anthony.

== Transport ==
Castel Ruggero is crossed in the middle by the national highway SS 18, and the exit "Torre Orsaia", part of the SS 517/var highway Padula-Policastro, that is 8 km south. Torre Orsaia station, located in the village of Calleo and part of the Naples-Salerno-Reggio Calabria railway, is 7 km south.

== Gallery ==
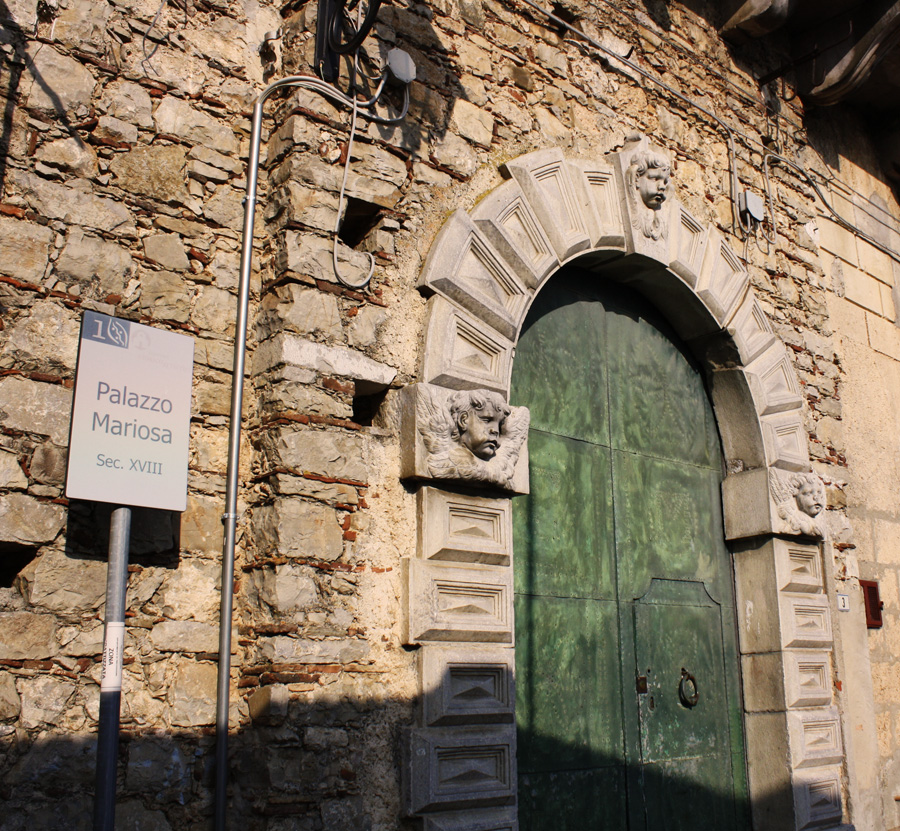
Mariosa Palace

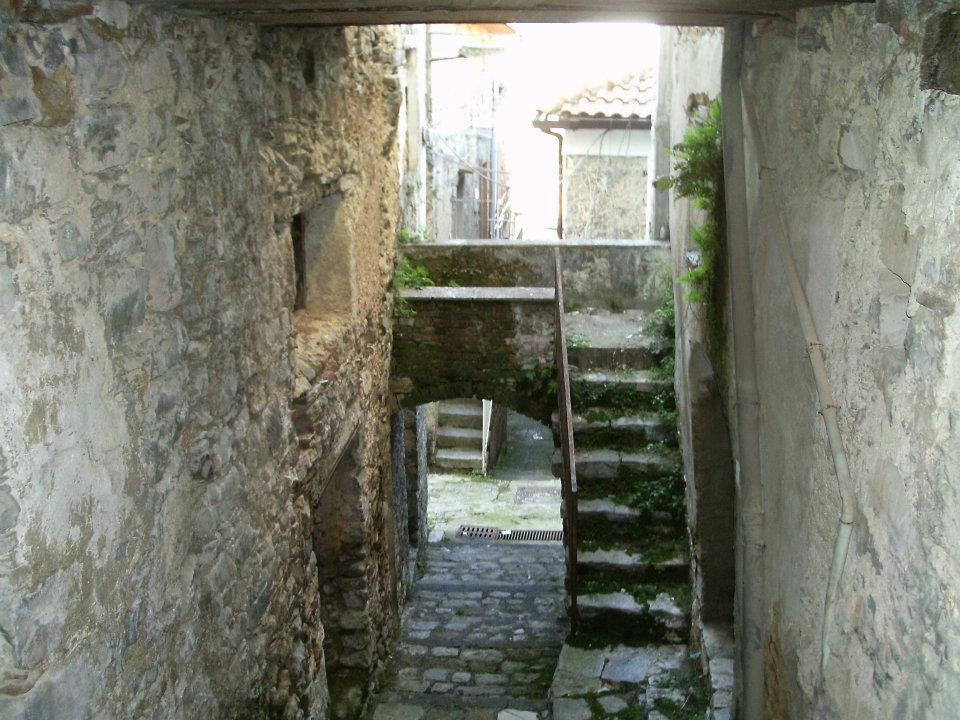
A road in the old town

== See also ==
- Cilentan dialect
