= Tortora (disambiguation) =

Tortora, an Italian word meaning turtle dove, may refer to:

== Places ==
- Tortora, an Italian municipality of the Province of Cosenza, Calabria

== People ==
- Enzo Tortora, Italian journalist and politician
- Max Tortora (born 1963), Italian actor

== See also ==
- Tortola, an island part of the British Virgin Islands
- Tortorella, Campania, an Italian municipality of the Province of Salerno, Campania
- Tortorella (disambiguation)
