= Casaletto Spartano =

- Comune
- Comune di Casaletto Spartano
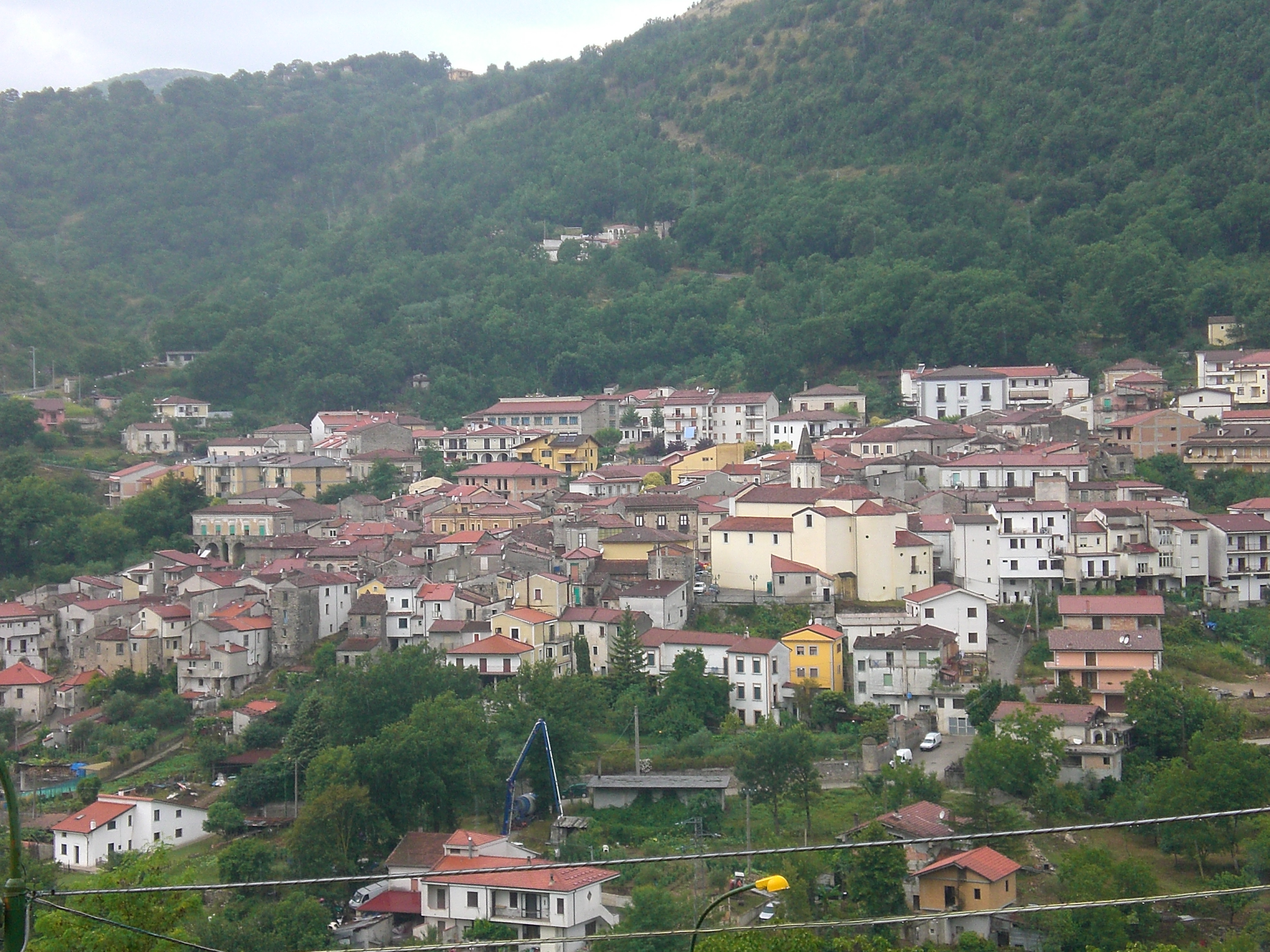

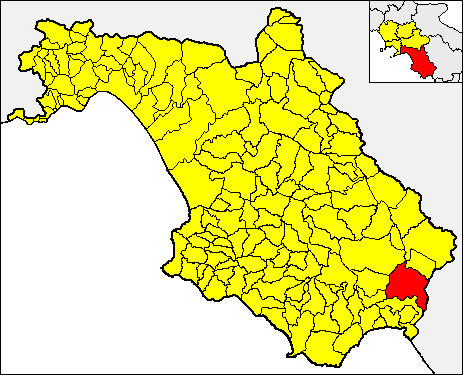
- Casaletto Spartano within the Province of Salerno

- Location within Italy Location within Campania
- Coordinates: 40°9′1.48″N 15°37′8.15″E
- Country: Italy
- Region: Campania
- Province: Salerno (SA)
- Frazioni: Battaglia

Government
  - Mayor: Giacomo Scannelli

Area
  - Total: 86.57 km^{2} (33.42 sq mi)
- Elevation: 540 m (1,770 ft)

Population (28 February 2017)
  - Total: 1,395
  - Density: 16.11/km^{2} (41.74/sq mi)
- Demonym: Casalettani
- Time zone: UTC+1 (CET)
  - Summer (DST): UTC+2 (CEST)
- Postal code: 84030
- Dialing code: 0973
- ISTAT code: 065027
- Patron saint: St. Nicholas of Bari
- Saint day: 13 May, 15 August, 8 September
- Website: Official website

Casaletto Spartano is a town and comune in the province of Salerno in the Campania region of south-western Italy.

== History ==
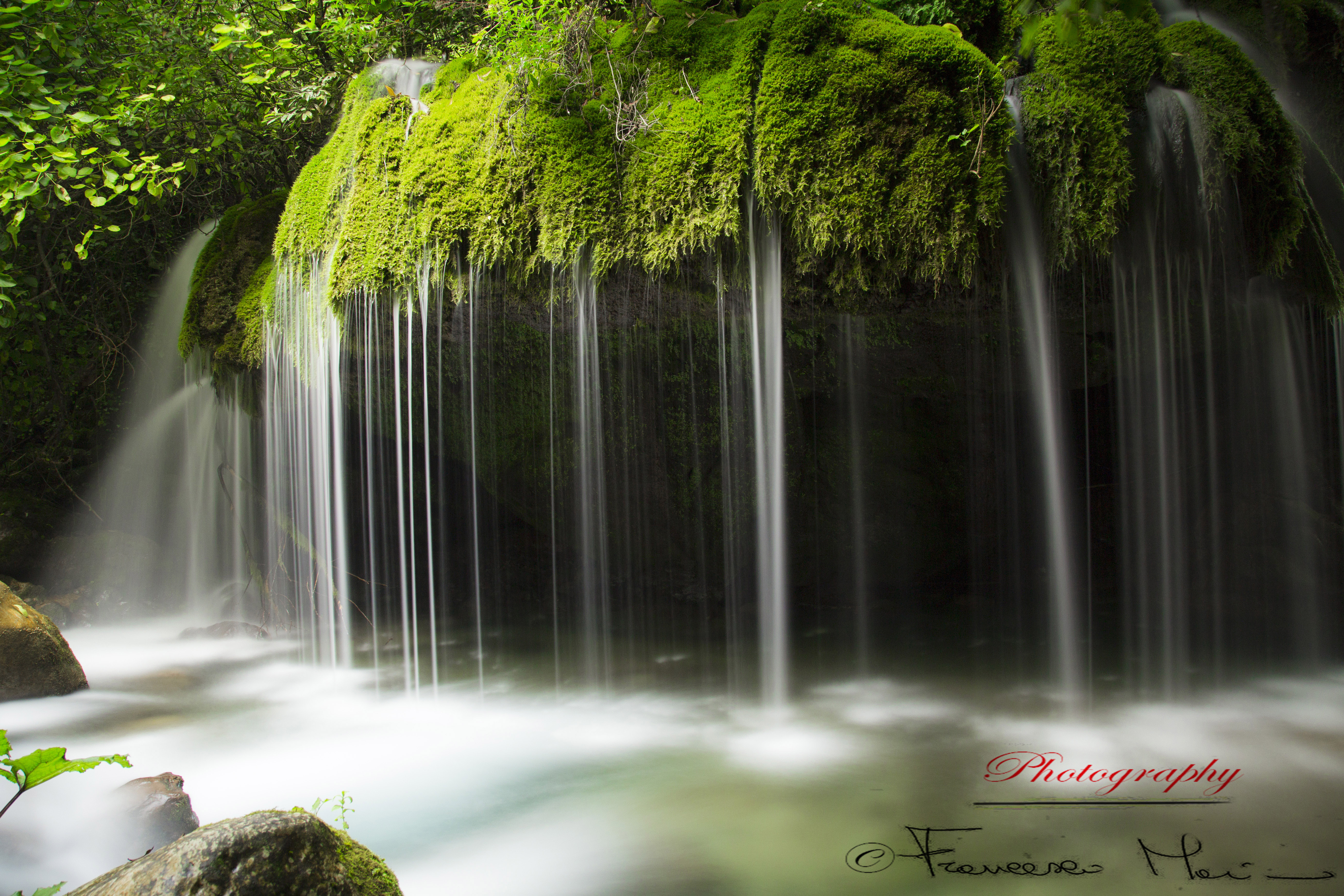
Capelli di Venere ("Venus' hair") waterfall

The town has medieval origins and originated around the settlement of Spartoso, from which it derives the toponym, changed in Spartano, that literally means "Spartan".

== Geography ==
Located in southern Cilento, between the Cilentan Coast and the Vallo di Diano, Casaletto Spartano is a hilltown located in the middle of a large forest area part of Cilento and Vallo di Diano National Park. The nearest settlements are Battaglia and Tortorella. The town is crossed by Bussentino, a tributary creek of Bussento river.

The municipal territory borders with Basilicata region and with the municipalities of Casalbuono, Caselle in Pittari, Lagonegro, Morigerati, Rivello, Sanza, Torraca, Tortorella and Vibonati.

The only hamlet (frazione) is the nearby village of Battaglia (40°8′49.81″N 15°37′28.2″E), originally named Bactalearum. It is located just below the hill of Casaletto, and its population was 119.

Other minor localities, at almost composed by few scattered farmhouses, are Affonnatora, Barbieri, Capello, Caravo, Castagna Grossa, Cerreta, Chiapponi, Conca, Fortino, Gioncoli, Marano, Mariolomeo, Melette, Monte Grosso, Pantanelle, Pie' dei Balzi, Serra dell'Edera, Sisamo, Valle Frassino, Vallennora, Vallonsecco and Varco delle Chiappe.

== Main sights ==
Most of the sights of Casaletto are represented by the natural environment of its territory. Some examples are the caves of Mariolomeo and Vottarino, its nature trails, the Capello Waterfall and others.

== Transport ==
The municipality is crossed by the provincial road SP 16, linking Caselle in Pittari with Sapri, and by the SP 349, departing from Battaglia and arriving at Fortino, at the borders of Lagonegro municipality. In Fortino is also located "Casaletto Spartano-Battaglia" station, part of the closed Sicignano–Lagonegro railway.

== See also ==
- Cilentan dialect
