= Tortorella =

Tortorella may refer to:

== Places ==
- Tortorella, Campania, an Italian municipality of the Province of Salerno, Campania
- Tortorella Airfield, an Italian abandoned World War II military airfield near Foggia, Apulia

== People ==
- Aldo Tortorella (1926–2025), Italian journalist, politician and partisan
- Cino Tortorella (1927–2017), Italian television presenter
- John Tortorella (born 1958), American ice hockey coach
- Nico Tortorella (born 1988), American actor

== See also ==
- Tortora (disambiguation)
