= Morigerati =

- Comune
- Comune di Morigerati
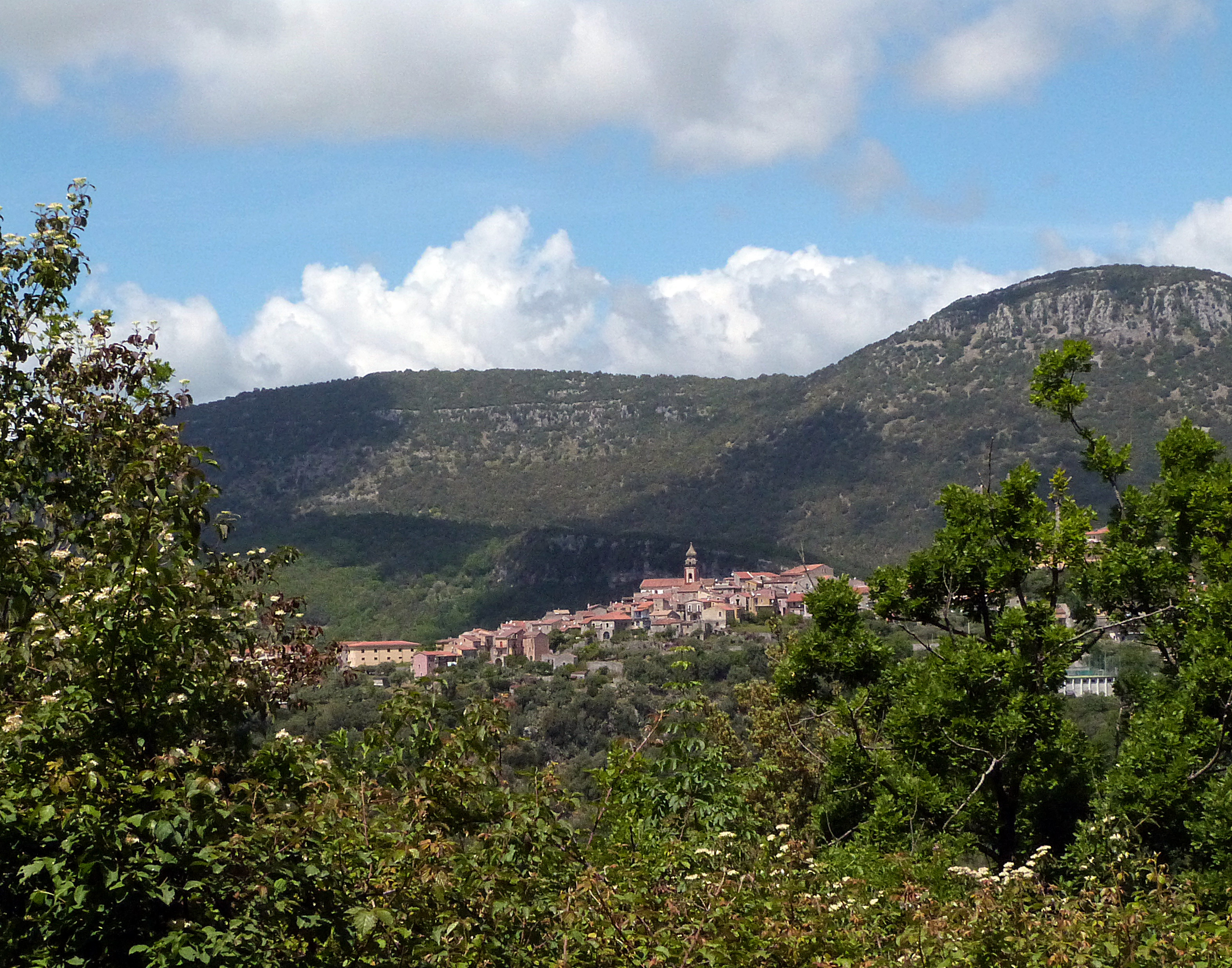
- View from the surrounding mountains

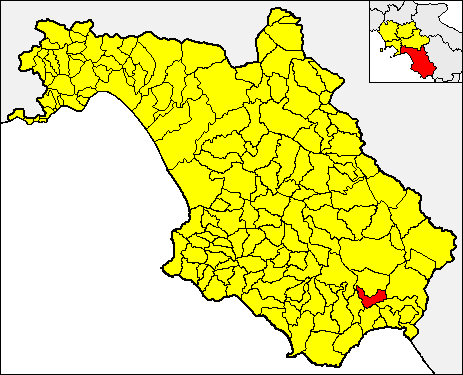
- Morigerati within the Province of Salerno

- Location within Italy Location within Campania
- Coordinates: 40°08′24.4″N 15°33′18.9″E
- Country: Italy
- Region: Campania
- Province: Salerno (SA)
- Frazioni: Sicilì

Government
  - Mayor: Vincenzina Prota

Area
  - Total: 21.19 km^{2} (8.18 sq mi)

Population (28 February 2017)
  - Total: 665
  - Density: 31.4/km^{2} (81.3/sq mi)
- Time zone: UTC+1 (CET)
  - Summer (DST): UTC+2 (CEST)
- Postal code: 84030
- Dialing code: 0974
- Patron saint: Demetrius of Thessaloniki
- Saint day: 26 August
- Website: Official website

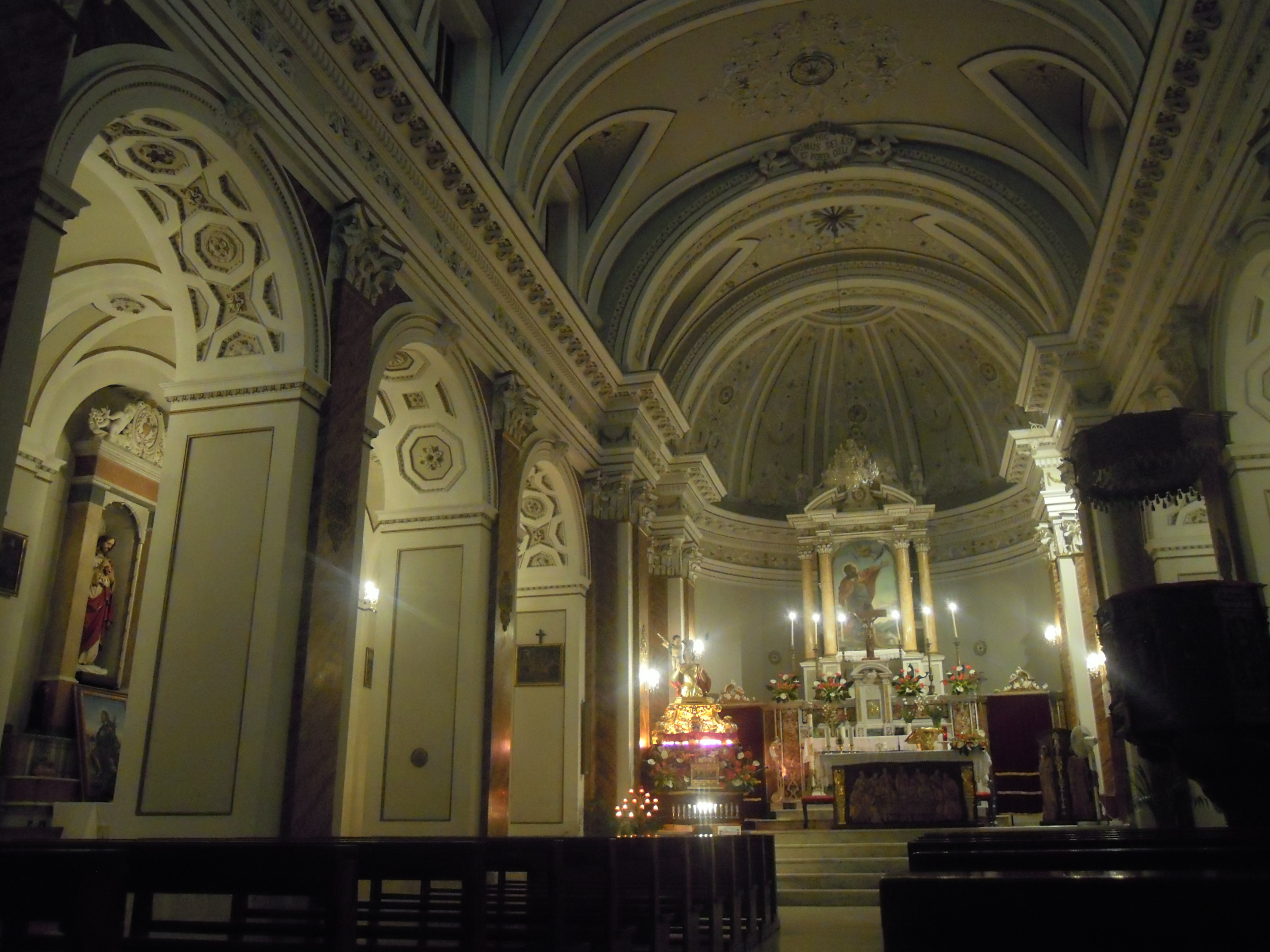
San Demetrio Church.

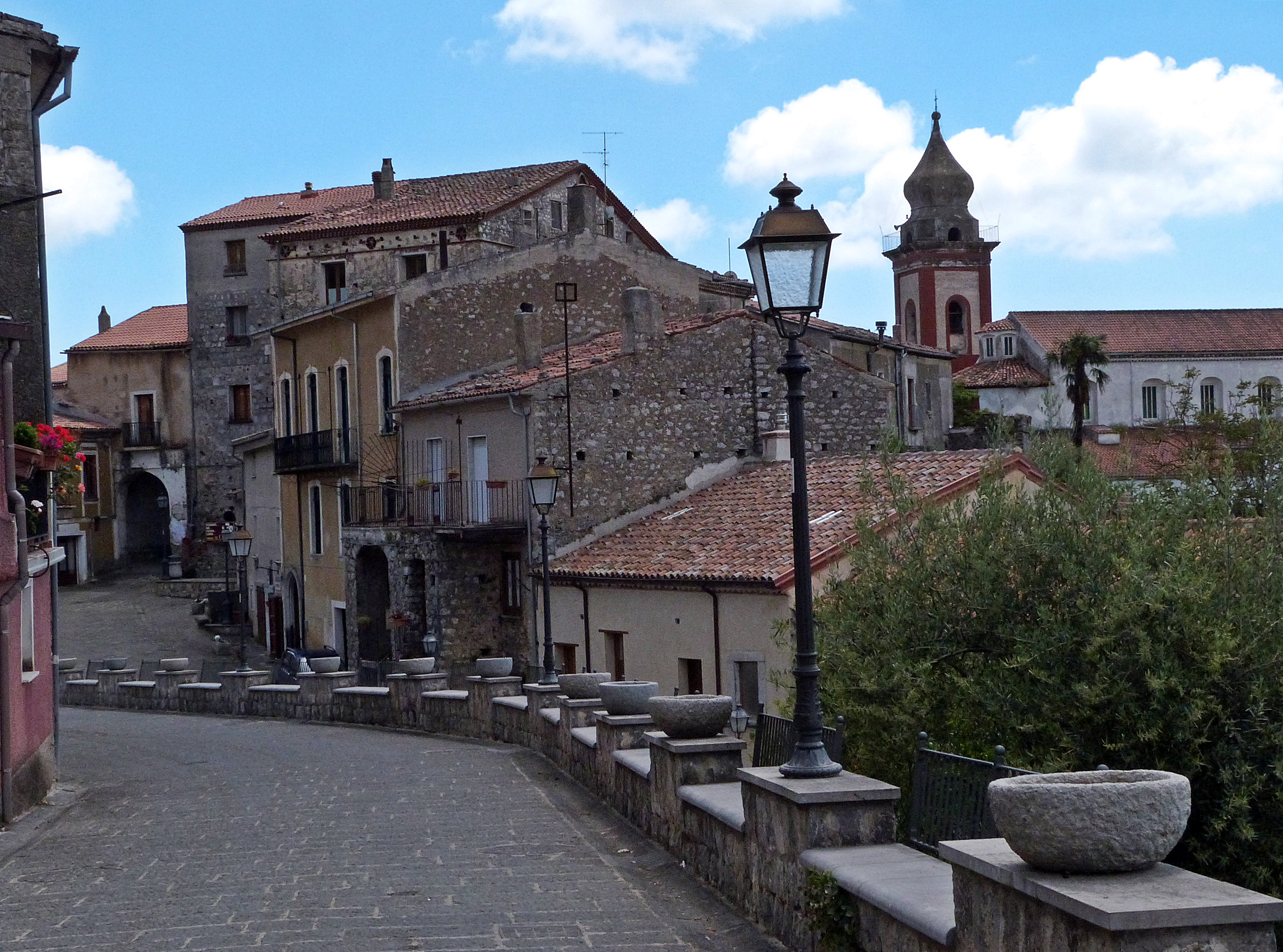
A road in the old town.

Morigerati (Cilentan: Murgirati) is a town and comune in the province of Salerno in the Campania region of south-western Italy.

== History ==
The village was probably founded by the ancient Italic people of the Morgetes. It was later colonized by the Ancient Roman, as witnessed by some ruins in a locality named Rumanuru.

== Geography ==
The municipality, located in southern Cilento and part of its national park, is crossed by the Bussento river. It borders with Casaletto Spartano, Caselle in Pittari, Santa Marina, Torre Orsaia and Tortorella. Its only hamlet (frazione) is the village of Sicilì, that has a population of 364.

== Main sights ==
- Bussento Caves, a WWF oasis along Bussento river. It is a nature reserve that includes gorges and caves by the river.
- The local Ethnographic Museum

== Transport ==
The town is served by the national highway SS 517/var Padula-Policastro at the exit "Sicilì-Morigerati", 11 km west. The highway links the Cilentan highway to the A3 Motorway.

== See also ==
- Cilentan dialect
