= Torraca =

- Comune
- Comune di Torraca
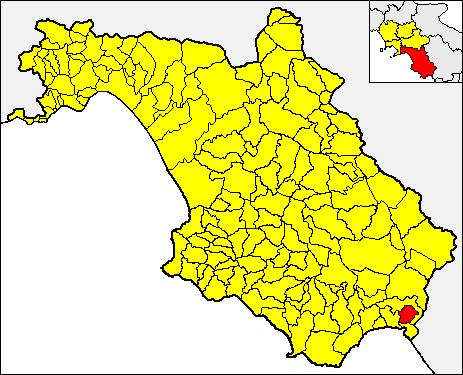
- Torraca within the Province of Salerno

- Location within Italy Location within Campania
- Coordinates: 40°07′N 15°38′E
- Country: Italy
- Region: Campania
- Province: Salerno (SA)

Government
  - Mayor: Francesco Bianco (since April 2015)

Area
  - Total: 15 km^{2} (5.8 sq mi)
- Elevation: 425 m (1,394 ft)

Population (December 31, 2007)
  - Total: 1,262
  - Density: 84/km^{2} (220/sq mi)
- Demonym: Torrachesi
- Time zone: UTC+1 (CET)
  - Summer (DST): UTC+2 (CEST)
- Postal code: 84030
- Dialing code: 0973
- Website: Official website

Torraca is a town and comune in the province of Salerno in the Campania region of south-western Italy.

== History ==
=== The LED city ===
In 2007, the town spent 280,000 euro to convert all its 700 street lamps to LED technology, the first instance of this in the world, and thereby reduced its energy and maintenance costs by 70%. Due to this, the town was awarded the Kyoto 2007 prize. Newspapers referred to Torraca as "LED city".

== Geography ==
The town is situated in the south of Cilento, a few kilometers from Sapri and Maratea and close to the borders of Campania with Basilicata. The surrounding municipalities are Casaletto Spartano, Sapri, Tortorella and Vibonati.
