= Polished plaster =

Term for the finish of some plasters

Polished plaster is a term for the finish of some plasters and for the description of new and updated forms of traditional Italian plaster finishes. The term covers a whole range of decorative plaster finishes, from the very highly polished Venetian plaster and Marmorino to the rugged look of textured polished plasters. Polished plaster itself tends to consist of slaked lime, marble dust, and/or marble chips, which give each plaster its distinctive look. A lime-based polished plaster may contain over 40% of marble powder.

Polished plaster is mainly used internally, on walls and ceilings, to give a finish that looks like polished marble, travertine, or limestone. Such plasters are usually applied over a primer and basecoat base, from one to four layers. They are finished (burnished) with a specialised steel trowel to a smooth glass-like sheen. Polished plaster is usually sealed with a protective layer of wax.

== Venetian plaster ==
Venetian plaster is a wall and ceiling finish consisting of plaster mixed with marble dust, applied with a spatula or trowel in thin, multiple layers, which are then burnished to create a smooth surface with the illusion of depth and texture. Venetian plaster techniques include marmorino, scagliola, and sgraffito. When left un-burnished, Venetian plaster has a matte finish that is rough and stone-like to the touch. Un-burnished Venetian plaster is also very brittle and damages rather easily.

When applied correctly, Venetian plaster can be used to create a highly polished, rock-hard, marble-like finish. Venetian plaster is especially useful on surfaces where marble panels could not be installed easily, and on surfaces that would be too expensive to have carved from real marble such as columns, corbels, and curved walls.

Venetian plaster can be tinted, or colored using natural or synthetic colorants. The ability to tint Venetian plaster is especially helpful when a specific color of "marble" is desired, or when a color that does not exist naturally is wanted. Through the application of a top layer of wax sealant, Venetian plaster can also be rendered waterproof.

== See also ==
- Tadelakt
- Stucco
- Earthen plaster
