= Torre Orsaia =

- Comune
- Comune di Torre Orsaia
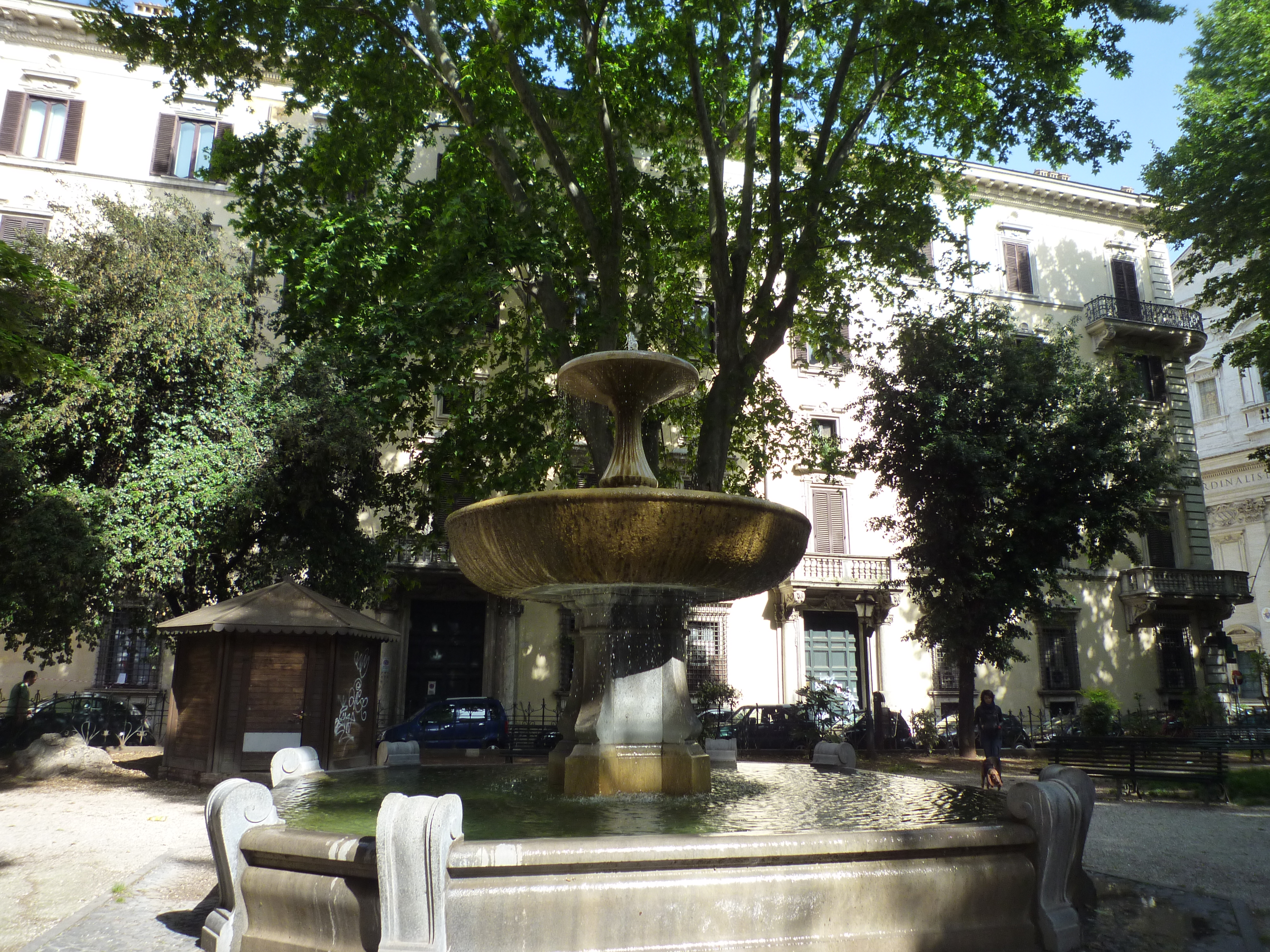
- Fountain in Lorenzo Padulo Square

- Coat of arms

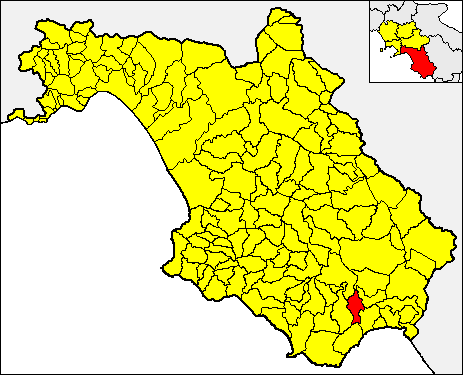
- Torre Orsaia within the Province of Salerno

- Location within Italy Location within Campania
- Coordinates: 40°08′N 15°28′E
- Country: Italy
- Region: Campania
- Province: Salerno (SA)
- Frazioni: Borgo Cerreto, Calleo, Castel Ruggero

Government
  - Mayor: Pietro Vicino

Area
  - Total: 21.03 km^{2} (8.12 sq mi)
- Elevation: 295 m (968 ft)

Population (31 December 2010)
  - Total: 2,259
  - Density: 107.4/km^{2} (278.2/sq mi)
- Demonym: Torresi / Ursentini
- Time zone: UTC+1 (CET)
  - Summer (DST): UTC+2 (CEST)
- Postal code: 84077
- Dialing code: 0974
- Patron saint: St. Lawrence
- Saint day: 10 August
- Website: Official website

Torre Orsaia (Cilentan: La Turri) is a town and comune in the province of Salerno in the Campania region of south-western Italy.

== History ==
The settlement, originally named Turris Ursajae, was founded in the 11th century, in the current location of the nearby village of Castel Ruggero.

== Geography ==
The municipality, located in southern Cilento and included in the Cilento and Vallo di Diano National Park, borders with Caselle in Pittari, Morigerati, Roccagloriosa, Rofrano, San Giovanni a Piro and Santa Marina. It counts the hamlets (frazioni) of Borgo Cerreto (shared with Rofrano), Calleo and Castel Ruggero (autonomous municipality until 1929).

== Main sights ==
The medieval town is situated on a green hill in the middle of centuries old Pisciotta olive trees. The stone fountains "dell’Olmo" and "della Scalitta" which are situated just outside the town are witnesses of the local craft industry.

== Transport ==
The town is crossed in the middle by the national highway SS 18 and is served by an exit, "Torre Orsaia", on the SS 517/var highway Padula-Policastro, that is 7.6 km far. Torre Orsaia station, located in the village of Calleo and part of the Naples-Salerno-Reggio Calabria railway, is 6.4 km from the town.

== Personalities ==
- Carmine Tripodi (1960-1985), carabinier, victim of the 'Ndrangeta

== See also ==
- Cilentan dialect
