= Scagliola =

Type of fine plaster

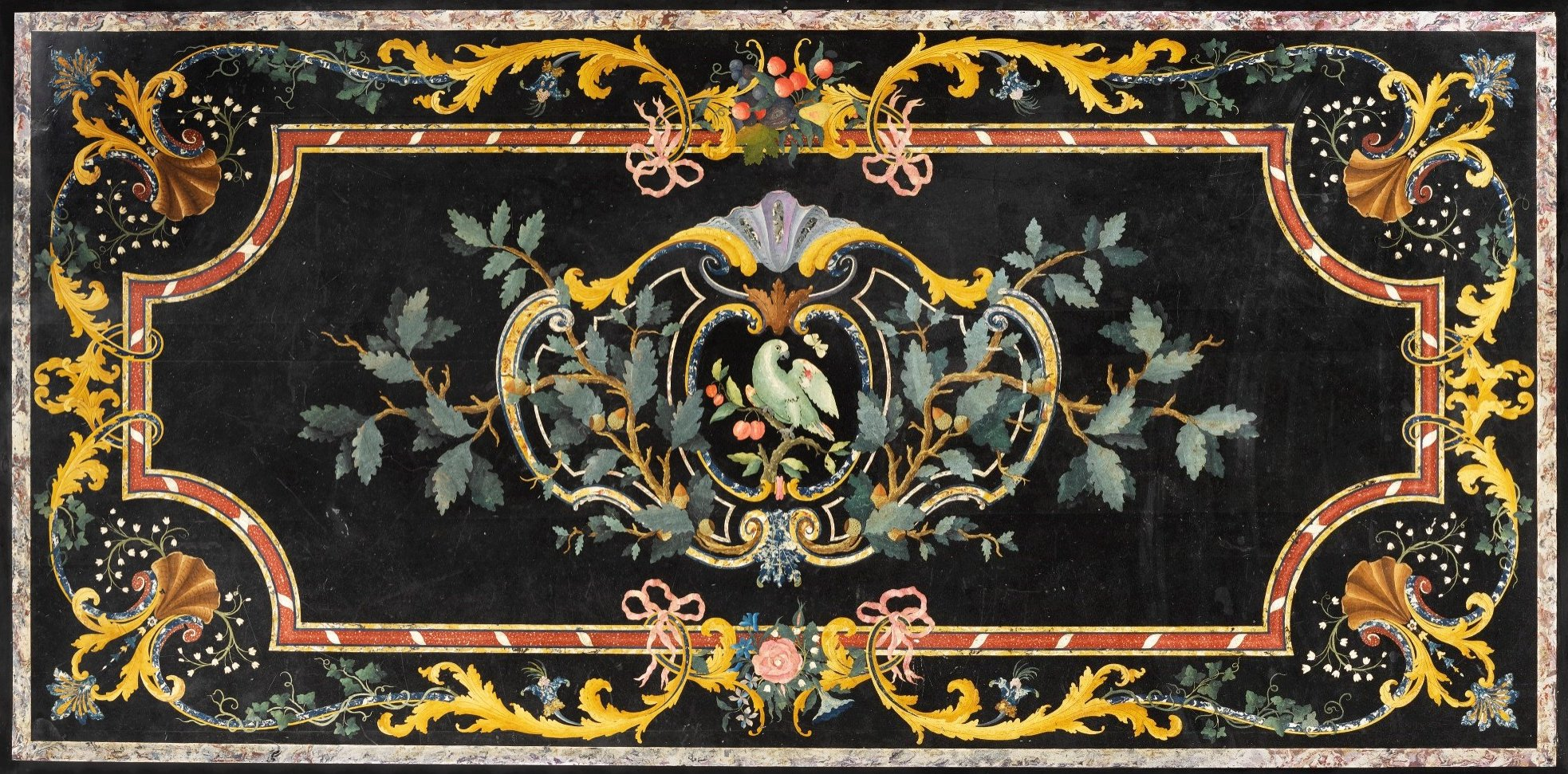
Italian scagliola top, second half of the 18th century

Scagliola (from the Italian scaglia, meaning "chips") is a type of fine plaster used in architecture and sculpture. The same term identifies the technique for producing columns, sculptures, and other architectural elements that resemble inlays in marble. The scagliola technique came into fashion in 17th-century Tuscany as an effective substitute for costly marble inlays, the pietra dura works created for the Medici family in Florence. The use of scagliola declined in the 20th century.

Scagliola is a composite substance made from plaster of Paris, glue and natural pigments, imitating marble and other hard stones. The material may be veined with colors and applied to a core, or desired pattern may be carved into a previously prepared scagliola matrix. The pattern's indentations are then filled with the colored, plaster-like scagliola composite, and then polished with flax oil for brightness, and wax for protection. The combination of materials and technique provides a complex texture, and richness of color not available in natural veined marbles.

A comparable material is terrazzo. Marmorino is a synonym, but scagliola and terrazzo should not be confused with plaster of Paris, which is one ingredient.

== Method ==
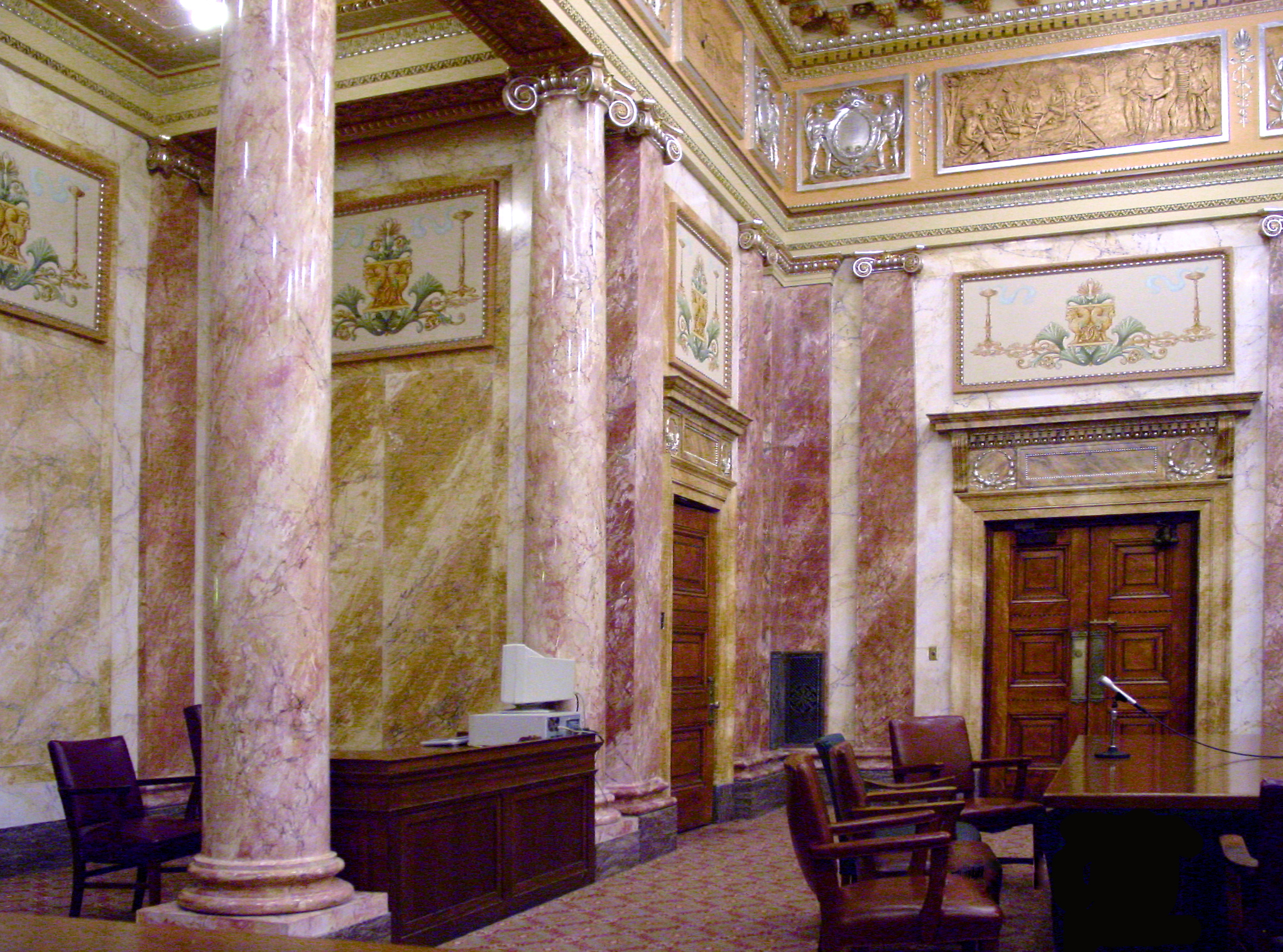
Scagliola in the Allen County Courthouse, Fort Wayne Indiana USA

Batches of pigmented plaster, modified with animal glue are applied to molds, armatures and pre-plastered wall planes in a manner that accurately mimics natural stone, breccia and marble. In one technique, veining is created by drawing strands of raw silk saturated in pigment through the plaster mix. Another technique involves trowellaying on several layers of translucent renders and randomly cutting back to a previous layer to achieve colour differential similar to jasper.

When dry, the damp surface was pumiced smooth, then buffed with a linen cloth impregnated with Tripoli (a siliceous rottenstone) and charcoal; finally it was buffed with oiled felt; beeswax was sometimes used for this purpose. Because the colours are integral to the plaster, the pattern is more resistant to scratching than with other techniques, such as painting on wood.

There are two scagliola techniques: in traditional 'Bavarian scagliola' coloured batches of plaster of Paris are worked to a stiff, dough-like consistency. The plaster is modified with the addition of animal glues such as isinglass or hide glue. 'Marezzo scagliola' is worked with the pigmented batches of plaster in a liquid state and relies mainly on the use of Keene's cement, a unique gypsum plaster product in which plaster of Paris was steeped in alum or borate, then burned in a kiln and ground to a fine powder; invented around 1840, it sets to an exceptionally hard state.

It is typically used without the addition of animal glues. Marezzo scagliola is often called American scagliola because of its widespread use in the United States in the late nineteenth and early twentieth centuries. Slabs of Marezzo scagliola may be used as table tops. When set, scagliola is hard enough to be turned on a lathe to form vases, balusters and finials.

== History ==
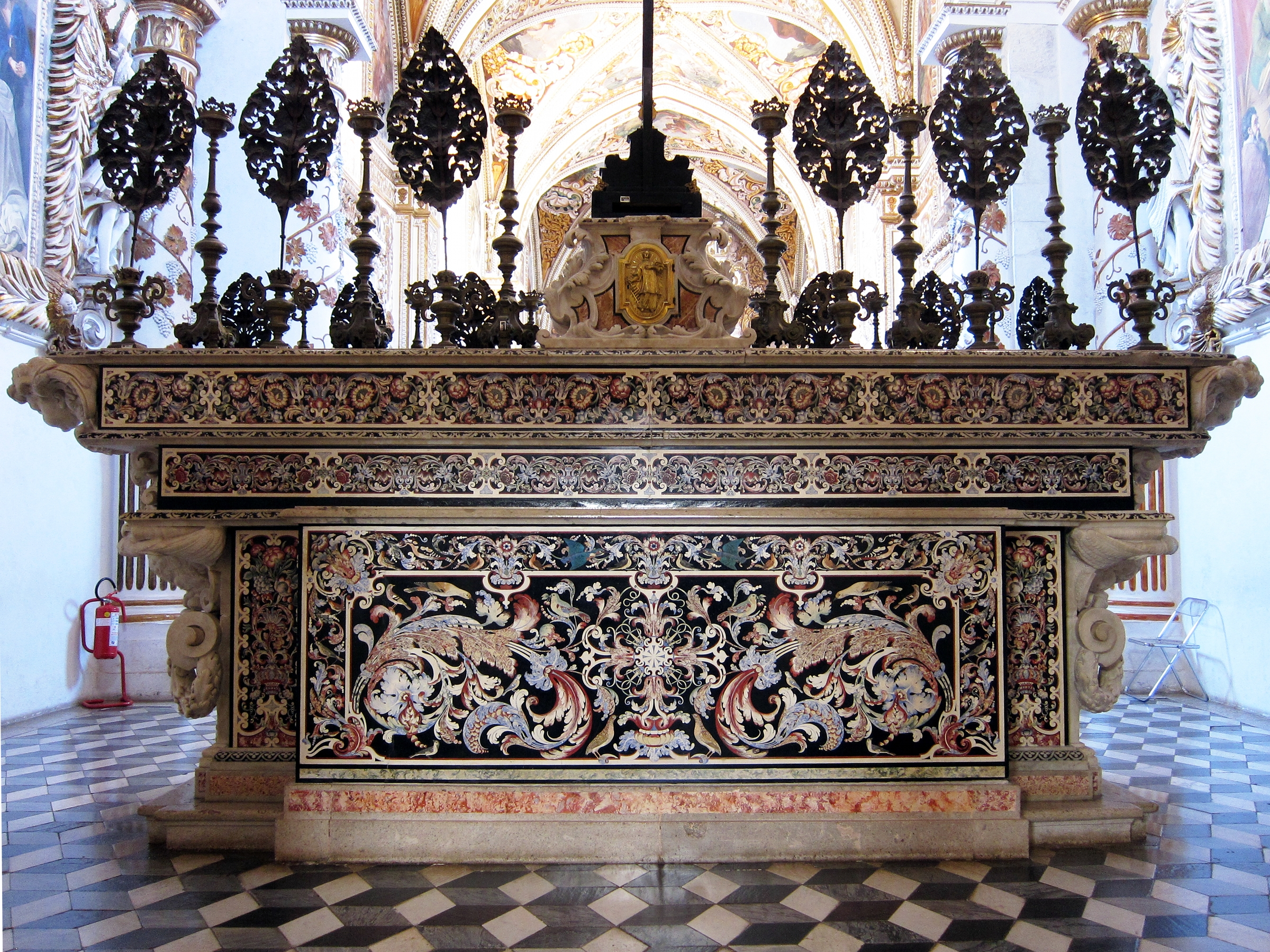
Scagliola work at the Certosa di Padula, Italy

While there is evidence of scagliola decoration in ancient Roman architecture, scagliola decoration became popular in Italian Baroque buildings in the 17th century, and was imitated throughout Europe until the 19th century. Superb altar frontals using this technique are to be found at the Certosa di Padula in Campania, Southern Italy.

An early use of scagliola in England is in a fireplace at Ham House, Surrey, which was brought from Italy along with the window sill in the reign of Charles II. This employs the use of a scagliola background which was then cut into to lay in the design.

In 1761, a scagliolista, Domenico Bartoli, from Livorno arrived in London and was employed by William Constable of Burton Constable Hall in Yorkshire. Here he produced two chimneypieces in white marble inlaid with scagliola embellishments directly into cut matrices in the marble. Apart from the protective edges of altars at Padula this seems to be the first use of this technique.

In 1766 he went into partnership with Johannes Richter, possibly from Dresden, who may have brought a young Pietro Bossi with him. The name Bossi is associated with a family of Northern Italian scagliolisti. Bartoli supplied table tops to Ireland and one chimneypiece at Belvedere House in Dublin could be attributed to Richter. Their styles are very different. There is little evidence that either of them came to Ireland.

Pietro Bossi arrived in Dublin in 1784 and probably died there in 1798. He produced a number of chimneypieces in Dublin of very good quality. Scagliola inlay proved to be desirable in Ireland and there appears to be a continuation long after it became unfashionable in England.

In 1911, Herbert Cescinsky, in English Furniture remarked that scagliola had been popular in Dublin fifty years before. This would explain an example at 86, Stephen's Green, clearly an 18th-century chimneypiece, which was later embellished in the middle of the 19th century for Crofton Vanderleur, formerly at 4, Parnell Square. A later firm, Sharpe & Emery, Pearce Street, Dublin produced a number of examples in the neo-classical Bossi style, sometimes using original chimneypieces.

The correspondence between British Resident in Florence Sir Horace Mann and Horace Walpole describes the process of obtaining a prized scagliola table top. Having received his first top from the Irishman Friar Ferdinando Henrico Hugford (1695–1771) around 1740 Walpole had asked his friend Mann to acquire some more... (one of these tables is at The Vyne. That table has the arms of Walpole (with his post 1726 Garter Knight embellishments) impaling Shorter - for Prime Minister Sir Robert Walpole and his first wife Catherine Shorter, who died 20 August 1737. He married Maria Skerret in early 1738, thus The Vyne's table could seem have been ordered before c1736-37).

In a letter dated 26 November 1741 Mann writes to Walpole:

Your scagliola table was near finished when behold the stone on which the stuff is put, opened of itself so that all that was done, to his [Hugford's] great mortification is spoilt. He would have been off for beginning again on account of his eyes etc., but I have begged he will do it and he is about it

and on 15 July 1742:

Your scagliola table is almost finished (you remember the first he [Hugford] undertook broke when near done) and is very handsome, but even in this commission my success is not complete, for I cannot persuade the padre [Hugford] to make its companion

and on 30 October 1742:

Your scagliola table is finished, though I have not got it home. The nasty priest [Hugford] will have 25 zecchins [£12 10s] besides many thanks, for the preference given to me, for some simple English have been tampering with him and offered 30 to get it, though it is by no means such a fine performance. The priest wishes I would not take it, as he would make a present of it to the Pope. He leaves Florence for good

and on 11 July 1747:

You bid me get you two scagliola tables, but don't mention the size or any other particulars. The man who made yours is no longer in Florence. Here is a scholar of his [Don Pietro Belloni?], but vastly inferior to him, and so slow in working that he has been almost three years about a pair for a Mr Leson [Joseph Leeson], and requires still six months more. I will endeavour to get somebody to write to the first friar [Hugford] and to engage him to make two tables in his convent and send them to Florence, of which I hope to be able to give you an account by next post.

and on 10 October 1749:

I am glad your scagliola tables please. You must make the greater account of them, as it is impossible to get any more of the same man [Hugford], nor indeed of his disciple here [Belloni], who is a priest too, and has been four years about a pair I bespoke of him, which he tells me plainly he cannot finish in less than two more. They work for diversion and won't be hurried.

In modern times—Tusmore House, Oxfordshire:

The great triumph of the saloon, however, is the use of scagliola, including the richly coloured and figured Sienna shafts of the eight fluted Corinthian columns...and the urns, entablature and balustrade to the second-floor landing which gives access to four plaster-vaulted ante rooms serving the main bedrooms. All this scagliola was produced by Richard Feroze, England's leading contemporary scagliola-maker.

Italian plasterworkers produced scagliola columns and pilasters for Robert Adam at Syon House (notably the columns in the Anteroom) and at Kedleston Hall (notably the pilasters in the Saloon). In 1816 the Coade Ornamental Stone Manufactory extended their practice to include scagliola; their scagliola was used by Benjamin Dean Wyatt at Apsley House, London.

In the United States scagliola was popular in the 19th and 20th centuries. Important US buildings featuring scagliola include the Mississippi State Capitol in Jackson, Mississippi (1903), Allen County Courthouse in Fort Wayne, Indiana, Belcourt Castle in Newport, Rhode Island, in the old El Paso County Courthouse (Colorado) in Colorado Springs, in the Kansas State Capitol in Topeka, Kansas, in Shea's Performing Arts Center in Buffalo, New York, and in the Navarro County Courthouse in Corsicana, TX. St. Louis Union Station in St. Louis, Missouri, prominently features scagliola in its magnificent Grand Hall, the Rialto Square Theatre, Joliet, IL, Cathedral of St. Helena in Helena, MT, Congregation Shearith Israel in New York City, Milwaukee Public Library Central Library in Milwaukee, WI and the French Lick Resort Casino, French Lick, IN which recently underwent a major restoration.

Scagliola has historically been considered an Ersatz material and an inexpensive alternative to natural stone. However, it has eventually come to be recognised as an exceptional example of the plasterer's craft and is now prized for its historic value as well as being used in new construction because of its benefits as a plastic material suited to molding in ornate shapes.

Scagliola columns are not generally built of the solid material. Instead scagliola is trowelled onto a canvas which is wrapped around the column's core, and the canvas peeled away when semi-hardened. The scagliola is then surfaced in place.

== Gallery ==
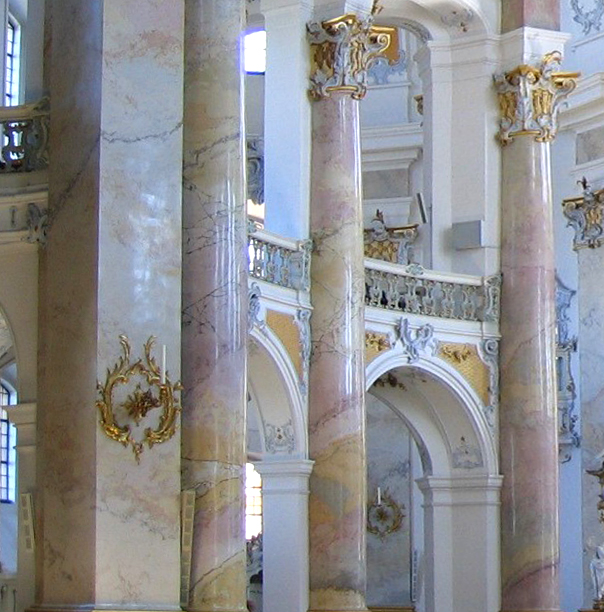
Scagliola in the Basilica of the Fourteen Holy Helpers near Bad Staffelstein, Germany

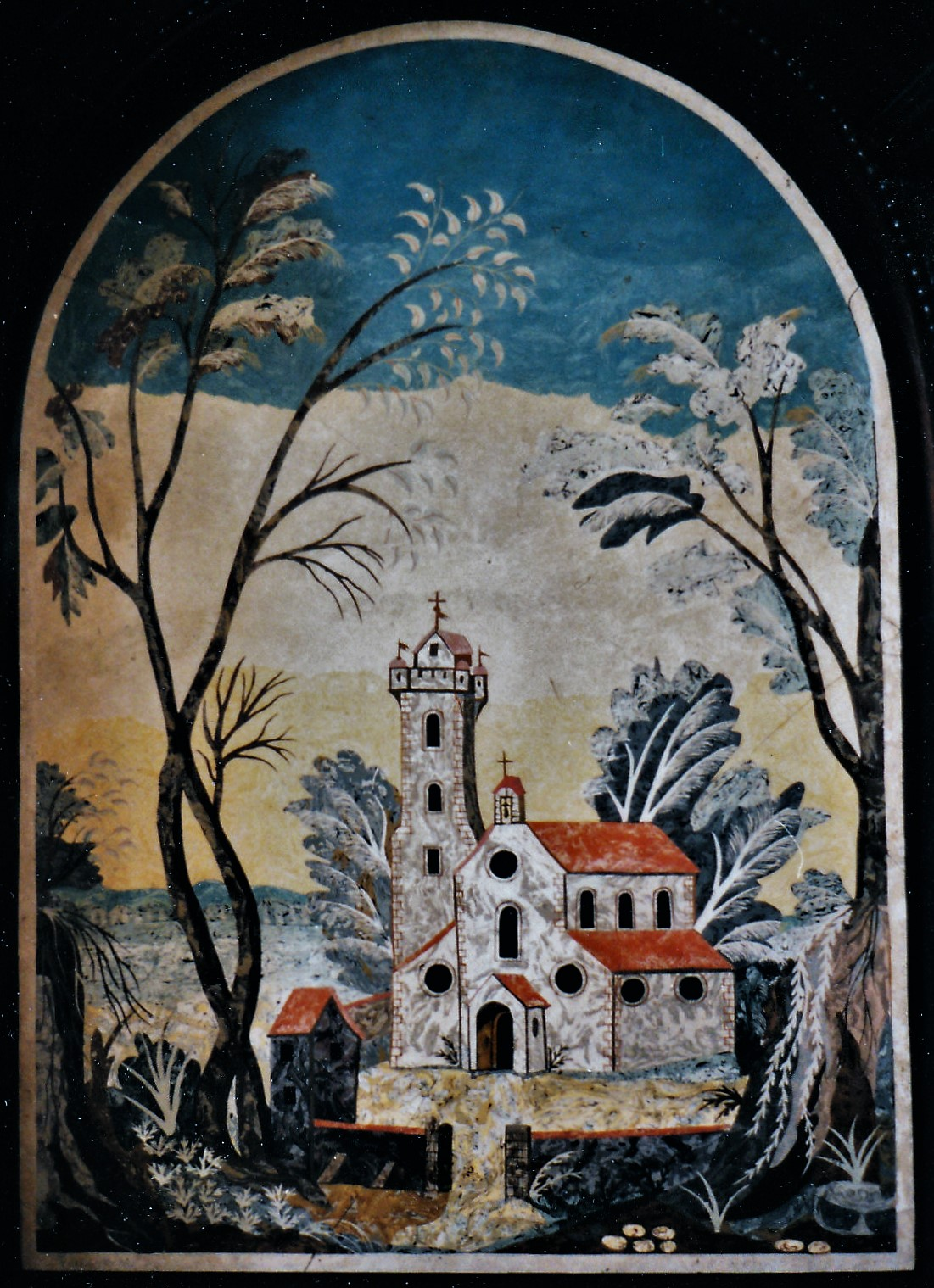
Scagliola in the St. Lorenz Basilica in Kempten im Allgäu, Germany

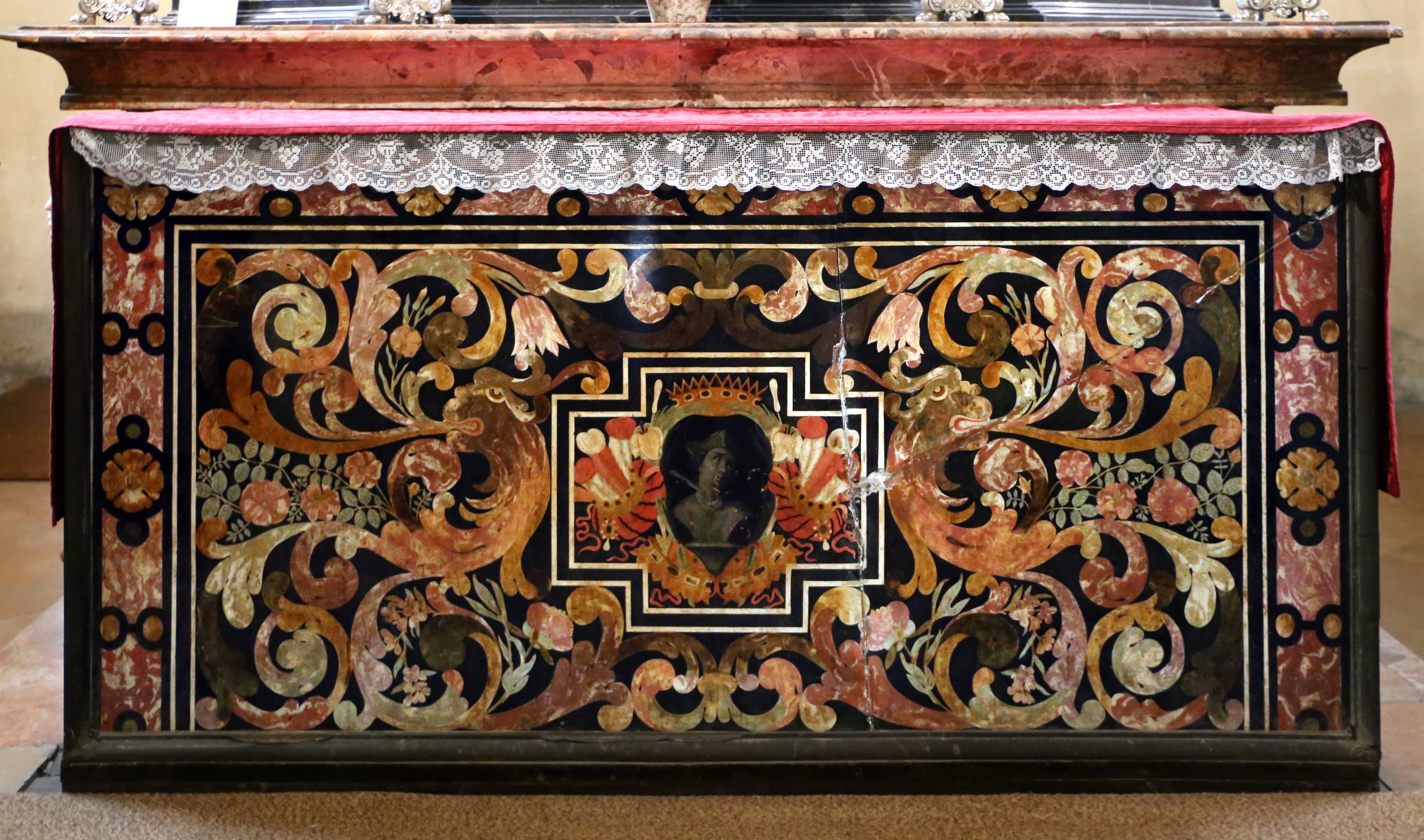
Scagliola altar in the Cappella di Sant'Aquilino, Milan, Italy

== See also ==
- Coade stone
- Marbleizing
- Polished plaster
