= Frank Valente =

Italian scientist, physicist and mathematician

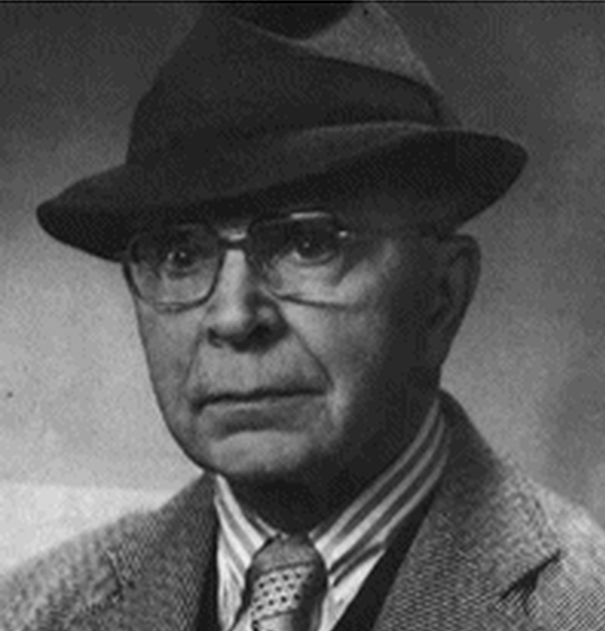
- Born: January 22, 1898; Padula, Italy
- Died: January 27, 1984 (aged 86); New York, United States
- Occupations: Scientist, physicist and mathematician

Francesco Antonio Valente, known as Frank (January 22, 1898, in Padula, Italy – January 27, 1984, in New York) was an Italian scientist, physicist and mathematician naturalized who was a United States citizen.

== Biography ==
He emigrated to New York in 1902 with his father Angelo and mother Rosina. Enrolled in Paterson High School, he completed his studies in chemistry in 1922 and physics in 1924. His parents committed to spending their entire lives in the New World, certain of making a fortune. The whole family went to work, not neglecting cultural integration into American life. Within this extremely challenging context, they noticed the diligent and constant effort Frank put into his studies. Frank encountering various challenges during his educational path, difficulties caused by the immigrant condition that offered only disadvantages: discrimination, language pronunciation difficulties compared to the children of Americans.

He married Laura Troy Valente, who died on February 22, 1964, at the age of 63.

== Career ==
He studied until 1939, when he received his Ph.D. in nuclear physics, focusing his attentions on researching the atom. He taught at the Rensselaer Polytechnic Institute and, as his last wish, he left a large part of his assets to it because he had spent his best energies there studying on nuclear energy. Upon his death, he had decreed in his will that what he left should be committed to the aid of men of ingenuity capable of advancing the study of physics and the nuclear sciences.

In the last years of his life Frank Valente taught at Seattle University, also writing articles; he never retired. He died on January 27, 1984.

== Publications ==
- A manual of experiments in reactor physics, Macmillan, New York, 1963.

== See also ==
- Seattle University
- Rensselaer Polytechnic Institute
