= Marmorino =

Type of plaster or stucco

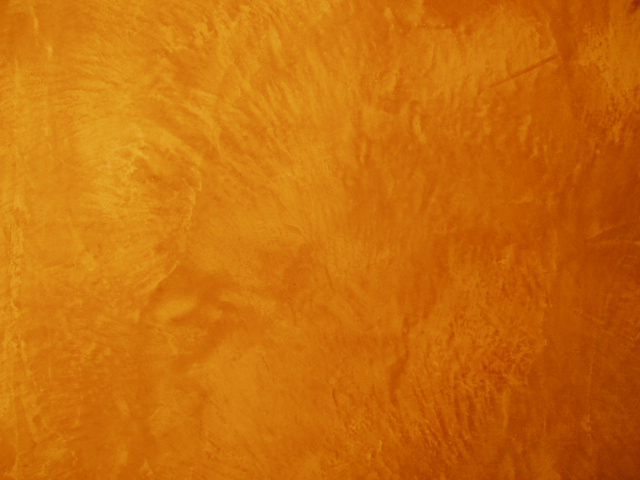
Marmorino stucco.

Marmorino Veneziano or Marmorino plaster is a type of plaster or stucco based on calcium oxide and used for interior and exterior wall decorations. Depending on the finishing technique, it can have a matte, satin, or glossy surface. It was used in Roman times, and was revived during the Renaissance in Venice.

Marmorino is made from crushed marble and lime putty, which can be tinted to give a wide range of colours. This can then be applied to make many textures, from polished marble to natural stone. Widely used in Italy, it is now popular worldwide. Because it requires skilled workmanship, it is expensive. It is found in public buildings, bars, restaurants, etc.

Besides its appearance, its waterproofing and antibacterial qualities make it suitable for bathrooms and other wet areas. It is also used on exteriors.

== History ==
Marmorino is a classic Venetian plaster; however, its origins date to ancient Rome and it can be seen in the villas of Pompeii and other Roman structures. Vitruvius discussed it in his De architectura in the 1st Century B.C. Marmorino was rediscovered in the 15th century. This 'new' plaster conformed well to the aesthetic requirements dictated by the classical ideal that in the 15th century had recently become fashionable in the Venetian lagoon.

The first record of work being done with marmorino is a building contract with the nuns of Santa Chiara of Murano in 1473. This document specifies that before the marmorino could be applied, the wall had to be prepared with a mortar made of lime and "coccio pesto" (ground terra cotta). This "coccio pesto" was then excavated from tailings of bricks or recycled from old roof tiles.

At this point, to better understand the popularity of marmorino in Venetian life, two facts need to be considered. The first is that in a city that extends over water, the transport of sand for making plaster and the disposal of tailings was, and still is, a huge problem. So the use of marmorino was successful not only because the substrate was prepared using terra cotta scraps, but also the finish, marmorino, was made with leftover stone and marble, which were in great abundance. These ground discards were mixed with lime to create marmorino.

Besides, marmorino and substrates made of "coccio pesto" resisted the ambient dampness of the lagoon better than almost any other plaster. The first because it is extremely breathable by virtue of the kind of lime used (only lime which sets on exposure to air after losing excess water) and the second, because it contains terracotta which when added to lime makes the mixture hydraulic, that is, it is effective even in very damp conditions (because it contains silica and aluminium, bases of modern cement and Hydraulic lime preparations). The second consideration is that an aesthetically pleasing result could be achieved in an era dominated by the return of a classical Greco-Roman style allowing less weight to be transmitted to the foundation when compared to covering facades with a stone veneer.

Usually, marmorino was white to imitate Istrian stone, which was most often used in Venetian construction, but was occasionally decorated with frescoes to imitate marble, which Venetian merchants brought home from their voyages to the Orient. (In this period of the Republic of Venice, merchants felt obliged to return home bearing precious, exotic marble as a tribute to the beauty of their own city.)

Marmorino maintained its prestige for centuries until the end of the 1800s when interest in it faded and it was considered just an economical substitute for marble. Only at the end of the 1970s, thanks in part to the architect Carlo Scarpa, did this finish become fashionable among modern architects.

For about 10 years, builders were only interested in artisanal marmorino. Today, ready-to-use marmorino mix can be found, often with glue added to allow it to be applied on non-traditional surfaces such as drywall or wood panelling.

== See also ==
- Scagliola
- Stucco
