= Certosa di Padula =

Carthusian monastery in Padula, Italy

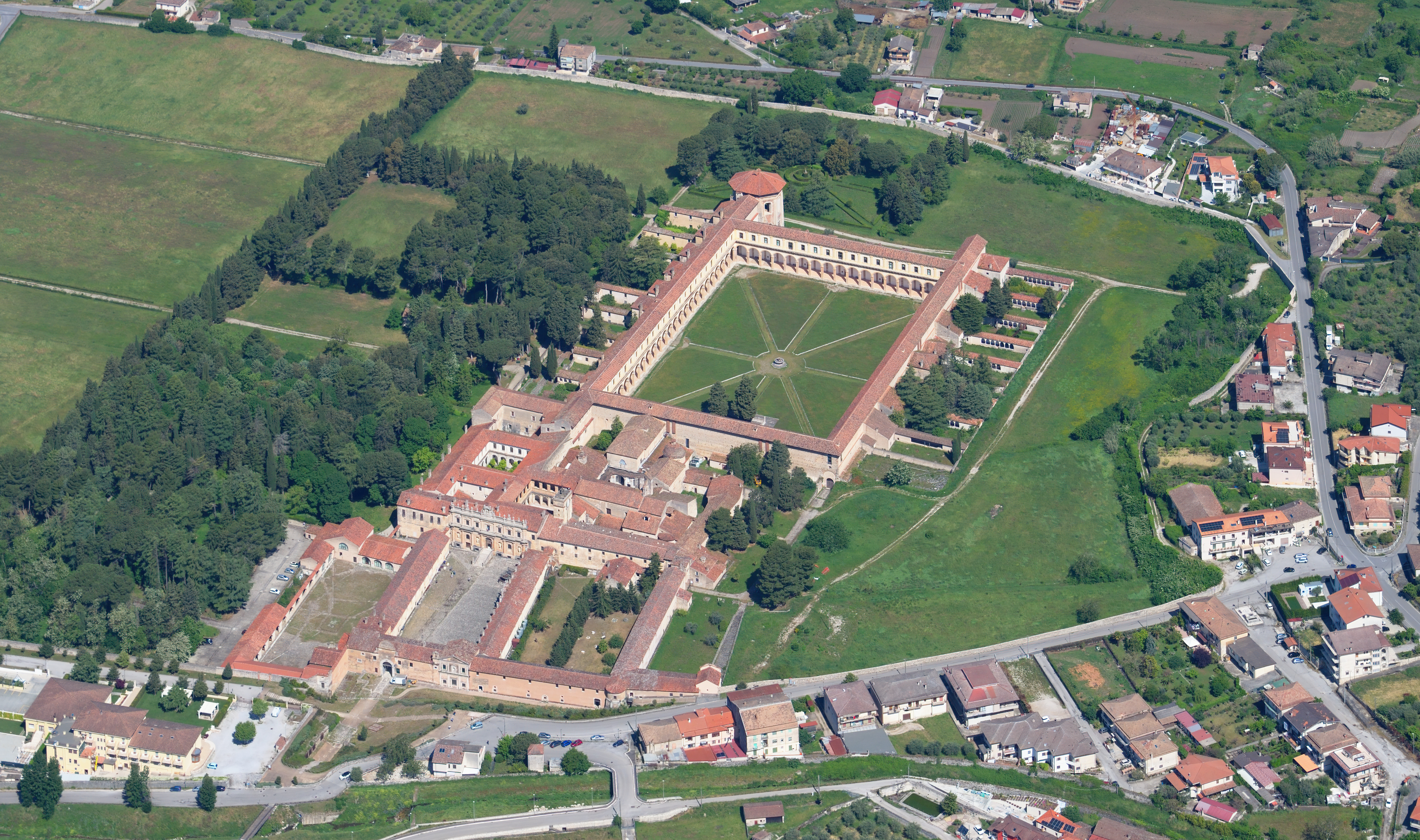
- Interactive map of Certosa di Padula
- 40°20′14″N 15°39′07″E
- Type: Monastery
- Location: Padula, Campania, Italy

UNESCO World Heritage Site
- Official name: Cilento and Vallo di Diano National Park with the Archaeological sites of Paestum and Velia, and the Certosa di Padula
- Type: Cultural
- Criteria: iii, iv
- Designated: 1998 (22nd session)
- Reference no.: 842
- Region: Europe and North America

Padula Charterhouse (Italian: Certosa di Padula, Certosa di San Lorenzo di Padula) is a large Carthusian monastery, or charterhouse, located in the town of Padula, in the Cilento National Park, in Southern Italy. It is a World Heritage Site.

The monastery is the largest in Italy. Its building history covers 450 years, but the principal parts of the buildings are in Baroque style. It is a very large monastery, comprising 51,500 m^{2} (12.7 acres), with 320 rooms and halls.

== History ==
Padula Charterhouse was founded by Tommaso di San Severino on 27 April 1306 on the site of an earlier monastery. It is dedicated to Saint Lawrence, and its architectural structure supposedly recalls the griddle-iron upon which the saint was burnt alive.

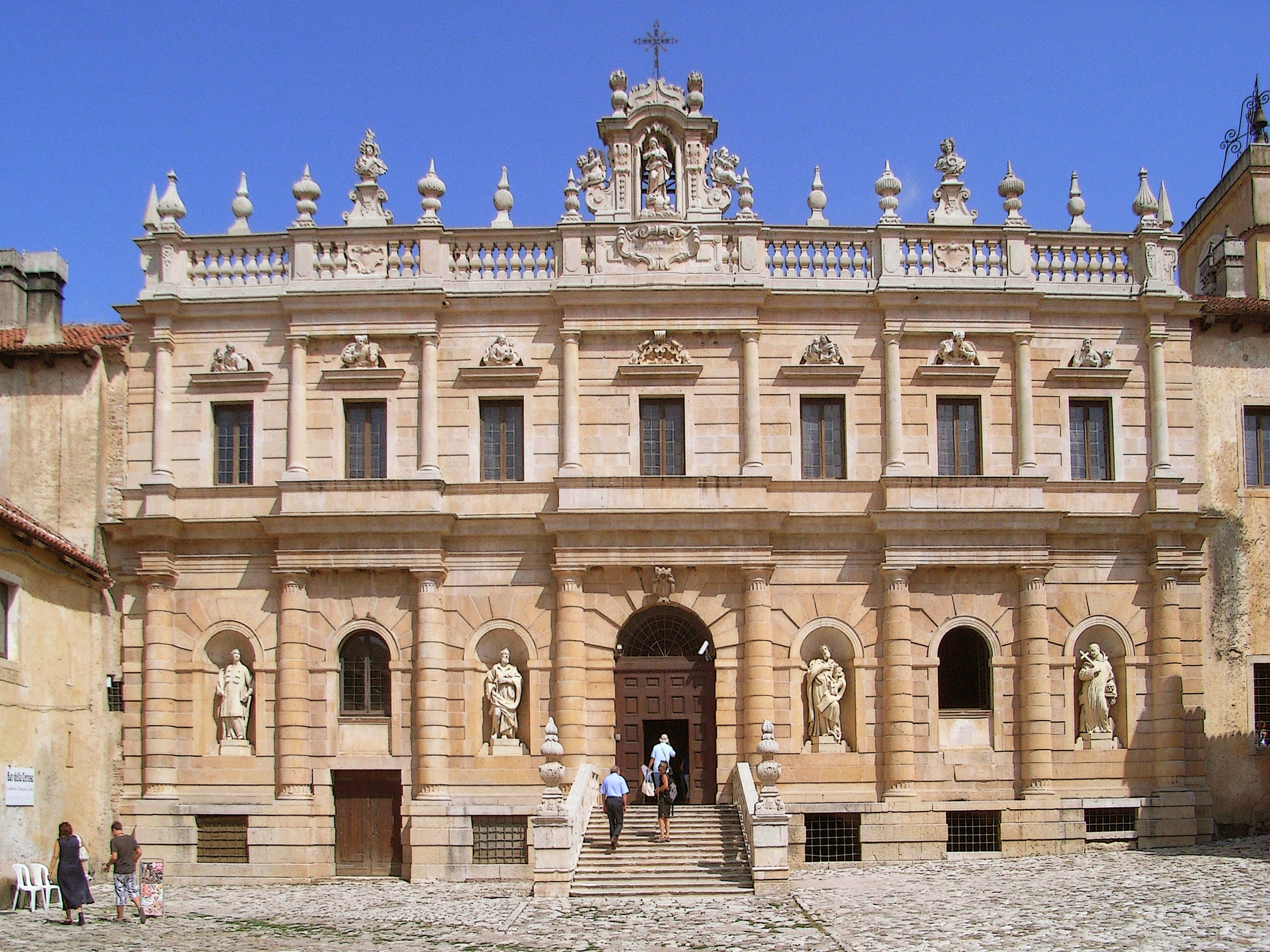
Façade of the monastery

The monastery has the biggest cloister in the world, covering 12,000 m^{2} (2.97 acres) and surrounded by 84 columns. A famous spiral staircase of white marble inside an annex leads to the large library.

According to the strict Carthusian distinction between contemplation and work, there are two distinct places for these practices: on the one hand the peaceful cloisters, the library with its fine Vietri ceramic tiled floor, the chapels decorated with fine inlaid marble works. The altar frontals in most of the chapels are inlaid, not with marble, but with some of the most spectacular 18th. century scagliola work ever created. This is the highest concentration of such work in one place. One of the centres of production was in Naples. the cloister orchards; and on the other hand the large kitchen, the cellars with their enormous wine vats, the laundries, and the huge external yards, where there were people working in the stables, ovens, stores, and at the olive oil mill. The yards were used for productive activities and for trade between the charterhouse and the external world.

The monastery also houses the archaeological museum of Western Lucania, which preserves a collection of all the finds unearthed in the excavations at the necropolis of Sala Consilina and Padula. This museum represents a period of time ranging from protohistory to the Hellenistic Age.

The building has also played a role in the military history of Italy. It served as French headquarters during the Napoleonic Wars, then as a base of Garibaldi's Southern Army during the Risorgimento, finally, as an internment camp for prisoners during the World War 1 and World War 2. It was here that the Czechoslovak Legion in Italy was established in 1917.
