= Tortorella, Campania =

Tortorella
- Comune
- Comune di Tortorella
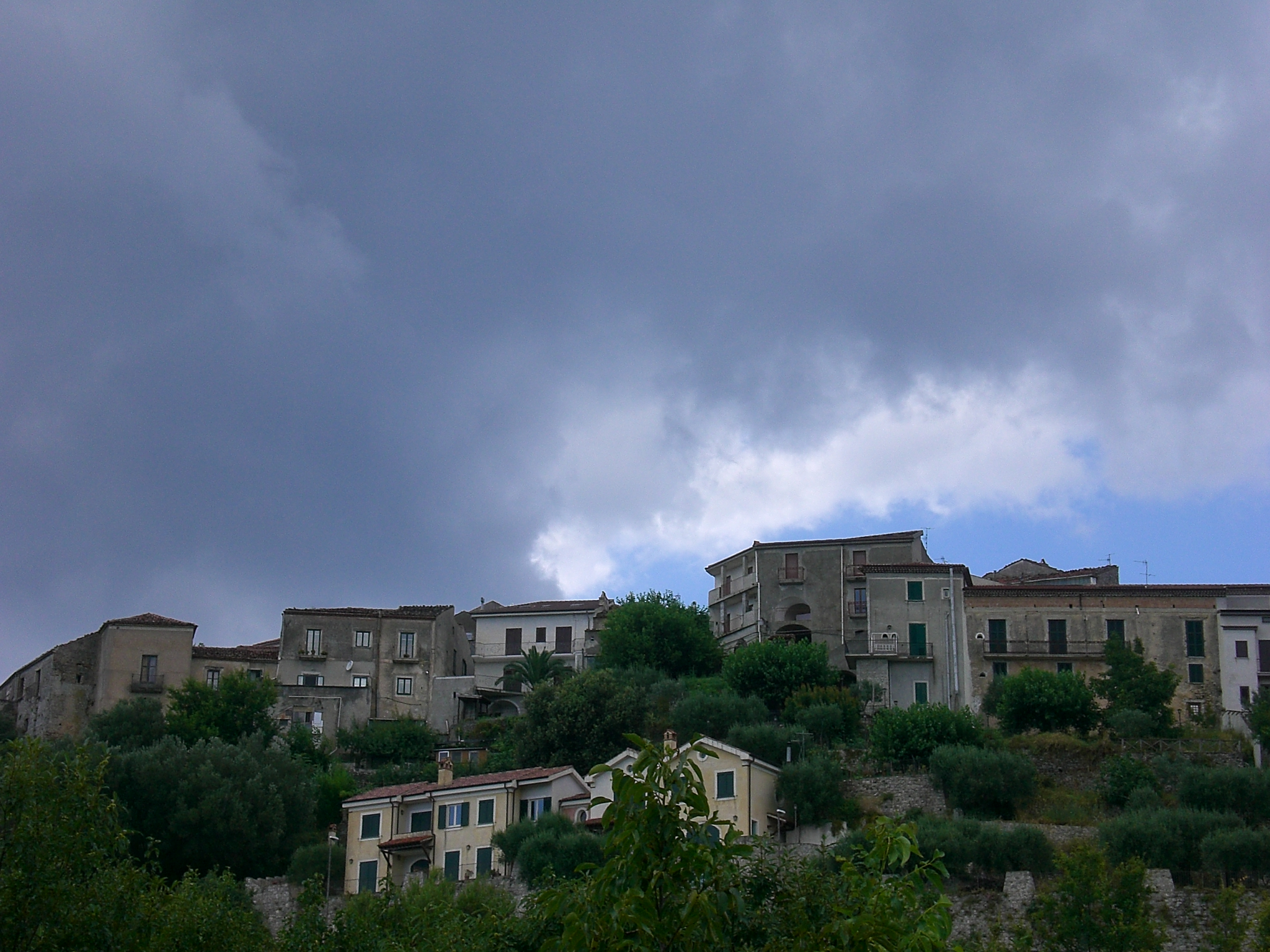

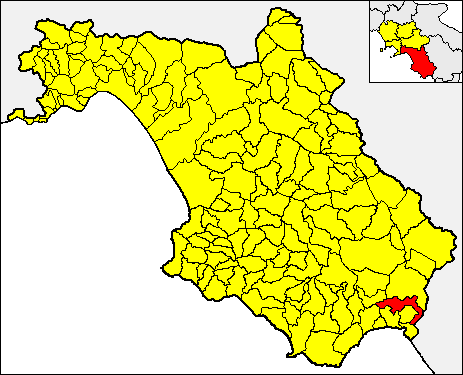
- Tortorella within the Province of Salerno

- Location within Italy Location within Campania
- Coordinates: 40°8′33.61″N 15°36′23.47″E
- Country: Italy
- Region: Campania
- Province: Province of Salerno (SA)
- Frazioni: Caselle

Government
  - Mayor: Luigi Sampogna

Area
  - Total: 34.22 km^{2} (13.21 sq mi)
- Elevation: 582 m (1,909 ft)

Population (28 February 2017)
  - Total: 517
  - Density: 15.1/km^{2} (39.1/sq mi)
- Demonym: Tortorellesi
- Time zone: UTC+1 (CET)
  - Summer (DST): UTC+2 (CEST)
- Postal code: 84030
- Dialing code: 0973
- Patron saint: Saint Vitus
- Saint day: 15 June
- Website: Official website

Tortorella is a town and comune of the province of Salerno, Campania, in south-western Italy.

== Geography ==
Located in southern Cilento, 11 km from the Cilentan Coast, Tortorella is a hill town located in the middle of a large forest area part of Cilento and Vallo di Diano National Park.

The bordering municipalities are Casaletto Spartano, Morigerati, Santa Marina, Sapri, Torraca, Vibonati and Rivello, the last in the regione of Basilicata. The only hamlet (frazione) is the village of Caselle.

== See also ==
- Cilentan dialect
