= Padula =

Italian town in the province of Salerno

- Comune
- Comune di Padula
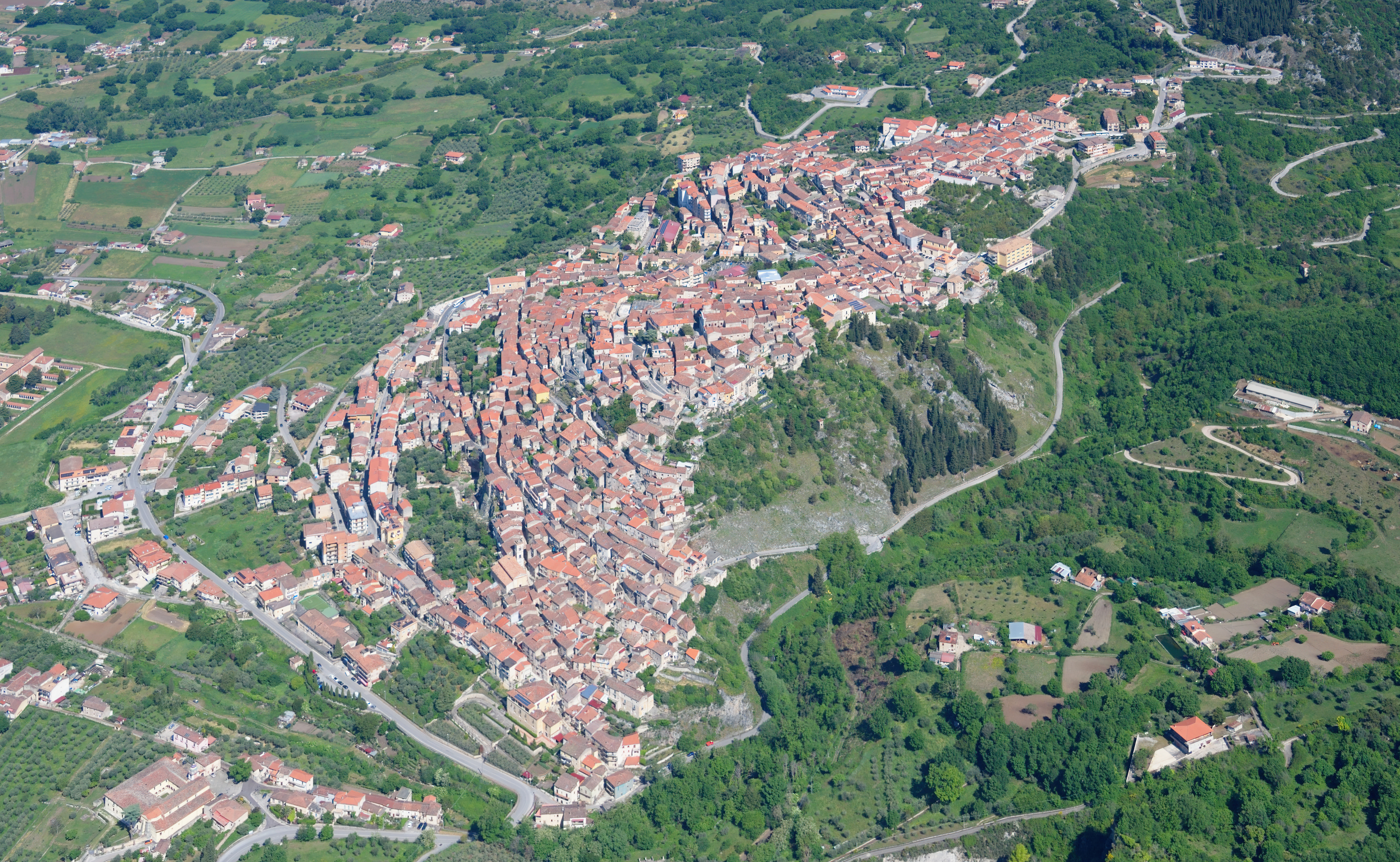
- Aerial view of Padula

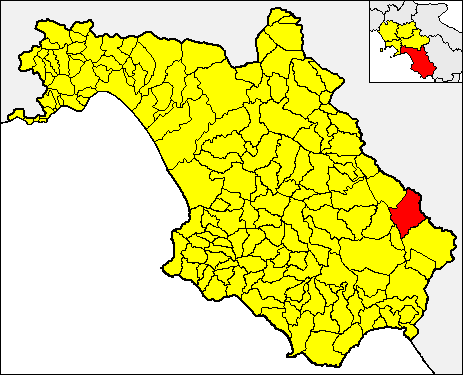
- Padula within the Province of Salerno

- Location within Italy Location within Campania
- Coordinates: 40°20′24″N 15°39′24″E
- Country: Italy
- Region: Campania
- Province: Salerno (SA)
- Frazioni: Ascolese, Caiazzano

Area
  - Total: 66.44 km^{2} (25.65 sq mi)
- Elevation: 699 m (2,293 ft)

Population (2007)
  - Total: 5,279
  - Density: 79.46/km^{2} (205.8/sq mi)
- Demonym: Padulesi
- Time zone: UTC+1 (CET)
  - Summer (DST): UTC+2 (CEST)
- Postal code: 84034, 84030
- Dialing code: 0975
- Patron saint: Saint Michael the Archangel
- Website: Official website

Padula (Cilentan: A Parula) is a town and comune in the province of Salerno, located in the Campania region of south-western Italy. The town is best known for the Carthusian monastery of Certosa di San Lorenzo, it is one of the largest monasteries in Italy and a notable example of Baroque architecture. The Certosa is included in the UNESCO World Heritage Site. As of 2011, Padula had a population of 5,279.

== Geography ==
It is located about 100 kilometres south-east of the provincial capital of Salerno. The majority of the town is on a hillside that reaches 698 meters above sea level. The comune covers an area of 66.33 square kilometres.

== History ==
Its existence reaches back to at least the ninth century when local people used the hilltop area for defence against the Saracens. The history of Padula as an organized village begins with the arrival in 1296 of Tommaso II Sanseverino, though the Monastery of Saint Nicola had been erected on this site earlier, in 1086.

== Religious monuments and churches ==
- Padula Charterhouse
- Church of Annunziata
- Church of St. Michael
- Church of St. Nicholas of Domnis
- Convent of St. Francesco of Assisi
- Convent of St. Augustine
- Church of St. Clement
- Hermitage of St. Michael to Grottelle

== Famous residents ==
- Giuseppe Petrosino, Mafia-busting policeman
- Frank Valente, nuclear scientist
- Andrea Cariello, sculptor

== Transport ==
The town counts a railway station on the abandoned Sicignano-Lagonegro line, closed in 1987. It is served by the A2 motorway Salerno-Reggio Calabria, at the exit "Padula-Buonabitacolo", which is the northern end of a highway to Policastro Bussentino on the Cilentan Coast. Nearest airports are Salerno-Pontecagnano (97 km far) and Naples-Capodichino (168 km).

== Festivals and events ==
- Omelette of 1,000 eggs - "Frittata delle mille uova" (10 August). Reenactment of the celebration where the Carthusian Monks created a 1,000-egg omelette for Charles V's visit to the Certosa. Special giant iron cooking "pan" erected in 1996 expressly for this purpose.
- Festival of the Romito Madonna (first Sunday in May)
- Feast of the Patron Saint Michael the Archangel (last Sunday in May)
- Festival of Saint Michael of the Grottelle (third Sunday in June)
- A week-long August festival of traditional dishes – Bistecca
- Feast of Saint Francis (first and second Sundays of October)

== See also ==
- Certosa di Padula
- Vallo di Diano
