= Caselle in Pittari =

- Comune
- Comune di Caselle in Pittari
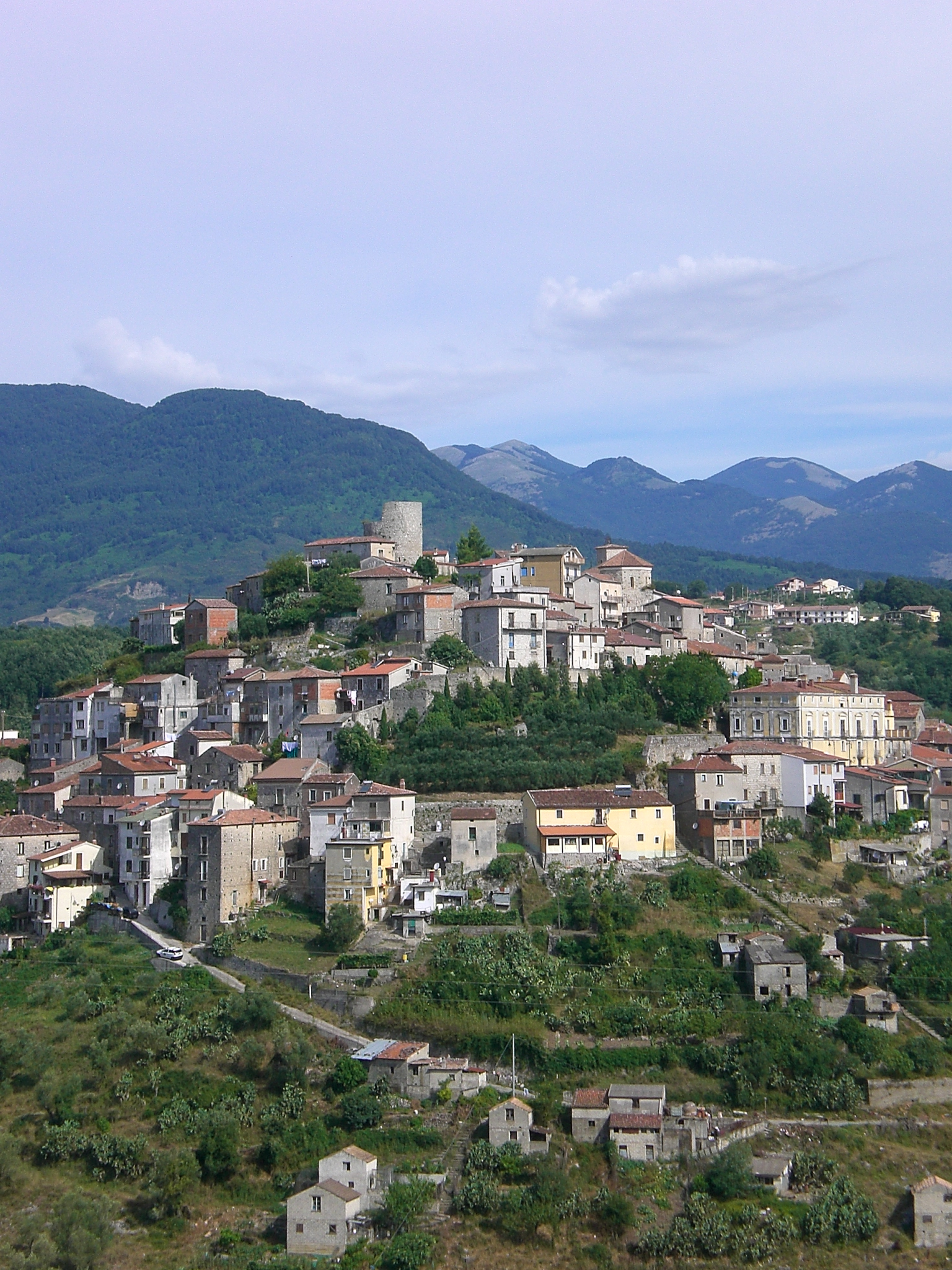

- Location within Italy Location within Campania
- Coordinates: 40°10′N 15°33′E
- Country: Italy
- Region: Campania
- Province: Salerno (SA)
- Frazioni: Botimare, Caporra, Marmore, Santi Caselle, Tempe

Government
  - Mayor: Maurizio Tancredi

Area
  - Total: 45.56 km^{2} (17.59 sq mi)

Population (28 February 2017)
  - Total: 1,947
  - Density: 42.73/km^{2} (110.7/sq mi)
- Demonym: Casellesi
- Time zone: UTC+1 (CET)
  - Summer (DST): UTC+2 (CEST)
- Postal code: 84030
- Dialing code: 0974
- ISTAT code: 065029
- Patron saint: St. Michael Archangel
- Saint day: 8 May
- Website: Official website

Caselle in Pittari is a town and comune in the province of Salerno in the Campania region of south-western Italy.
